= Women at the Hague =

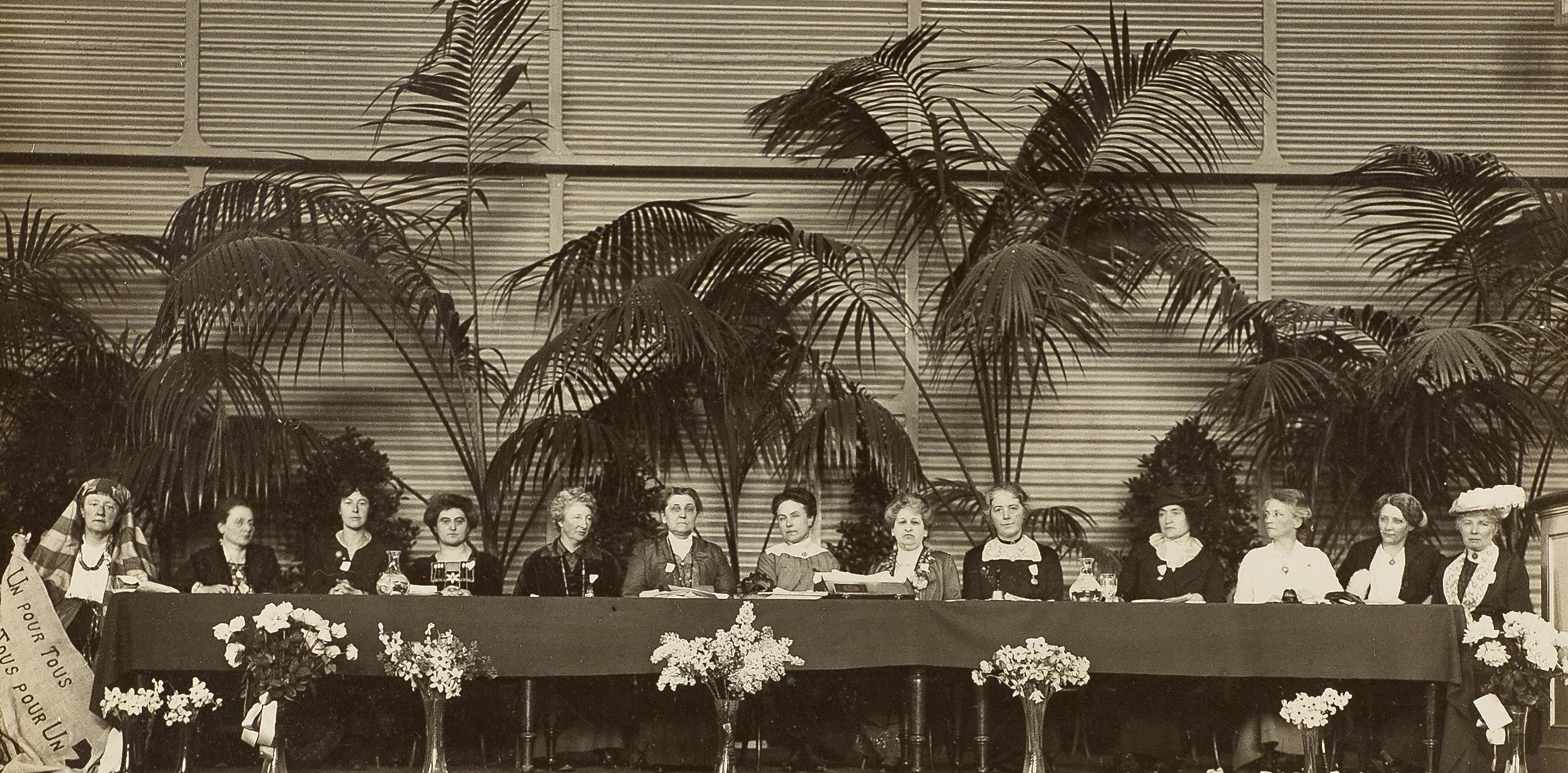
International Congress of Women in 1915. left to right:1. Lucy Thoumaian – Armenia, 2. Leopoldine Kulka – Austria 3. Laura Hughes – Canada, 4. Rosika Schwimmer – Hungary, 5. Anika Augspurg – Germany, 6. Jane Addams – United States, 7. Eugénie Hamer – Belgium, 8. Aletta Jacobs – Netherlands, 9. Chrystal Macmillan – UK, 10. Rosa Genoni – Italy, 11. Anna Kleman – Sweden, 12. Thora Daugaard – Denmark, 13. Louise Keilhau – Norway

Women at the Hague was an International Congress of Women conference held at The Hague, Netherlands in April 1915. It had over 1,100 delegates and it established an International Committee of Women for Permanent Peace (ICWPP) with Jane Addams as president. It led to the creation of the Women's International League for Peace and Freedom (WILPF).

== Background ==
The June 1915 International Woman Suffrage Alliance Congress was scheduled to meet in Berlin. When World War I broke out, the Deutscher Verband für Frauenstimmrecht (German Union for Woman Suffrage) withdrew as host. A notice was published in the December 1914 issue of Jus Suffragii announcing the cancellation. A response to the notice, published in the same issue and written by the Dutch pacifist, feminist, and suffragist Aletta Jacobs, proposed that the conference be held in the Netherlands, as it was a neutral country. Recognizing that the IWSA could not sponsor a conference to discuss foreign policy and the war during the conflict, Chrystal Macmillan privately communicated to Jacobs, suggesting that individuals and organizations could be invited to an unsponsored convention. Many IWSA members, including German leaders Anita Augspurg and Lida Gustava Heymann, echoed the need for a conference and stressed that it should be autonomous so as not to damage the women's movement objectives.

== Preparations ==
In that regard, Jacobs invited representatives of both sides of the conflict and neutral women to a planning meeting held at Amsterdam early in February 1915. The goal of the congress was to protest the war then raging in Europe, and to suggest ways to prevent war in the future. Those present included from Belgium – Flor Burton, Mme. and Mlle. Mulle, and Mme. Van Praag; from Britain – in addition to Macmillan, Kathleen Courtney, Emily Leaf, Catherine Marshall, and Theodora Wilson Wilson; from Germany – Augspurg, Heymann, Frida Perlen, and Mme. Von Schlumberger; and twenty-six activists from the Netherlands. (Note: The complete list of Dutch planners per MacMillan included: W. Asser-Thorbecke, E. Baelde, Hanna van Biema-Hymans, Dr. Mia Boissevain, J. Broese Van Groenou-Holle, Wibbina Clifford Kocq Van Breughel-Roelofs, Geertruida Docters van Leeuwen-van Maarseveen, J. Goudsmit-Goudsmit, Henriëtte Heineken-Daum, S. Hoevenaar, Mien van Itallie-Van Embden, Aletta H. Jacobs, Clasina A. de Jong van Beek en Donk-Kluyver, Gertrude Kapteyn-Muysken, Cornelia Kehrer-Stuart, Jeanne Caroline van Lanschot Hubrecht, Nelly Mansfeldt-De Witt Huberts, Rosa Manus, C. Meyer, Clara Mulder van de Graaf-de Bruyn, Suzanna van Rees-Broese van Groenou, Mietje Rutgers-Hoitsema, Anna Maria den Tex-Boissevain, Thiska Thiel-Wehrbein, Cornelia Mathilde Werker-Beaujon, Sophie Wichers, Mien van Wulfften Palthe-Broese van Groenou.) A preliminary programme was drafted at this meeting, and it was agreed to request the Dutch women to form a committee to take in hand all the arrangements for the Congress and to issue the invitations. The expenses of the Congress were guaranteed by British, Dutch and German women present who all agreed to raise one third of the sum required.

Invitations to take part in the Congress were sent to women's organisations and mixed organisations as well as to individual women all over the world. Each organisation was invited to appoint two delegates. Only women could become members of the Congress and they were required to express themselves in general agreement with the resolutions on the preliminary programme. This general agreement was interpreted to imply the conviction (a) That international disputes should be settled by pacific means; (b) That the parliamentary franchise should be extended to women.

== The Congress ==
The Congress opened on April 28 and was attended by 1,136 participants from both neutral and belligerent nations. The Congress was carried on under two important rules: 1) That discussions on the relative national responsibility for or conduct of the present war and 2) Resolutions dealing with the rules under which war shall in future be carried on, shall be outside the scope of the Congress. The focus was to remain on establishing peace immediately when the conflict ended and developing lasting peacekeeping measures.

The Congress adopted much of the platform of the Woman's Peace Party (WPP), which had passed at a January convention held in Washington, D.C. The WPP platform included arms limitations, diplomatic mediation of the war, development of legislation and economic policies to prevent war, and creation of an international policing force instead of national militaries. Among resolutions passed by the attendees were affirmation of the need for peace and for no territorial transfers to be granted in a peace settlement without the consent of the population affected. Other resolutions called for creation of an international permanent council to peacefully mediate differences between nations, involvement of women in the peace processes, and women's suffrage. Participants at the conference established the International Committee of Women for Permanent Peace, subsequently known as the Women's International League for Peace and Freedom (WILPF). with Jane Addams as president.

== Delegations ==
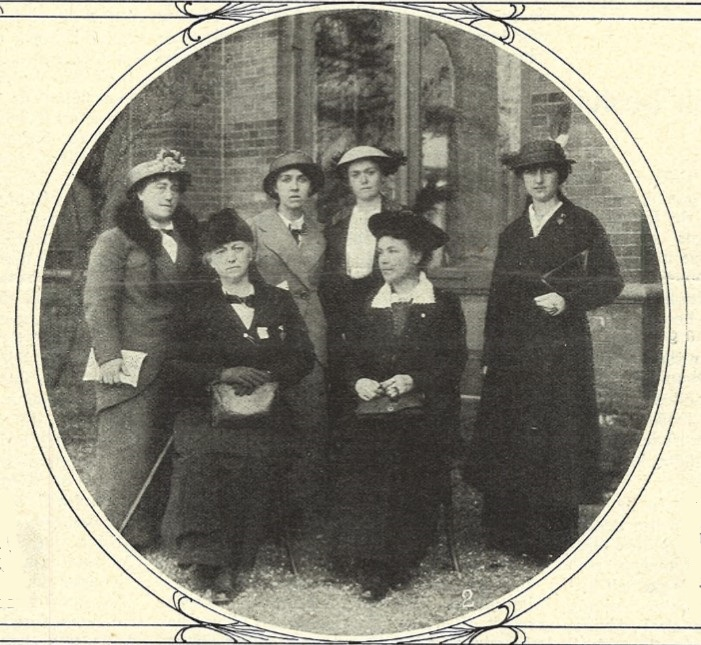
1915 Belgian delegation

There were problems in getting 1200 women together during wartime. The delegation from Britain was trimmed by the Foreign Office to 24 delegates and actually only two (or three) made it to the Hague. Italy only managed one delegate and she was keen to note that she did not represent her country. One woman also came from Canada to represent what was called at the time "the Colonies". Neither France or Russia sent delegations because of the war and the potential that attendance might appear disloyal. The Belgian delegation arrived late because they had to obtain travel documents from the German authorities of Occupied Belgium, undergo frisking at the border crossing at Essen, Belgium, and then walk two hours to Roosendaal, where they caught a train to The Hague. To reinforce the spirit of cooperation, all five of the Belgian delegates were invited by Augspurg to sit on the rostrum. Only Eugénie Hamer agreed, with the caveat that she be allowed to address the congress, which was granted.

Countries represented included the United States, which sent 47 members; Sweden, 12; Norway, 12; Netherlands, 1,000; Italy, 1; Hungary, 9; Germany, 28; Denmark, 6; Canada, 2; Belgium, 5; Austria, 6, and Great Britain, 3, although 180 others from there were prevented from sailing owing to the closing of the North Sea for military reasons. The Congress, which was attended by a large number of visitors as well as by the members, was extremely successful. Proceedings were conducted with the greatest goodwill throughout, and the accompanying resolutions were passed at the business sessions.

== Initial International Committee of Women for Permanent Peace members ==
- Austria: Leopoldine Kulka, Olga Misar
- Armenia: Lucy Thoumaian
- Belgium: Eugénie Hamer, Marguerite Sarton
- Denmark: Thora Daugaard, Clara Tybjerg
- Germany: Anita Augspurg, Lida Gustava Heymann (secretary and interpreter)
- Great Britain and Ireland: Chrystal Macmillan (secretary), Kathleen Courtney (interpreter)
- Hungary: Vilma Glücklich, Rosika Schwimmer
- Italy: Rosa Genoni
- Netherlands: Aletta Jacobs, Hanna van Biema-Hymans (secretary), Mia Boissevain
- Norway: Emily Arnesen, Louise Keilhau
- Sweden: Anna Kleman, Emma Hansson
- United States: Jane Addams (president), Fannie Fern Andrews, Alice Hamilton

== See also ==
- List of women pacifists and peace activists
