= Eugénie Hamer =

Belgian writer and activist (1865–1951)

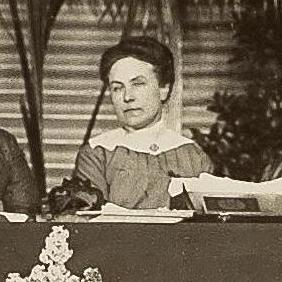
- Hamer in 1915
- Born: 15 November 1865; Leuven, Belgium
- Died: 28 April 1951 (aged 85); Antwerp, Belgium
- Occupations: Journalist; writer; activist; pacifist

Eugénie Hamer (15 November 1865 – April 1951) was a Belgian journalist, writer and activist. Her father and brother served in the Belgian military, but she was a committed pacifist. Involved in literary and women's social reform activities, she became one of the founders of the Alliance Belge pour la Paix par l'Éducation (Belgian Alliance for Peace through Education) in 1906. The organization was founded in the belief that education, political neutrality, and women's suffrage were necessary components to peace. She was a participant in the 18th Universal Peace Congress held in Stockholm in 1910, the First National Peace Congress of Belgium held in 1913, and the Hague Conference of the International Congress of Women held in the Netherlands in 1915. This led to the creation of the International Committee of Women for Permanent Peace, subsequently known as the Women's International League for Peace and Freedom (WILPF). Hamer co-founded the Belgian chapter of the WILPF that same year. During World War I, she volunteered as a nurse and raised funds to acquire medical supplies and create an ambulance service.

Hamer published in various journals and magazines, writing on diverse topics including art, literature, music, the economy, education, history, and politics. As a journalist, she collaborated with several newspapers, including La Métropole (The City), L'Écho du Soir (The Evening Echo), and L'Avenir du Luxembourg (The Future of Luxembourg). As an internationalist, she later joined organizations with fostered friendship and cooperation between nations. Since her own pacifist leanings had been tested during the Occupation of Belgium, she often wrote about both domestic and international politics. She also published two books. Hamer was awarded the Victory and Commemoration Medal, the Civic Cross (1st class), and the Plaque of Honor by the Red Cross. Poland honored her as a knight of the Order of Polonia Restituta and Estonia bestowed upon her the level of knight of the Order of the White Star.

== Early life and education ==
Eugénie Hamer was born on 15 November 1865 in Leuven, Belgium, to Eugénie (née Louvain) and Jean-Michel Hamer. Her father was a military officer who died when she was young. Her mother raised Eugénie and her brother Georges (born 1872), stressing the importance of a good education. Little is known of her early life, but the family moved to Antwerp and Hamer participated in literary circles and women's social reform activities.

== Activism ==
Hamer was involved with the Cercle des Dames de la Croix Rouge (Women's Circle of the Red Cross), serving as its general secretary. She co-founded, in 1906, the Alliance Belge pour la Paix par l'Éducation (Belgian Alliance for Peace through Education). The purpose of the organization was to promote pacifist and diplomatic resolution to controversy through educational initiatives presented to school children and the community. Baroness Florence de Laveleye (née Wheeler) served as the inaugural president of the alliance and Hamer was appointed as assistant secretary. In 1910, she and Laveleye were the Belgian delegates for the organization at the 18th Universal Peace Congress in Stockholm. She became the organization's general secretary in 1911 and vice president by 1915. Although the organization was officially apolitical, the Alliance Belge pour la Paix par l'Éducation was part of the feminist social reform movement, maintaining that education and women's suffrage were important tools to prevent war. Political neutrality and representation for women were so important to Hamer that she turned down a request in 1911 to join a federation proposed by Henri La Fontaine, a politician, pacifist, and later Nobel Peace Prize winner, to unite Belgian pacifist actions into a single organization. She informed La Fontaine that her organization would lose important ties to other feminist organizations like the Conseil National des Femmes Belges (National Council of Belgian Women) and the Vrouwehvereeniging der Antwerpen (Women's Association of Antwerp), which gave her association access to international journals, publishing, and fundraising networks. She presented a report on pacifism at the First National Peace Congress of Belgium in 1913, stressing the importance of education as a means to achieve peace and international cooperation. That year, seeing the troubled international environment, Hamer changed her mind and after the conference, aligned the Alliance Belge pour la Paix par l'Éducation with the Fédération des Sociétés belges de la Paix (Federation of Belgian Peace Societies).

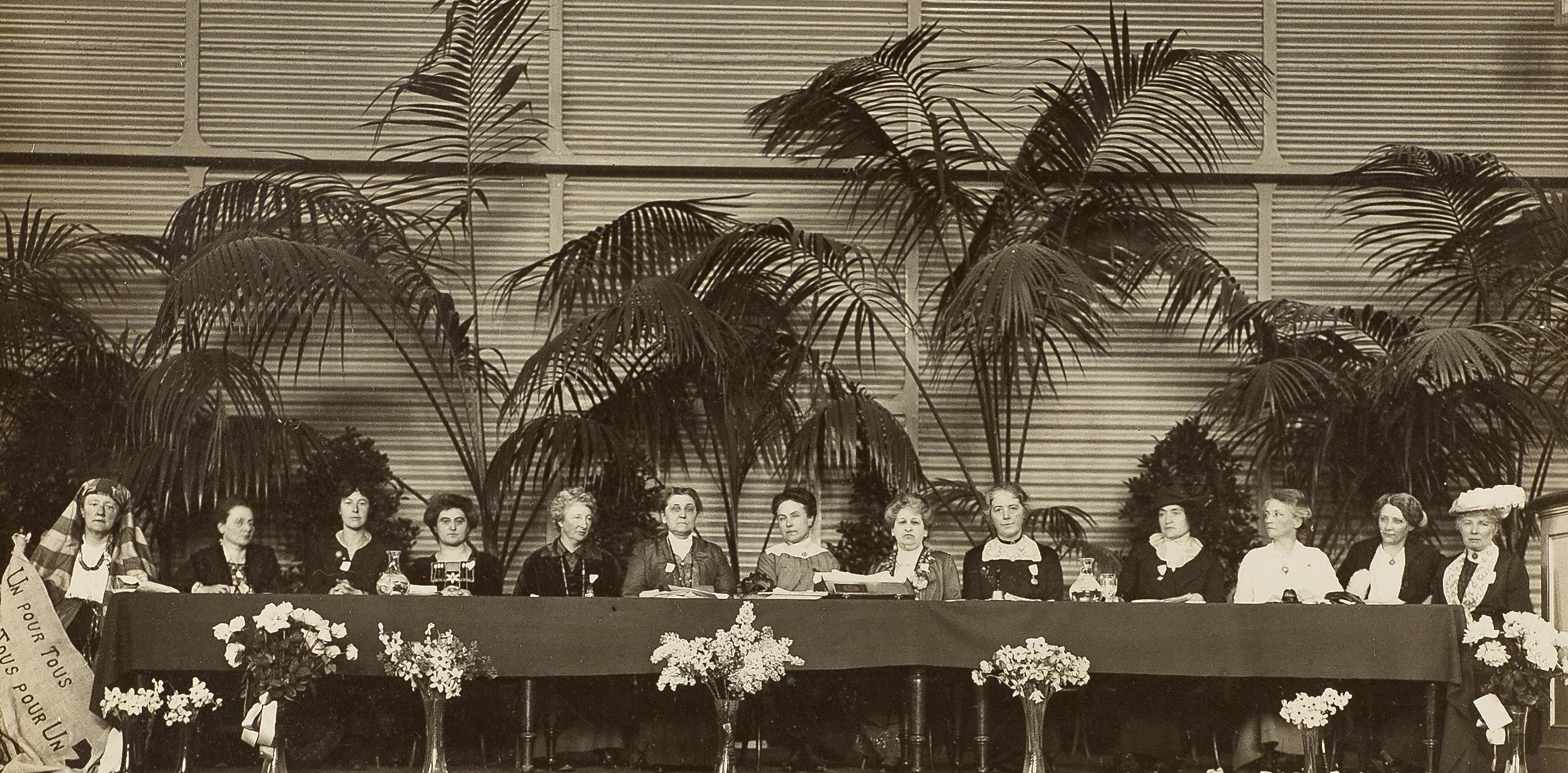
International Congress of Women in 1915. left to right:1. Lucy Thoumaian – Armenia, 2. Leopoldine Kulka, 3. Laura Hughes – Canada, 4. Rosika Schwimmer – Hungary, 5. Anika Augspurg – Germany, 6. Jane Addams – USA, 7. Eugénie Hamer – Belgium, 8. Aletta Jacobs – Netherlands, 9. Chrystal Macmillan – UK, 10. Rosa Genoni – Italy, 11. Anna Kleman – Sweden, 12. Thora Daugaard – Denmark, 13. Louise Keilhau – Norway

During World War I, Hamer served as a nurse and organized fundraisers to establish an ambulance service and adequate supplies to care for the wounded. Her brother Georges served with distinction in the war and was wounded several times. She nursed him back to health. Hamer was known for her pacifism, but struggled with her patriotic feelings, advocating that peace could not occur until Belgium was liberated. Despite the fact that Belgian feminists such as Jane Brigode refused to attend meetings of the International Woman Suffrage Alliance during the war which included Germans, in 1915, she attended the Hague Conference, as a delegate for the Alliance Belge pour la Paix par l'Éducation. The conference came about because the International Women Suffrage Alliance congress to be held in Berlin had been cancelled, so a committee of Dutch women, led by Aletta Jacobs, proposed that the Netherlands, as a neutral country, could host a meeting to allow women to maintain their solidarity. Hamer, and the alliance's treasurer, Marguerite Sarton, were persuaded to attend, because they did not want resolutions passed without the conference hearing from Occupied Belgium.

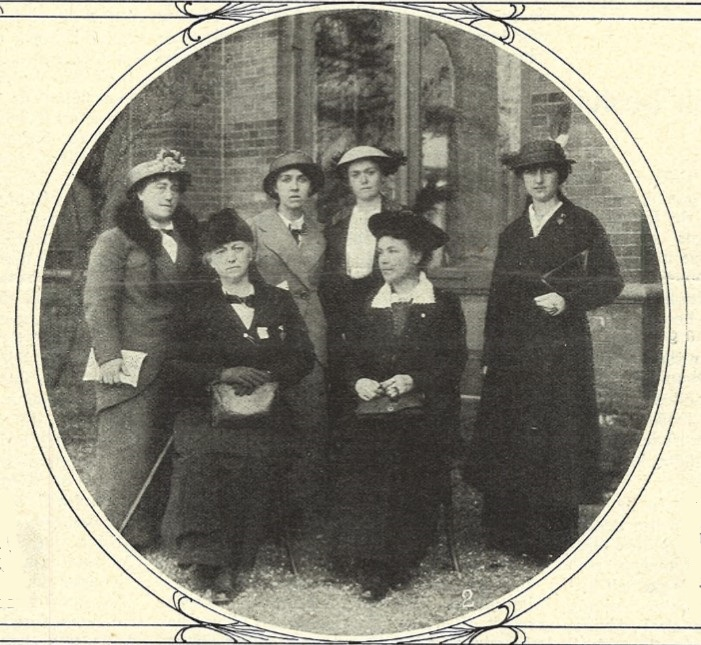
Belgian delegation to the 1915 Congress of Women in The Hague, Hamer seated on right

Hamer and Sarton, along with three delegates for the Cercle de Dames et Jeunes Filles Sionistes (Circle of Zionist Ladies and Young Women) persuaded the German authorities to grant them travel documents. They drove to Essen, where they were frisked to the skin and then walked two hours to reach Roosendaal in the Netherlands. Catching a train there, Hamer and the four other Belgian attendees arrived after the congress had begun. As a symbol of the importance of cooperation, the German attendees, led by Anita Augspurg, suggested that all of the Belgian delegates be seated on the rostrum. Hamer agreed, on the condition that she was allowed to address the assembly. According to French socialist Jean Longuet, she spoke eloquently on the need for peace to be based on justice. Resolutions passed by the attendees reaffirmed the need for peace and called for no territorial transfers to be granted in a peace settlement without the consent of the population affected. Other resolutions called for creation of an international permanent council to peacefully work out differences between nations, involvement of women in the peace processes, and women's suffrage.

Participants at the conference established the International Committee of Women for Permanent Peace, subsequently known as the Women's International League for Peace and Freedom (WILPF). Initially, Hamer and Sarton were the Belgian members of the international committee and their names appeared on the masthead. They established a Belgian chapter in 1915, but difficulties caused by the German occupation made communications difficult. After the war, Hamer once again became active in pacifist causes. In 1925, she and Marguerite Nyssens, (Note: There is confusion on which Marguerite Nyssens joined Hamer. Scholar Nadine Lubelski-Bernard notes that Sarton (1889–1941), who married Bernard-Emile Nyssens in 1922 and was a cousin of George Sarton, continued to work with Hamer. Historian Éliane Gubin identifies Hamer's partner in revitalizing the alliance as Marguerite Nyssens (1858–1947).) worked to reestablish the Brussels chapter of the Alliance Belge pour la Paix par l'Éducation but without success. Frequently writing about the relationship of Belgium with Poland and Slavic countries, Hamer joined and became secretary of the organization Comité des amities polonaises (Belgian-Polish Friendship Committee). Both she and her brother participated in the ceremonies marking the unveiling in Antwerp in 1929 of the monument erected to honor fallen soldiers. Georges spoke and Hamer placed a wreath in honor of the officers who had died. Hamer also attended, along with other dignitaries, the opening of the Polish pavilion for the Liège Exposition of 1930, as a representative for the committee.

== Career ==
Hamer published in various journals and magazines, writing on diverse topics including art, music, the economy, education, history, and juvenile crime. She also undertook literary studies on Belgian, English, and French writers, as well as literature in Slavic countries before the expansion of the Russian Empire. An article on Belgian lacemaking was published by Home in 1913 and she returned to the topic with "L'Art de nos dentellières" ("The Art of Our Lacemakers") in the journal Touring Club de Belgique in November 1925. From 1919, she published historical analyses in the magazine La Patrie Belge (The Belgian Fatherland). Hamer became an editor at the Catholic newspaper La Métropole (The City) in 1926. She was particularly interested in writing about politics, both domestically and internationally. She published two books, Histoire des littératures slaves (History of Slavic Literature) and Relation de voyage (Account of a Journey) and later collaborated with the journal L'Écho du Soir (The Evening Echo). In the 1930s, she contributed to newspapers and journals including L'Avenir du Luxembourg (The Future of Luxembourg) and Clarté (Clarity).

== Awards and honors ==
Hamer was awarded the Victory and Commemoration Medal and the Plaque of Honor by the Red Cross. In 1921 was honored by a royal decree with the Civic Medal (1st class), for her activities during the war. Poland honored her as a knight of the Order of Polonia Restituta in 1923 and in 1938 Estonia bestowed upon her the level of knight of the Order of the White Star, for her coverage in La Métropole.

== Death and legacy ==
Hamer's obituary appeared on 28 April 1951 in the newspaper Le Soir (The Evening), confirming that she died in Antwerp. At the time of her death, she was remembered for her writing, as well as her pacifism and war service.

== Selected works ==
- Hamer, Eugénie (May 1919). "Restitution d'œuvres d'art à la Belgique" [Return of Works of Art to Belgium]. La Patrie Belge (in French). 1 (27). Brussels, Belgium: Le Soir: 437–439.
- Hamer, Eugénie (July 1919). "L'éducation supérieure de la femme en Belgique" [Higher Education of Women in Belgium]. La Patrie Belge (in French). 1 (34). Brussels, Belgium: Le Soir: 547–550.
- Hamer, Eugénie (November 1919). "La Bataille de L'Yser" [The Battle of the Yser]. La Patrie Belge (in French). 1 (50). Brussels, Belgium: Le Soir: 757–758.
- Hamer, Eugénie (June 1921). "Les Vieux Grognards de Napoléon" [The Old Guard Grenadiers of Napoleon]. La Patrie Belge (in French). 3 (7). Brussels, Belgium: Le Soir: 108–110.
- Hamer, Eugénie (August 1922). "Le château de Claremont" [Claremont Castle]. La Patrie Belge (in French). 4 (8). Brussels, Belgium: Le Soir: 177–179.
- Hamer, Eugénie (November 1925). "Lettre de Pologne: Stefane Zeromski" [Letter from Poland: Stefan Zeromski]. La Renaissance d'Occident (in French). XVI (1). Brussels, Belgium: M. Gauchez: 362–365. OCLC 18928981.
- Hamer, Eugénie (25 December 1937). "La fête de Noël en Pologne" [Christmas Celebration in Poland]. L'Avenir Du Luxembourg (in French). Arlon, Belgium. p. 5, columns 6–7 – via KBR: Royal Library of Belgium.

== See also ==
- List of peace activists
