= Genoni (surname) =

Genoni is a surname. Notable people with the surname include:

- Leonardo Genoni (born 1987), Swiss ice hockey player
- Rosa Genoni (1867–1954), Italian fashion designer, teacher, feminist and advocate for workers' rights
