= Lars H. Gustafsson =

Swedish writer (born 1942)

Honorary Doctor Lars H. Gustafsson
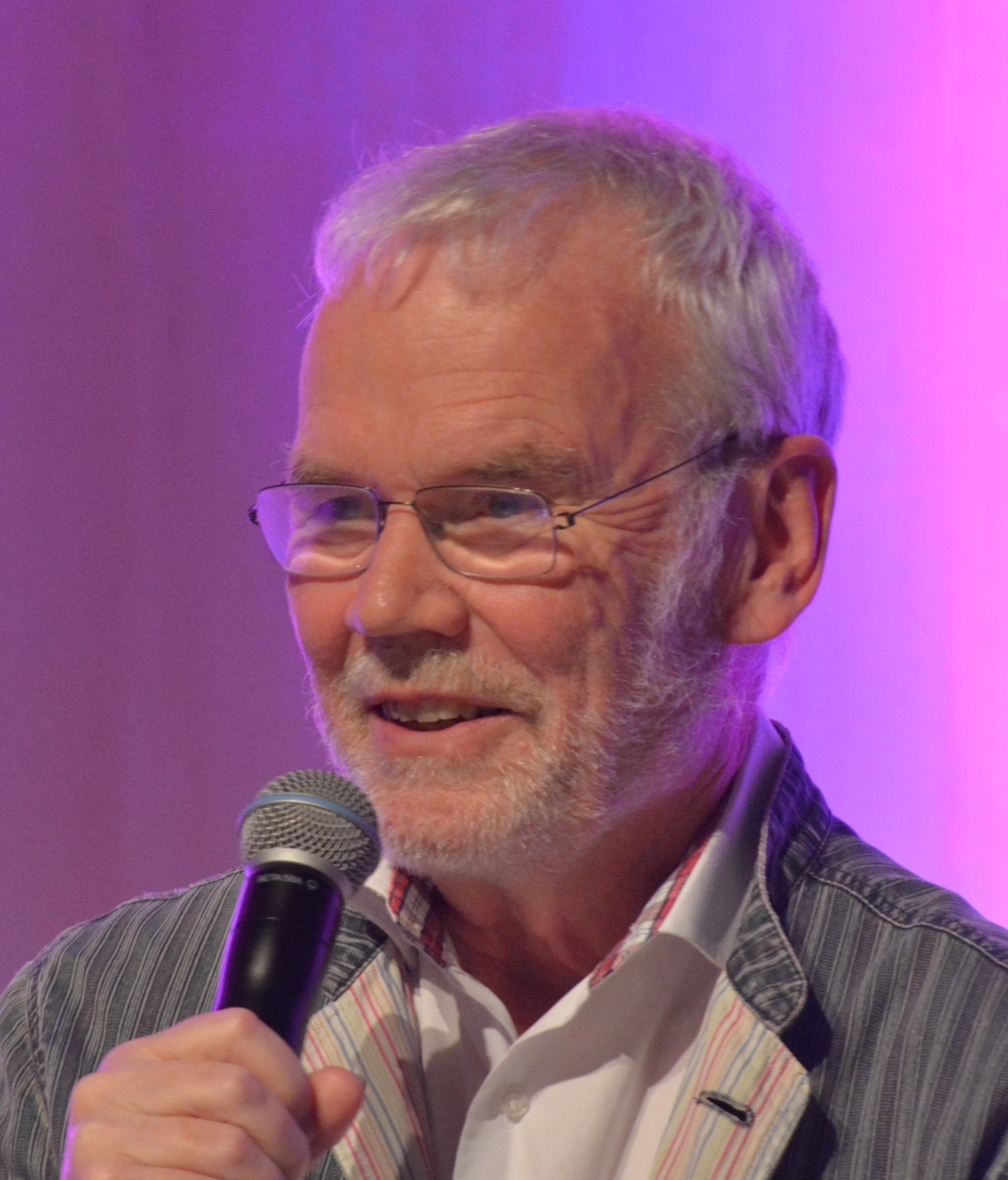
- Lars H Gustafsson at Gothenburg Book Fair 2016.
- Born: May 10, 1942 (age 83); Sweden Uppsala
- Occupations: Pediatrician, author, and social commentator
- Known for: Swedish Save the Children Organization
- Website: Lars H Gustafsson's blog

Lars H. Gustafsson was born on May 10, 1942, in Uppsala, Sweden. His full name is Lars Hugo Elias Lindkvist Gustafsson. He is a pediatrician, author, and social commentator in Sweden.

== Profession ==
Lars H. Gustafsson has spent most of his professional career as a pediatrician, first at the Uppsala University Hospital, and from the early 1980s, in Child Health and school health care. Gustafsson later moved to Lycksele, where he was responsible for the Child Health Care in Lapland South. In 1988, he became the head of the school health department in Örnsköldsvik. Gustafsson moved to Lund in 2004, and worked professionally for three years as a school physician in the district of Rosengard in Malmö.

Gustafsson is a father of eight children, and has published many books and articles on children, including the rights of children and child rearing practicies. On July 27, 1990, he was the guest on the summer program of the Swedish Broadcasting Channel 1. In that program he talked about his personal experience of being a father and doctor.

== Other Activities ==
Gustafsson has a long history of work in the Swedish Save the Children Organization. In 1972, he was elected as a member of the Board and as an acting member from 1982 to 1986. He was also the representative of the Swedish Save the Children in the negotiations of the Convention on the Rights of the Child in Geneva.

At the end of the 1990s, he became the chairman of the Alliance of Home and School Union for a four-year period.

Gustafsson was also a member of the Swedish UNICEF committee and the Swedish Association of School Physicians.

He was also appointed by the government as a member of the Ethics Council after the Estonian disaster. Gustafsson also worked as an expert in government committees on parent support and on school health.

For ten years he was a member of the jury for the Astrid Lindgren Memorial Award, known as the world's largest children's book award.

Gustafsson has also been a member of an expert committee linked to the Children's ombudsman in Sweden.

In 2008, he received his Honorary Doctorate from Malmö University

== Family ==
Lars H. Gustafsson is the son of Professor Yngve Gustafsson, a professor of cultural technology at the Swedish University of Technology and the University of utrecht, and his wife Gertrud, teacher of housing. Lars H. Gustafsson is the older brother of Bengt Gustafsson, who is an astronomer. Lars H. Gustafsson also has a son called Linde Lindkvist who works for human rights and Linde has written the book ”Barnets mänskliga rättigheter.”
