= Raschke =

Raschke is a surname. Notable people with the surname include:

- Baron von Raschke (born 1940), American wrestler
- Benjamin Raschke (born 1982), German politician
- Carl Raschke (born 1944), American philosopher
- Jorge Raschke (born 1930), Puerto Rican Pentecostal pastor
- Kimmey Raschke (born 1974), Puerto Rican politician
- Linda Bradford Raschke (born 1959), American financier
- Maria Raschke (1850–1935), German women's movement lawyer
- Paula J. Raschke-Lind (born 1962), American politician
- Philippe Raschke (born 1967), French football player
- Ulf Raschke (born 1972), German football player
