= Thora Daugaard =

Danish women's rights activist and pacifist

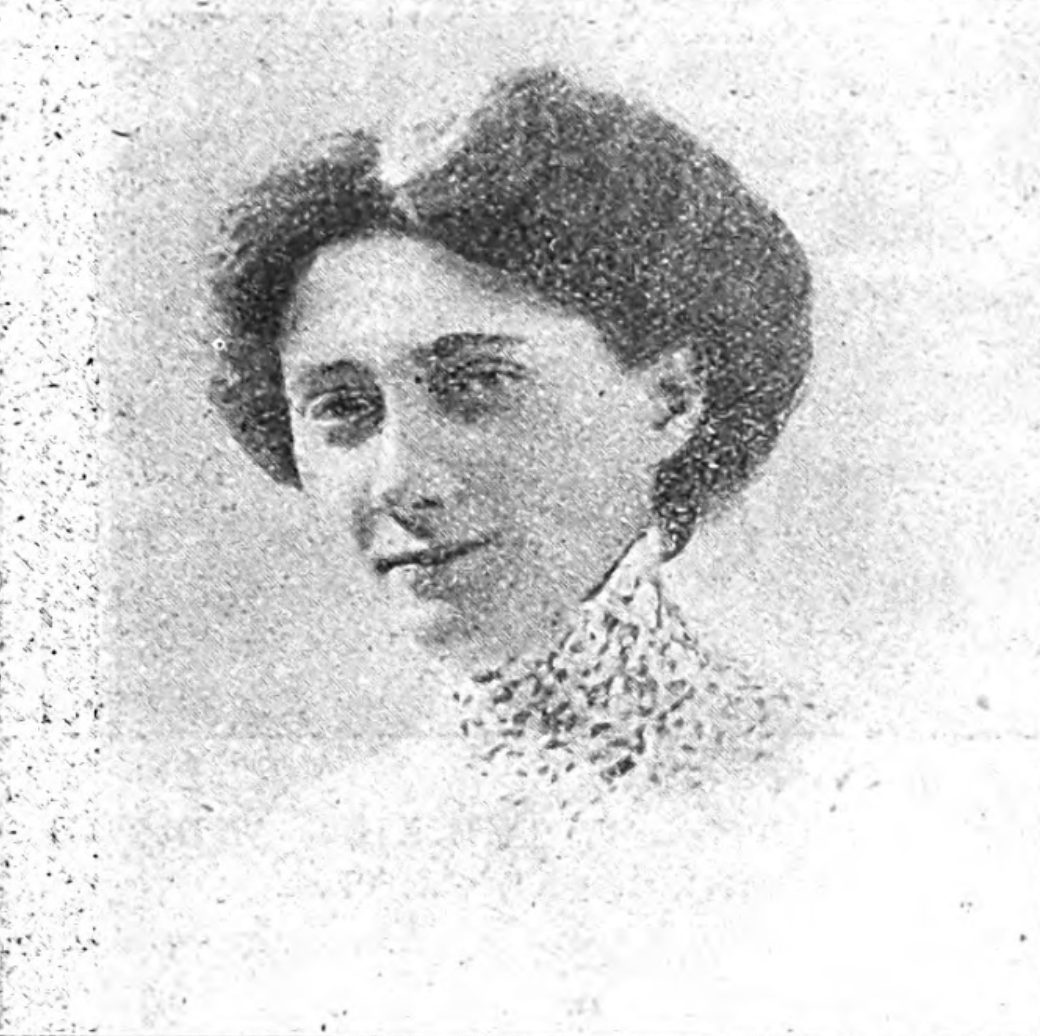
Daugaard in 1915.

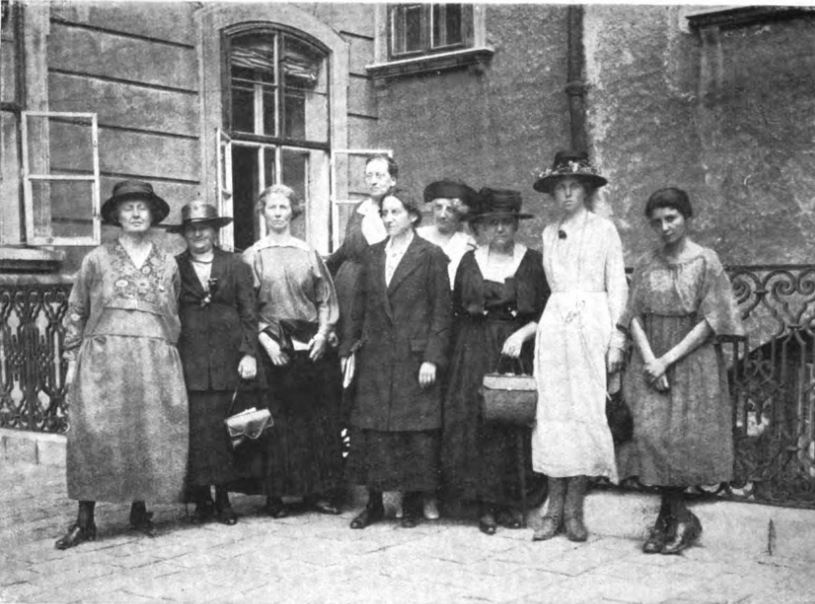
1921 WILPF Executive Committee: Left to right, front: Cornelia Ramondt-Hirschmann, Gabrielle Duchêne, Lida Gustava Heymann, Hertzka, Jane Addams, Catherine Marshall, Gertrud Baer. Back: Emily Greene Balch and Thora Daugaard.

Theodora (Thora) Frederikke Marie Daugaard (22 October 1874 – 28 June 1951) was a Danish women's rights activist, pacifist, editor and translator. In 1915, she attended the International Women's Conference in The Hague, together with Clara Tybjerg. Thereafter she established and later headed the Danske Kvinders Fredskæde or Danish Women's Peace Chain which became the Danish branch of the Women's International League for Peace and Freedom. She is also remembered for organizing assistance for Jews and their children in Nazi-occupied Denmark during the Second World War.

== Biography ==
Born on 22 October 1874 in Store Arden near Hobro, Jutland, Theodora Frederikke Marie Daugaard was the daughter of the hotel keeper Peder Johannes Jensen (1841–1903) and Petrine Daugaard (1848–1925). After receiving an education as a translator in 1903, she was employed by the Danish Women's Society as editorial secretary for their journal Kvinden og Samfundet and as business manager of their new office. Working together with Esther Carstensen, Gyrithe Lemche and Astrid Stampe Feddersen, she joined the organization's electoral committee, becoming its international secretary until 1915 when Danish women won the right to vote.

Thereafter, she devoted her efforts principally to the peace movement, attending the 1915 International Women's Conference in the Hague where she announced: "We want war no longer. We no longer want it explained that we women are protected by war. No, we are raped by war!". The following year, she established the Danish Women's Peace Chain. From 1920 to 1941, she became the association's president, raising membership to 15,000.

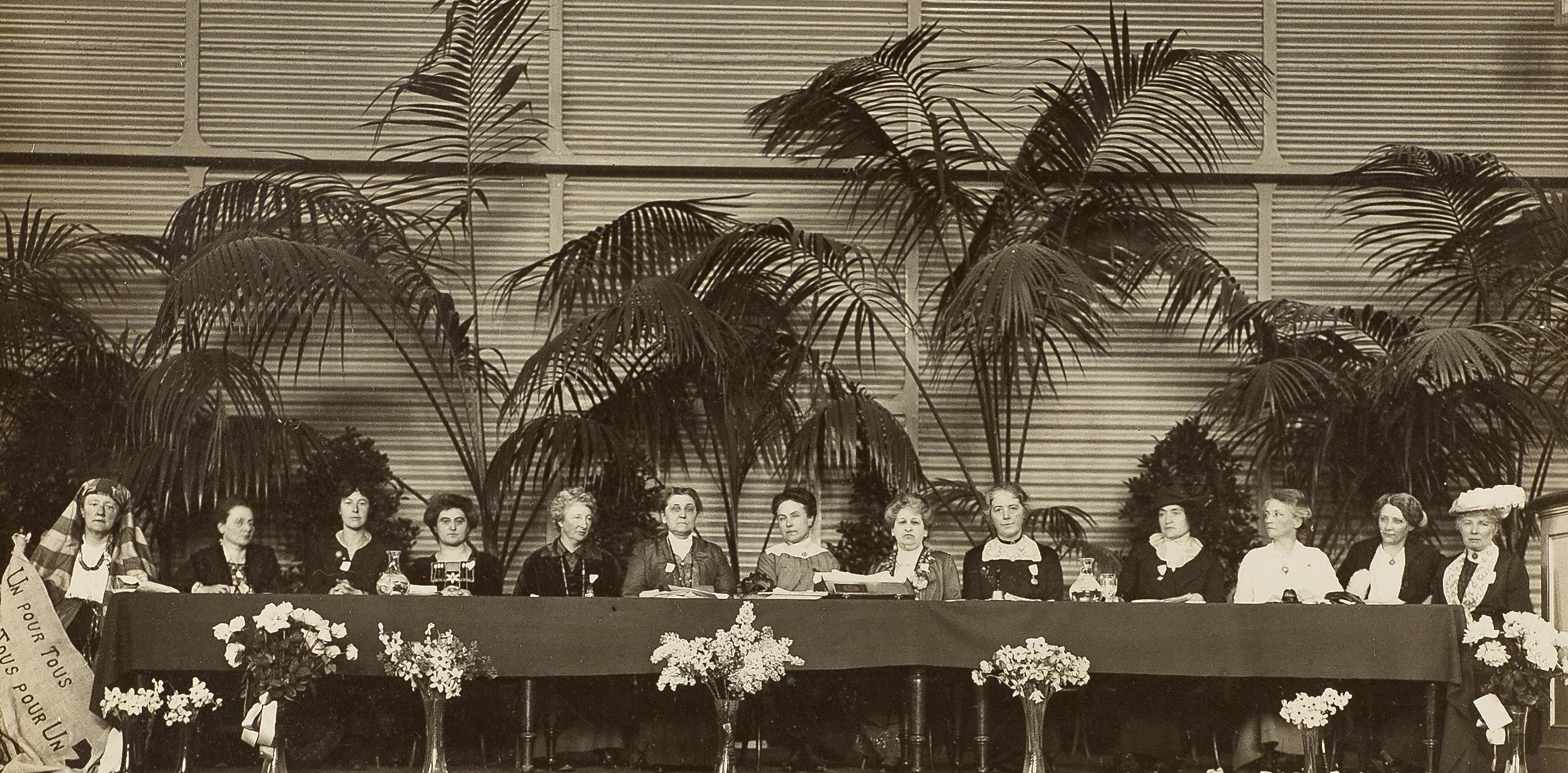
International Congress of Women in 1915. left to right:1. Lucy Thoumaian - Armenia, 2. Leopoldine Kulka, 3. Laura Hughes - Canada, 4. Rosika Schwimmer - Hungary, 5. Anika Augspurg - Germany, 6. Jane Addams - USA, 7. en:Eugenie Hamer, 8. Aletta Jacobs - Netherlands, 9. Chrystal Macmillan - UK, 10. Rosa Genoni - Italy, 11. Anna Kleman - Sweden, 12. Thora Daugaard - Denmark, 13. Louise Keilhau - Norway

In 1918, based on her experiences abroad, she initiated the construction of a home for single, self-employed women with almost 150 apartments, a restaurant and a laundry. When it was completed in 1920 as Clara Raphaels Hus on Copenhagen's Østerbro, Daugaard moved in herself. The following year, she was engaged as editor of a new weekly magazine Tidens Kvinder which until 1923 was published by Danske Kvinders Nationalråd. She also edited the magazine published by Kvindernes Internationale Liga for Fred og Frihed, the new name of Danske Kvinders Fredskæde. From 1930 to 1932, she edited Vore Damer which was similar to Tidens Kvinder.

Invited by the American social worker Jane Addams who was president of the Women's International League for Peace and Freedom, she made a lecture tour of the United States from 1927 to 1929. In 1934, Daugaard represented the WILPF at the League of Nations, becoming the League's international treasurer from 1938 to 1946.

In 1938 to 1939, together with Mélanie Oppenhejm and Kirsten Gloerfelt-Tarp, she was active in saving Jewish children from the Nazi countries, succeeding in having 320 sent to Denmark. During the Nazi occupation of Denmark, most of them were sent to Sweden. Her involvement with the Jews forced her into fleeing to Sweden herself in 1943.

Thora Daugaard died on 28 June 1951 in Holstebro and was buried at Mariager Abbey.

== See also ==
- List of peace activists
