= Anita Augspurg =

German jurist, actress, writer, activist and pacifist

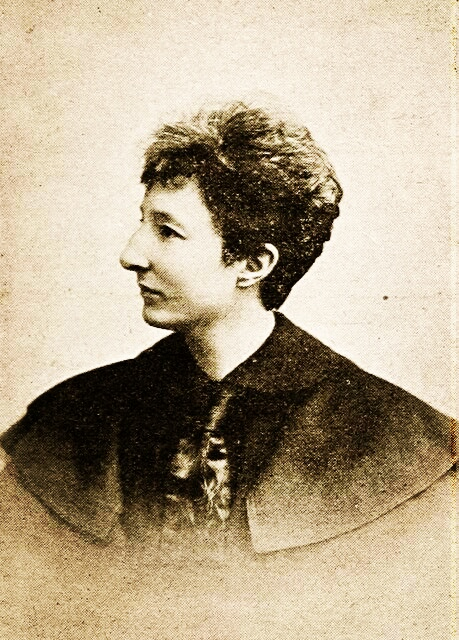
- Augspurg in 1902
- Born: Anita Theodora Johanna Sophie Augspurg; 22 September 1857; Verden an der Aller, Kingdom of Hanover
- Died: 20 December 1943 (aged 86); Zurich, Switzerland
- Occupations: Actress, lawyer, writer
- Partner: Lida Heymann
- Writing career
- Subject: Feminism
- Notable works: "Open Letter", 1905

Anita Theodora Johanna Sophie Augspurg (22 September 1857 – 20 December 1943) was a German jurist, actress, writer, activist of the radical feminist movement and a pacifist.

== Biography ==
Augspurg was born the youngest daughter of the lawyer Wilhelm Augsburg.

She attended a private women's school between 1864 and 1873, then started work in her father's Verden law practice, where she worked until she reached the age of majority. Augspurg passed the Prussian state test for teachers at an Höhere Mädchenschule in 1879 (after taking a private course in Berlin). Soon afterwards she completed a similar test that allowed her to work as a Gymnasium teacher. At the same time, she took acting classes from Minona Frieb-Blumauer.

From 1881-82, she was an apprentice to the Meiningen Ensemble and took part in concert tours across Germany, the Netherlands, and Lithuania. Starting in 1884, she worked as a permanent member at the Landestheater Altenburg (today in Thuringia, Germany) specifically at the Ducal Court Theater. Her maternal grandmother, who died in 1887, left her a considerable inheritance, which made her financially independent.

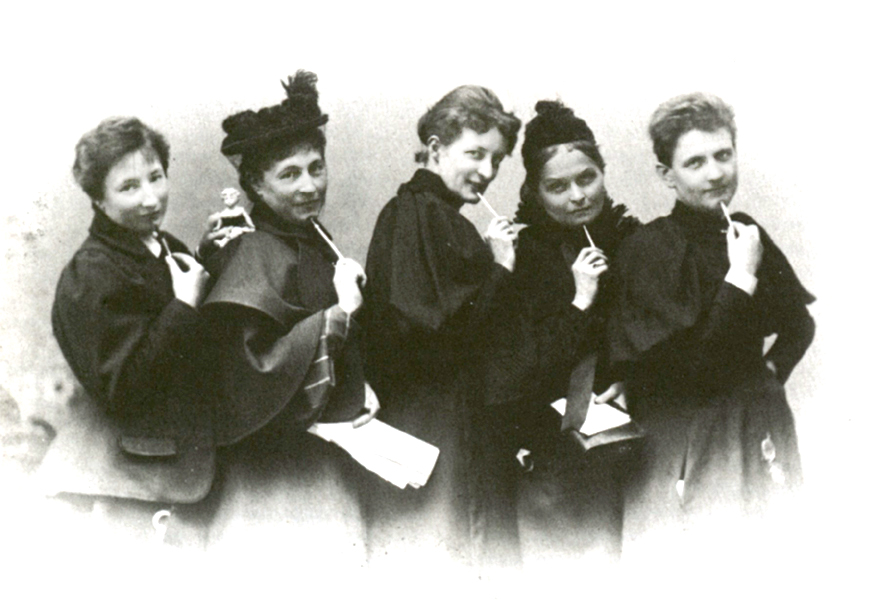
Augspurg and her feminist associates "Verein für Frauenstimmrecht": Anita Augspurg, Marie Stritt, Lily von Gizycki, Minna Cauer and friend Sophia Goudstikker, photographed at the Elvira Studio, Munich in 1896

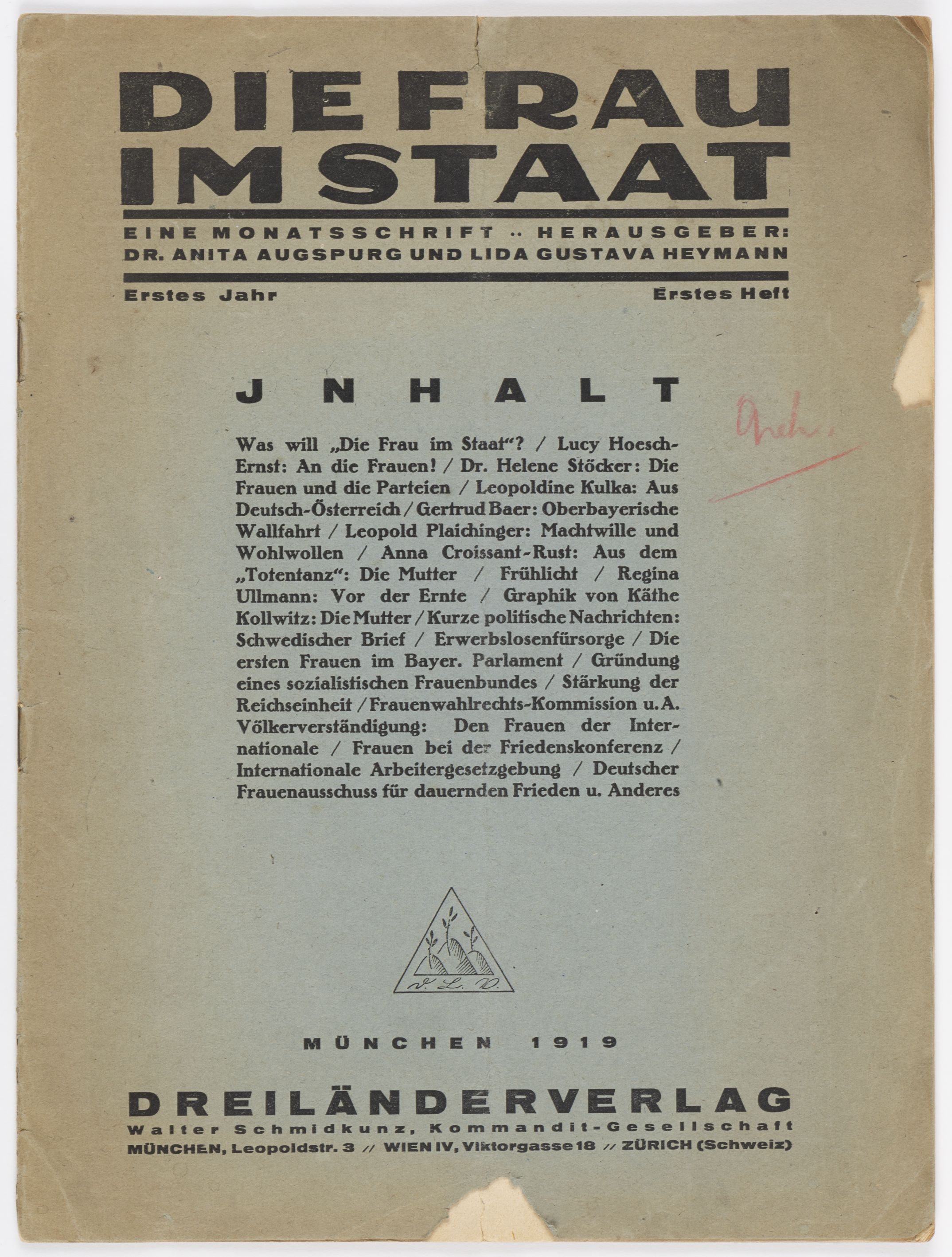
"The woman and the state" a monthly magazine released by Dr. Anita Augsprung

After a five-year career as an actress, she went with her friend Sophia Goudstikker to Munich, where in 1887 they jointly opened a photography studio, the Hofatelier Elvira. The two women wore short hair, unconventional clothing, and frequently made public their support for the struggle for the liberation of women and their free lifestyle. Because of that unusual lifestyle, Augspurg was exposed to personal attacks by anti-feminists far more than were other personalities of the women's movement. Nonetheless, her contacts made through the stage and the studio quickly made her well-known, and she eventually had the Bavarian royal family as a customer.

By 1890, Augspurg was deeply involved in the German women's movement and practised as a public speaker. Her commitment to women's rights led her to decide, after several years of successful work, to study for a law degree. She went to the University of Zurich, Switzerland, because women in Germany still did not have equal access to universities. Alongside Rosa Luxemburg, with whom she had a turbulent relationship, she was one of the founders of the International Female Students Association (Internationaler Studentinnenverein). She completed her studies with a doctorate in 1897, the first doctor of law of the German Empire.

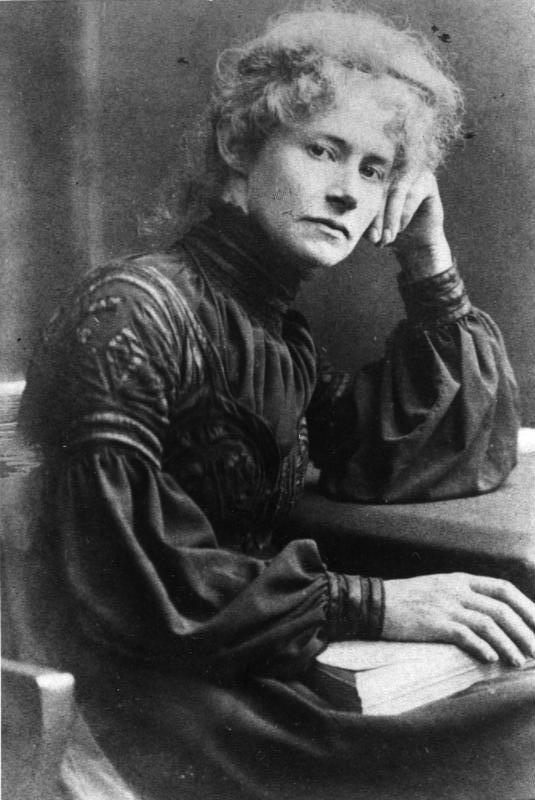
Lida Gustava Heymann

Meanwhile, in 1895 Augspurg had begun to collaborate with the newspaper Die Frauenbewegung ("The Women's Movement"), writing articles denouncing the discrimination to which she was subjected in social legislation, describing in particular marriage as a form of legalised prostitution. In 1896, she participated in the International Conference of Women held in Berlin, where she met the radical feminist Lida Gustava Heymann, who later became her significant other and partner.

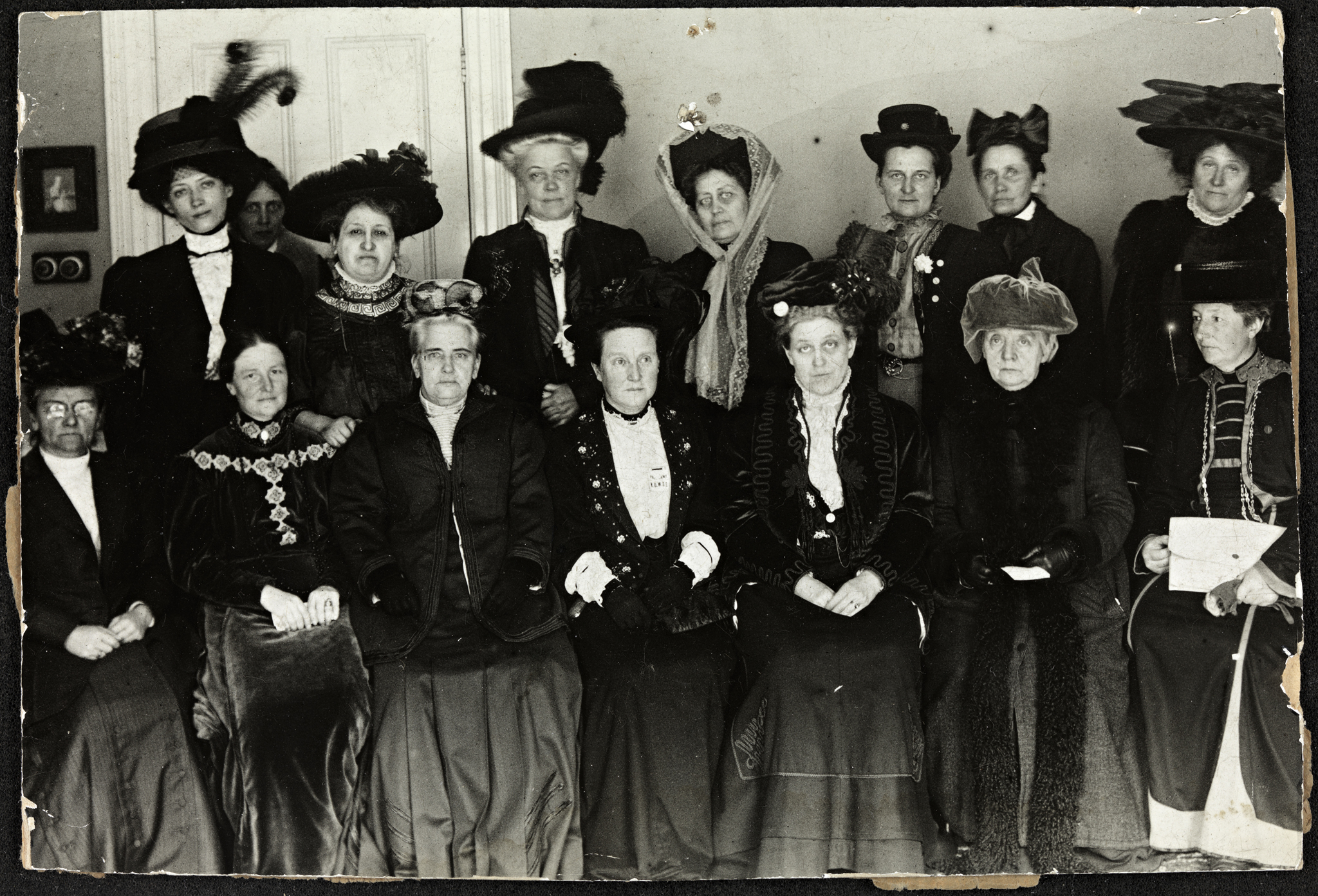
Suffrage Alliance Congress with Millicent Fawcett presiding, London 1909. Top row from left: Thora Dangaard (Denmark), Louise Qvam (Norway), Aletta Jacobs (Netherlands), Annie Furuhjelm (Finland), Madame Mirowitch (Russia), Käthe Schirmacher (Germany), Madame Honneger, unidentified. Bottom left: Unidentified, Anna Bugge (Sweden), Anna Howard Shaw (USA), Millicent Fawcett (Presiding, England), Carrie Chapman Catt (USA), F. M. Qvam (Norway), Anita Augspurg (Germany).

At the turn of the century, Augspurg campaigned for women's rights in the German Civil Code: she brought together her political friends, Minna Cauer and Marie Raschke, producing petitions on the new marriage and family law, which was only partially effective. Augspurg published a sensational "Open Letter" in 1905, in which she appealed for change to the then prevailing patriarchal marriage law to enable entry into "free marriage", in defiance of state-approved marriage. This was interpreted as a call to boycott marriage and brought a storm of indignation.

During this time, following the radical split from the conservative women's organisations, many women considered radical women's suffrage as a priority. Augspurg and her partner Lida Gustava Heymann worked together on the board of the Association of Progressive Women's Organizations. They formed an association for women's suffrage in Hamburg (1902) and in Bavaria (1913). From 1907 Augspurg contributed to Zeitschrift für Frauenstimmrecht, and was represented in 1919 in the magazine Die Frau im Staat, in which feminist, radical democratic and pacifist positions were published.

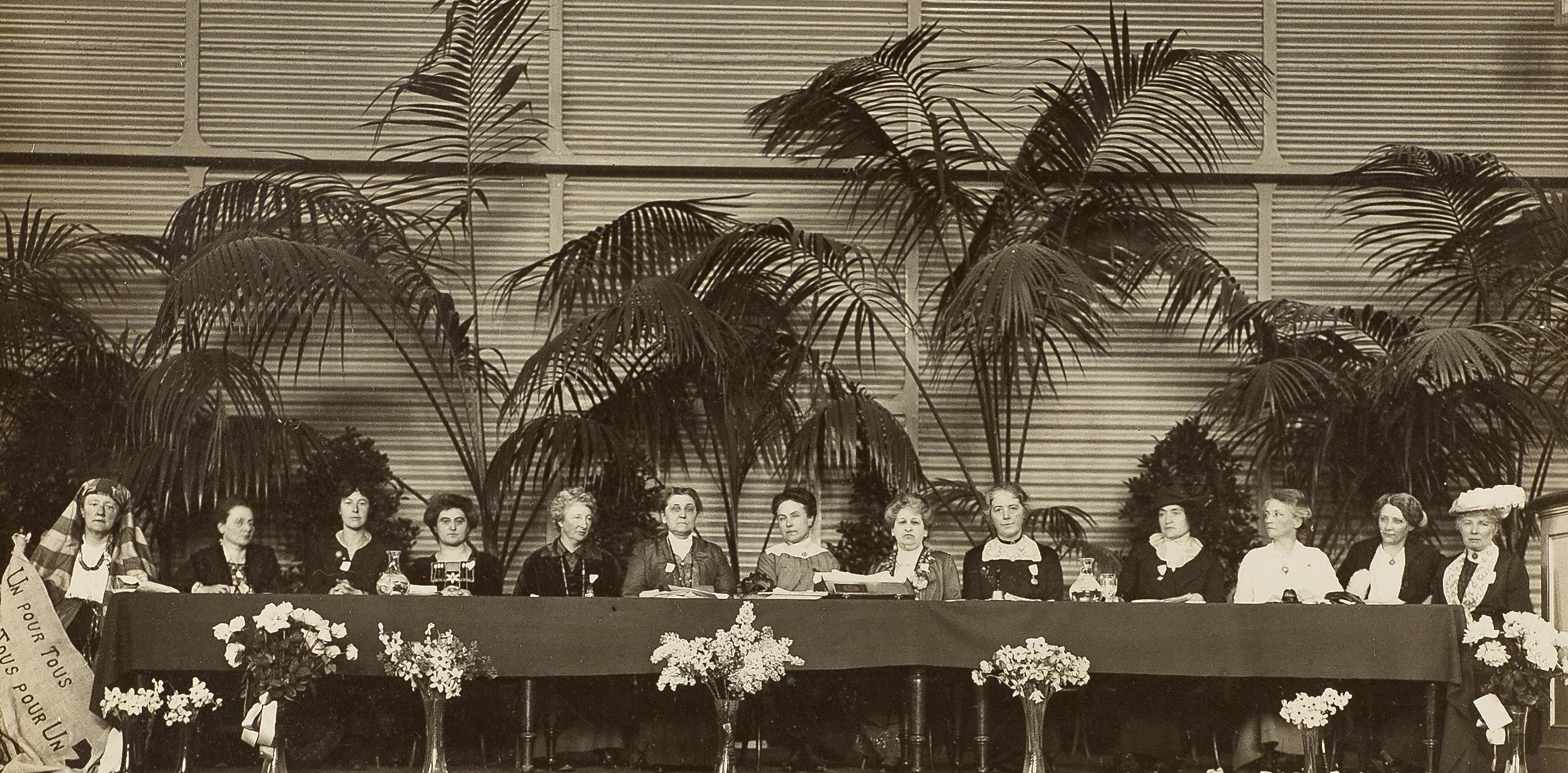
International Congress of Women in 1915. left to right: 1. Lucy Thoumaian - Armenia, 2. Leopoldine Kulka, 3. Laura Hughes - Canada, 4. Rosika Schwimmer - Hungary, 5. Anita Augspurg - Germany, 6. Jane Addams - USA, 7. Eugenie Hanner, 8. Aletta Jacobs - Netherlands, 9. Chrystal Macmillan - UK, 10. Rosa Genoni - Italy, 11. Anna Kleman - Sweden, 12. Thora Daugaard - Denmark, 13. Louise Keilhau - Norway

During the First World War Augspurg and Heymann held illegal gatherings in their Munich apartment. They participated in the International Congress of Women in The Hague, Netherlands, in April 1915, which led to the founding in 1919 of the Women's International League for Peace and Freedom (IFFF), of which Heymann was vice president. They found a common anti-war ground with the Independent Social Democrats, which had split off from the Social Democratic Party. In this context, their former differences with Socialist women such as Clara Zetkin became less important. Augspurg collaborated with Kurt Eisner, and after the proclamation of the Weimar Republic in 1918, became a member of the provisional Landtag of Bavaria. In the following elections, they soon ran on the list of Independent Social Democrats but gained no mandate.

Until 1922, a JD did not enable women to practise law in Germany, but new equality legislation under the Weimar Constitution finally allowed Augspurg to practise. Since other women had obtained a JD before her, especially in Zürich, Freiburg, Munich, or Leipzig (Johanna von Evreinov), references to her as Germany's first woman lawyer are erroneous.

Opposed to war, she proposed forms of active boycotts. In addition to supporting the policy of ending capitalism and organising a matriarchy as a future society, she continued to fight against all forms of discrimination by gender and nationality, for general disarmament, and for the independence of all nations oppressed by colonialism. She was opposed to antisemitism and the nascent Nazism. Heymann and Anita Augspurg were two major leaders of the German women's movement, during the first 30 years of the 20th century, who combined their feminism with pacifism, insisting that the nations of Europe would be spared future wars only when women had the right to vote.

In 1933, due to the takeover of the Nazi Party, Augspurg and Heymann did not return to Germany from a winter trip; they feared reprisals. A crucial factor was that she and Heymann had in 1923 appealed to the Bavarian Interior Minister for the expulsion of the Austrian Adolf Hitler, on grounds of sedition. The Nazis in power did indeed confiscate their property, and all written material in their home was lost. She went to live in exile in Switzerland, together with Heymann. They went into deeper exile in South America, but later returned to Europe to settle in Zürich. There, Augspurg died in 1943, a few months after her partner. She and Heymann are buried in the Fluntern Cemetery in Zürich.

== Publications ==
- Lida Gustava Heymann, Anita Augspurg, Erlebtes, Erschautes. Deutsche Frauen kämpfen für Freiheit, Recht und Frieden, Hellmann, Frankfurt/M. 1992 ISBN 3-927164-43-7
- Ueber die Entstehung und Praxis der Volksvertretung in England. Knorr & Hirth, München 1898, zugleich: Dissertation, Zürich 1898

== See also ==
- Lily Braun
- First women lawyers around the world
- Lida Gustava Heymann
- List of peace activists
- Marianne Weber

== General and cited references ==
- Ute Gerhard, "Anita Augspurg (1857–1943): Juristin, Feministin, Pazifistin", in «Streitbaren Juristen», ed. Thomas Blancke, Baden Baden, Nomos Verlagsgeselschaft 1990
- Christiane Berneike: Die Frauenfrage ist Rechtsfrage. Die Juristinnen der deutschen Frauenbewegung und das Bürgerliche Gesetzbuch, Nomos VG, Baden-Baden 1995, pp. 44–66 ISBN 3-7890-3808-3
- Arne Duncker: Gleichheit und Ungleichheit in der Ehe. Persönliche Stellung von Frau und Mann im Recht der ehelichen Lebensgemeinschaft 1700–1914, Böhlau, Köln 2003 ISBN 3-412-17302-9
- Christiane Henke: Anita Augspurg, Rowohlt, Reinbek 2000 ISBN 3-499-50423-5
- Susanne Kinnebrock: Anita Augspurg (1857–1943). Feministin und Pazifistin zwischen Journalismus und Politik. Eine kommunikationshistorische Biographie, Centaurus, Herbolzheim 2005
- Neiseke, Eric (8 March 2006). "Über die "Öffentlichkeitsarbeiterin" Anita Augspurg". Querelles-net (in German) (18). doi:10.14766/400. ISSN 1862-054X.
- Sonja Mosick: Anita Augspurg – Idealistin oder Realistin? Eine Analyse ihrer publizistischen Tätigkeit unter besonderer Berücksichtigung ihrer Sicht auf die Frauenfrage Universität Diplomarbeit, Hildesheim 1999
- Hiltrud Schroeder: "Übermächtig war das Gefühl, daß wir vereint sein müssen". Anita Ausgspurg (1857–1943) und Lida Gustava Heymann (1868–1943)". In: Luise F. Pusch und Joey Horsley (eds.): Berühmte Frauenpaare. Suhrkamp, Frankfurt/Main 2005, pp. 96–136.
