= Lucy Thoumaian =

Armenian women's rights and peace activist

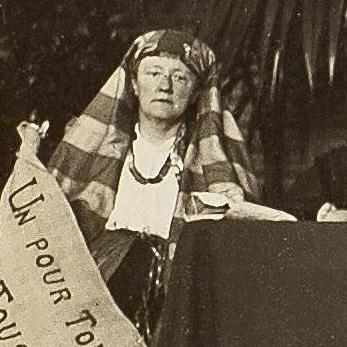
- Thoumaian in 1915
- Born: Rossier de Visme; 1890; Switzerland
- Died: 1940 (aged 49–50); United States of America
- Known for: Pacifism, women's rights
- Spouse: Rev. Prof. Thoumaian

Lucy Thoumaian or Rossier de Visme (Armenian: Լյուսի Թումայան; 1890–1940) was an Armenian woman's rights and peace activist. Driven out of Armenia she helped create a school in Chigwell for orphaned Armenians. She published a manifesto for peace before she attended the Women at the Hague conference in 1915. Afterwards, she began working for the League of Nations.

== Life ==
Thoumaian was born in Switzerland with the name Rossier de Visme.

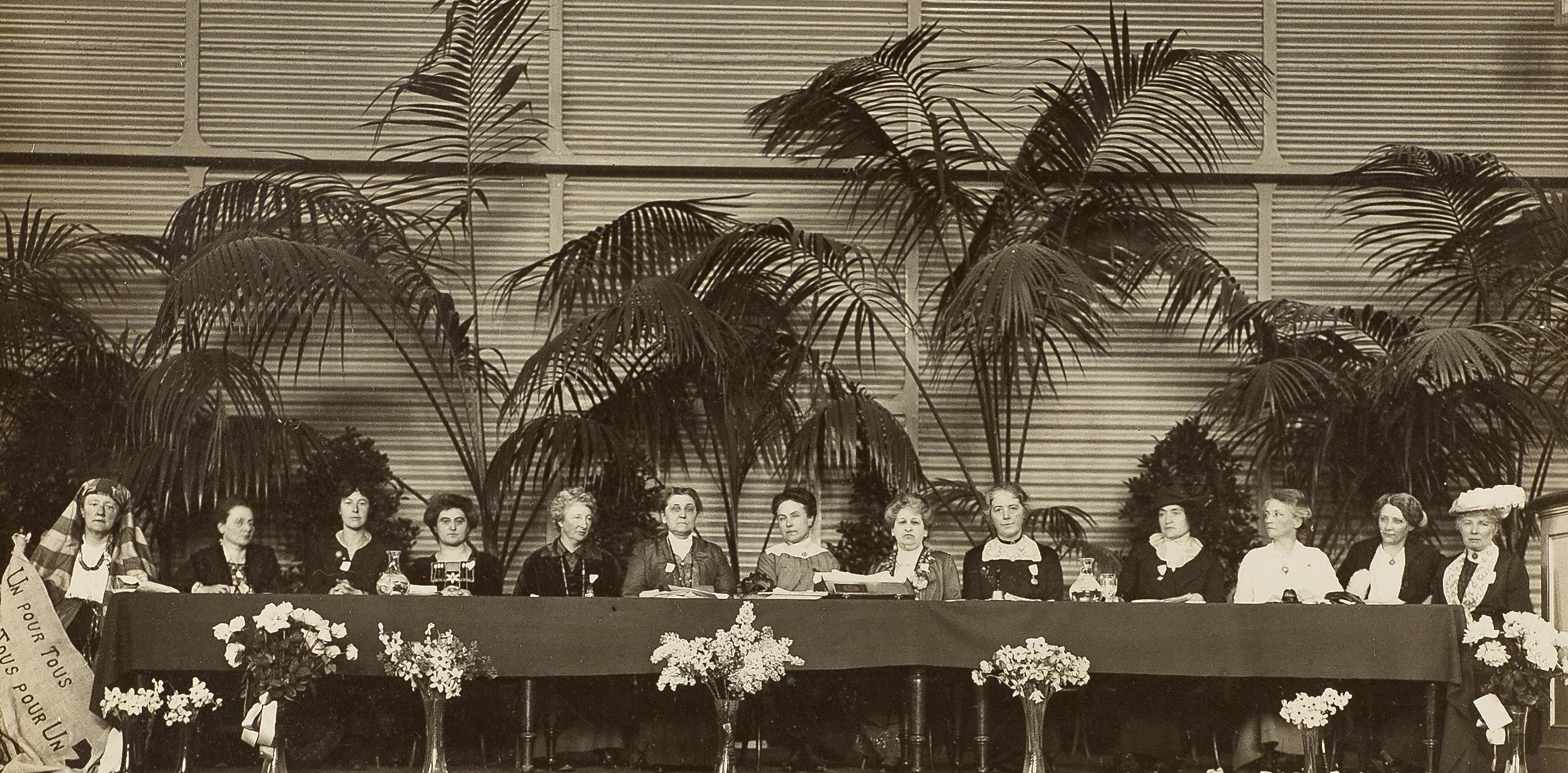
International Congress of Women in 1915. left to right:1. Lucy Thoumaian - Armenia, 2. Leopoldine Kulka - Austria, 3. Laura Hughes - Canada, 4. Rosika Schwimmer - Hungary, 5. Anika Augspurg - Germany, 6. Jane Addams - USA, 7. Eugenie Hanner, 8. Aletta Jacobs - Netherlands, 9. Chrystal Macmillan - UK, 10. Rosa Genoni - Italy, 11. Anna Kleman - Sweden, 12. Thora Daugaard - Denmark, 13. Louise Keilhau - Norway

She and her husband Reverend Professor Garabed Thoumanian were driven out of Armenia and they became exiles in Britain. There, they organised an orphanage and school at Oakhurst in Chigwell for Armenians in 1906.

In 1911, she attended the First Universal Races Congress in London which was an early attempt at anti-racism. Despite being an exile from the Ottoman Empire she had embraced the Turkish delegates as a symbol of the need to work together.

In 1914, she published a manifesto for peace whose theme was "War is man-made, it must be woman undone". She proposed that women should have weekly meetings until the dispute that caused the war was resolved.

In 1915, Thoumaian traveled to The Hague where she represented Armenia at the Women at the Hague conference. She arrived at the conference 25 April 1915. The day before the Armenian genocide started when hundreds of intellectuals were arrested in Armenia.

Thomanian was on the main panel at the conference. After the conference, she stayed in the Netherlands until November. She was busy circulating material, and she was desperate to get information on 30 relatives she last saw in Marsovan in Armenia.

After the war ended, she was pushed forward by the WILPF to work for a League of Nations commission. She continued to work for justices for the victims of the genocide in Armenia.

Thoumaian died in the United States of America in 1940.
