= Anna Kleman =

Swedish women's rights activist and pacifist

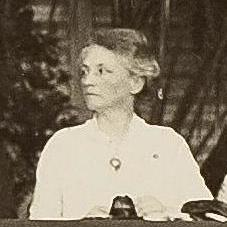
Anna Kleman at the International Congress of Women in 1915

Anna Sofia Kleman (1862–1940) was a Swedish insurance officer and feminist. She is remembered for her work as a women's rights activist and pacifist, especially in regard to voting rights. She participated in the 1911 Stockholm Women's Suffrage Conference and represented Sweden at the 1915 International Women's Peace Conference in the Hague.

When the charity Save the Children was formed in 1919 she was on the board of the Swedish counterpart Rädda Barnen. Eventually she would become the chair of the board.

== Biography ==
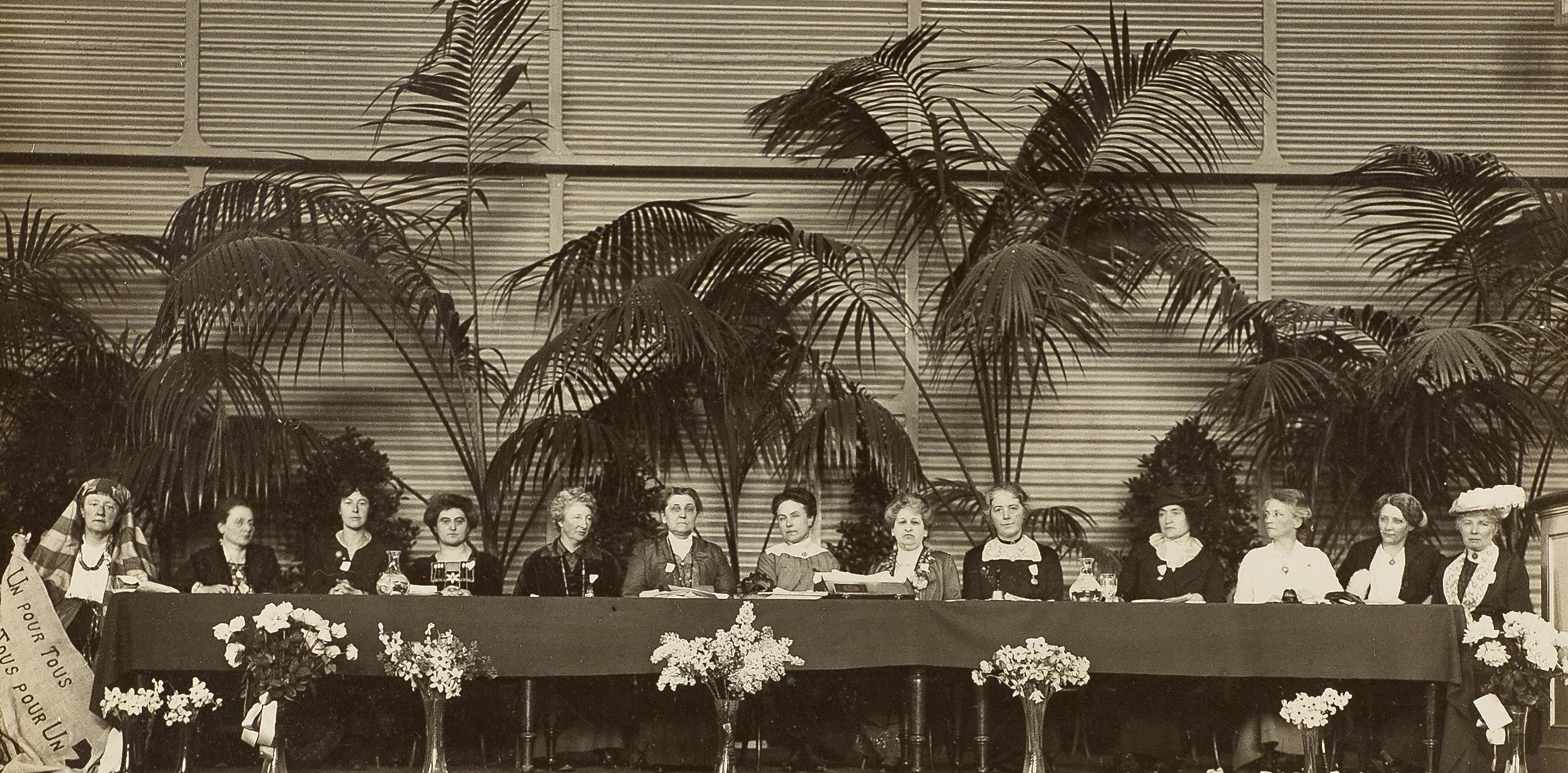
International Congress of Women in 1915. left to right:1. Lucy Thoumaian - Armenia, 2. Leopoldine Kulka, 3. Laura Hughes - Canada, 4. Rosika Schwimmer - Hungary, 5. Anita Augspurg - Germany, 6. Jane Addams - USA, 7. Eugenie Hanner, 8. Aletta Jacobs - Netherlands, 9. Chrystal Macmillan - UK, 10. Rosa Genoni - Italy, 11. Anna Kleman - Sweden, 12. Thora Daugaard - Denmark, 13. Louise Keilhau - Norway

Born in Karlskrona in 1862, Anna Sofia Kleman was the daughter of Commander Carl Kleman (1820–1872) and Johanna Augusta Grahm (1825–1904). Her younger sister, Ellen Kleman (1867–1943), was also active in the women's movement.

By 1895, she was working for the Thule insurance company in Stockholm. From 1903, she was active in Studenter och Arbetare (Students and Workers Association) and from 1906 to 1911, she served on the board of Landsföreningen för kvinnans politiska rösträtt (Association for Women's Political Rights). In 1907 she was elected to the committee of the women's organisation Nya Idun. She was also a proponent of women's voting rights, becoming an active participant at the 1911 Stockholm Suffrage Congress. She also participated in the Women's Peace Congress in the Hague (1915) and the Women's International League for Peace and Freedom congress in Zürich (1919).

As a writer, she contributed articles in support of women's suffrage to the journal Rösträtt för kvinnor (Voting Rights for Women) from 1916.

Kleman became increasingly involved as a peace activist, chairing the Swedish chapter of the Women's International League for Peace and Freedom from 1915 to 1918. In 1925, she attended the International Council of Women convention organized by the National Woman Suffrage Association in Washington, D.C., reporting on the discussions in Hertha, a magazine devoted to the women's movement.

Anna Kleman died in 1940 in Stockholm.

== See also ==
- List of peace activists
