= Laura Hughes (activist) =

Canadian feminist, socialist and pacifist

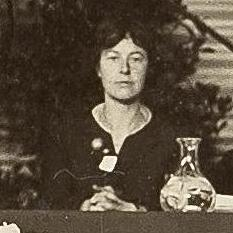
- In 1915 at the WILPF conference in the Hague
- Born: 1886; Toronto, Canada
- Died: 1966 (aged 79–80); Chicago, Illinois
- Occupations: Feminist, socialist, pacifist
- Known for: Women's Peace Party
- Spouse: Erling Lunde
- Children: 2

Laura Hughes Lunde (1886–1966) was a Canadian feminist, socialist and pacifist. She was an outspoken pacifist in Toronto during World War I (1914–18). Towards the end of the war she married and moved to Chicago, where she was active in numerous civic causes for the rest of her life, notably fighting for women's rights and for improvements to education.

== Family ==
Laura Hughes was born in Toronto, Canada in 1886. She was the daughter of James Laughlin Hughes and Adaline Marean Hughes, two well known educators and reformers in Toronto. Her father was chief inspector of the schools in Toronto and her mother was the first kindergarten teacher in Toronto. James Hughes supported the temperance movement, opposed corporal punishment in schools and was a strong believer in hygiene. He passionately supported the British Empire, and launched the cadet movement in Canadian public schools. Her uncle was Sir Sam Hughes, Minister of Militia during World War I.

As a young woman Laura Hughes worked in a mill, and then published a paper that described the abusive working conditions she had found. Based on her experience, she campaigned for reforms to labor laws. She co-founded the Canadian Labour Party.

== World War I ==
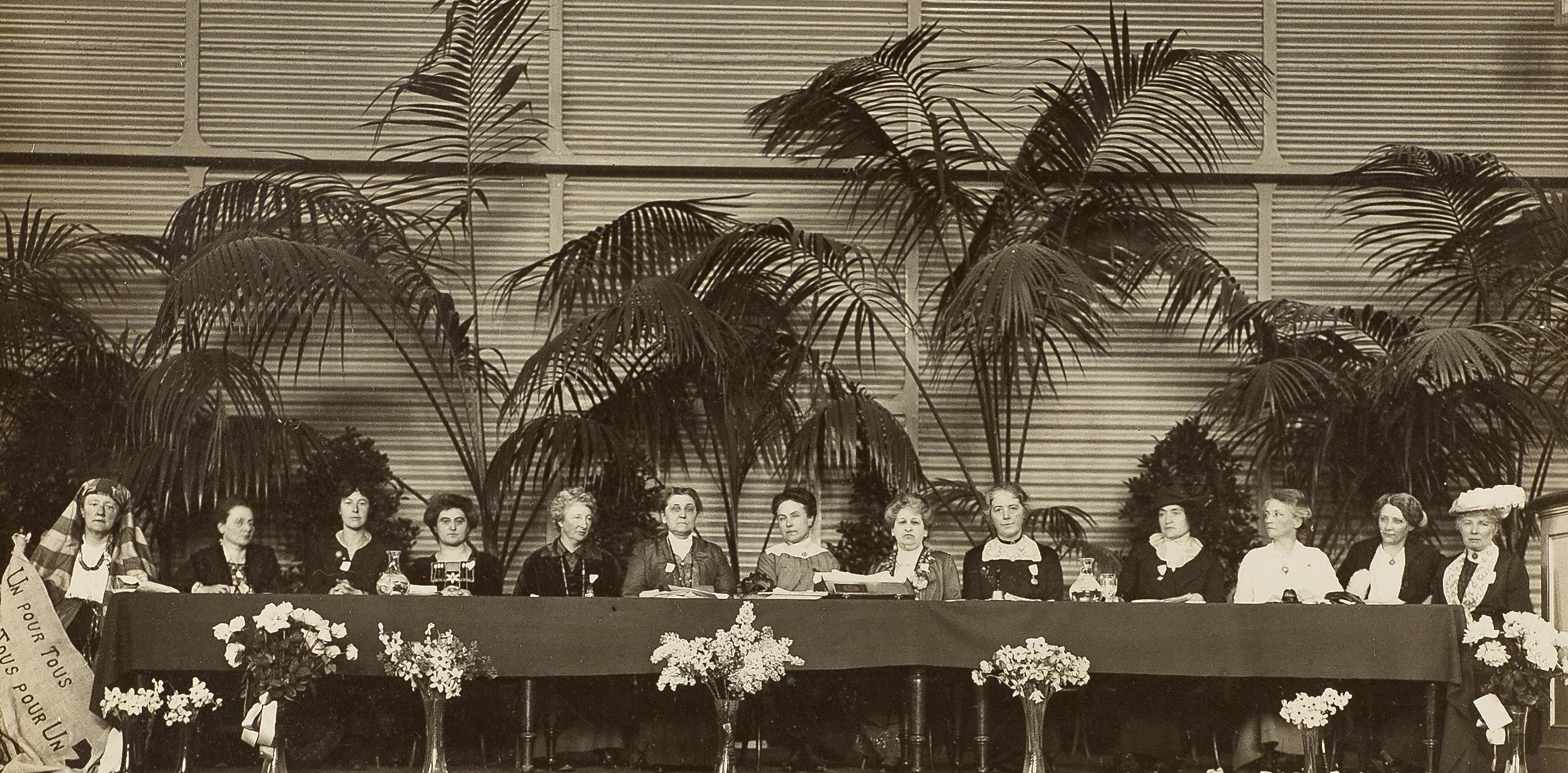
International Congress of Women in 1915. left to right:1. Lucy Thoumaian - Armenia, 2. Leopoldine Kulka, 3. Laura Hughes - Canada, 4. Rosika Schwimmer - Hungary, 5. Anika Augspurg - Germany, 6. Jane Addams - USA, 7. Eugenie Hanner, 8. Aletta Jacobs - Netherlands, 9. Chrystal Macmillan - UK, 10. Rosa Genoni - Italy, 11. Anna Kleman - Sweden, 12. Thora Daugaard - Denmark, 13. Louise Keilhau - Norway

Laura Hughes was active in the pacifist movement during World War I. Her uncle Sir Sam Hughes "offered her a half section of prairie land if she would give up her interest in peace work." She refused. She attended the Women's Peace Conference at The Hague in 1915. At this meeting the International Committee of Women for Permanent Peace was established, with the American Jane Addams as president. Many Canadian women declined to attend, finding that their loyalty to the Empire was stronger than their attachment to pacifism. The press accused women who did attend of having "fallen under the influence of the German plotters at the alleged peace conference.

After returning from Europe, Hughes and other feminists joined with the Toronto Suffrage Association and the Women's Social-Democratic League to establish the Canadian Women's Peace Party (WPP). Co-founders of the WPP were Elsie Charlton and Alice Amelia Chown. The WPP was affiliated with the Women's International League for Peace and Freedom (WILPF). Hughes was an organizer for the Canadian branch of the WILPF. In late October 1916 she wrote that the Canadian branch of the ICWPP was active in every province of Canada apart from British Columbia. Hughes was unusual in claiming that the drive for profits was keeping the war alive. Unlike other pacifist women, she seems to have avoided using maternal feminist arguments. Hughes wrote pessimistically in 1916,

If this is to be the last war, as so many of us hope it will be, it is going to take every ounce of pacifist strength to make it so. The reactionary forces of the world are always stronger after a war. The militarists have more power than ever. And after this war the international armaments trust, which is largely in control of the manufacture of munitions on both sides, will have control of most of the money of the world, and therefore by very powerful; and it won't allow its market to be destroyed if it can help it.

Hughes became associated with the Independent Labour Party (ILP). Hughes spoke publicly against conscription into the armed forces when this became an issue in 1917, and was praised for her stance by the SDPC. Many feminists were opposed to pacifism. Woman's Century responded in late summer 1917 to a report that Hughes and Harriet Dunlop Prenter, described as "prominent suffragists", had drawn a link between suffrage and pacifism in Ontario. According to the editor, Jessie Campbell MacIver, "National Union and Ontario Equal Franchise Association have again and again expressed themselves as repudiating utterly any question of premature peace. Any pacifist literature which has been received from the Hague and elsewhere has been consigned by these societies to the waste-paper basket." Hughes and Prenter seem to have been engaged in a struggle to lead the women's pacifists in Toronto.

== Chicago ==
In December 1917 Laura Hughes married Erling Lunde of Chicago, a conscientious objector, and moved to Chicago. By November 1918 she was a new mother. She was to have two sons, Chester and Leif. Hughes' husband was imprisoned for his stance until the fall of 1920. Laura worked to support conscientious objectors in 1918–20, assisted by her father-in-law.

Laura Lunde spent much time teaching women about their rights and responsibilities as citizens. She also set herself the task of "chasing good government." She and Jane Addams became close friends. Lunde campaigned for laws to regulate child labor, job security for teachers, state assistance for education and electoral reforms. Laura became educational chairman of the Illinois League of Women Voters. She took an active role in the City Club of Chicago. She chaired state committees such as the Joint Committee on Voting Machines and the Illinois Committee for Eradication of Tuberculosis.

In 1939 women gained the right to serve on juries in Illinois. Lunde was the first female foreman of a Federal Grand Jury in the state. She was a member of the "Big 19" in the early 1950s, a lobby group that pushed local government to fight organized crime. She became president of the Civil Service Reform Association. She was involved in organizations such as the Joint Committee on School Affairs, Cook County Health District, Illinois Conference on Legislation, Illinois Civic Exchange and the Illinois State Library.

Laura Hughes Lunde died in 1966. The Ebinger School in Edison Park, Chicago dedicated its Learning Resource Room to her. The Chicago Daily News wrote that "by almost any standard of judgment Mrs. Laura Hughes Lunde ranked as one of Chicago's most useful citizens."

== See also ==
- List of peace activists

== Publications ==
- Lunde, Laura Hughes (1937). The Illinois school system in 1937. Illinois League of Women Voters.
- Lunde, Laura Hughes (1938). The Small Schools of Illinois. Illinois League of Women Voters.
- Lunde, Laura Hughes. Papers, 1931-1967. University of Illinois at Chicago. Archived from the original on 2014-09-03. Reports, pamphlets, memos, correspondence, and newsletters that pertain to the Citizens of Greater Chicago, the National Civic Review, the Illinois Conference on Legislation and the Committee for Modern Courts in Illinois.

== Sources ==
- Alexander, Milnor (1998). ""WHY DO WOMEN DO NOTHING TO END THE WAR?" An essay by Barbara Roberts". Canadian Woman Studies. 9 (1).
- Campbell, Peter (2010-11-02). Rose Henderson: A Woman for the People. McGill-Queen's Press – MQUP. ISBN 978-0-7735-3764-4.
- Early, Frances H. (1997). A World Without War: How U.S. Feminists and Pacifists Resisted World War I. Syracuse University Press. p. 127. ISBN 978-0-8156-2764-7.
- Howard, Irene (1992-10-01). The Struggle for Social Justice in British Columbia: Helena Gutteridge, the Unknown Reformer. UBC Press. ISBN 978-0-7748-0425-7.
- "Laura Hughes Lunde papers". University of Illinois at Chicago.
- "Lunde, Laura Hughes. Laura Hughes Lunde papers 1931–1967". Chicago Collections Consortium. Archived from the original on 2014-09-03.
- Newton, Janice (1995-01-01). The Feminist Challenge to the Canadian Left, 1900–1918. McGill-Queen's Press – MQUP. ISBN 978-0-7735-1291-7.
- Roberts, Barbara (1985), ""Why do Women do Nothing to End the War?": Laura Hughes" (PDF), The CRIAW Papers, no. 13, archived from the original (PDF) on 2015-04-06
- Roberts, Barbara (1996-06-18), Reconstructed World: A Feminist Biography of Gertrude Richardson, McGill-Queen's Press – MQUP, ISBN 978-0-7735-1394-5
