= Louise Keilhau =

Norwegian teacher and peace activist

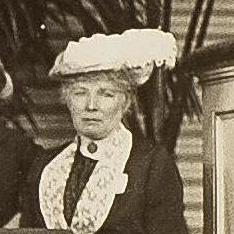
- in 1915 at the Hague
- Born: Louise Ottesen; 1860
- Died: 1927 (aged 66–67)
- Occupation: teacher
- Known for: peace activist
- Children: Wilhelm Keilhau

Louise Keilhau (1860–1927) was a Norwegian teacher and peace activist. She founded the Norwegian Committee for Permanent Peace and she was a founding member of the Women's International League for Peace and Freedom (WILPF).

== Life ==
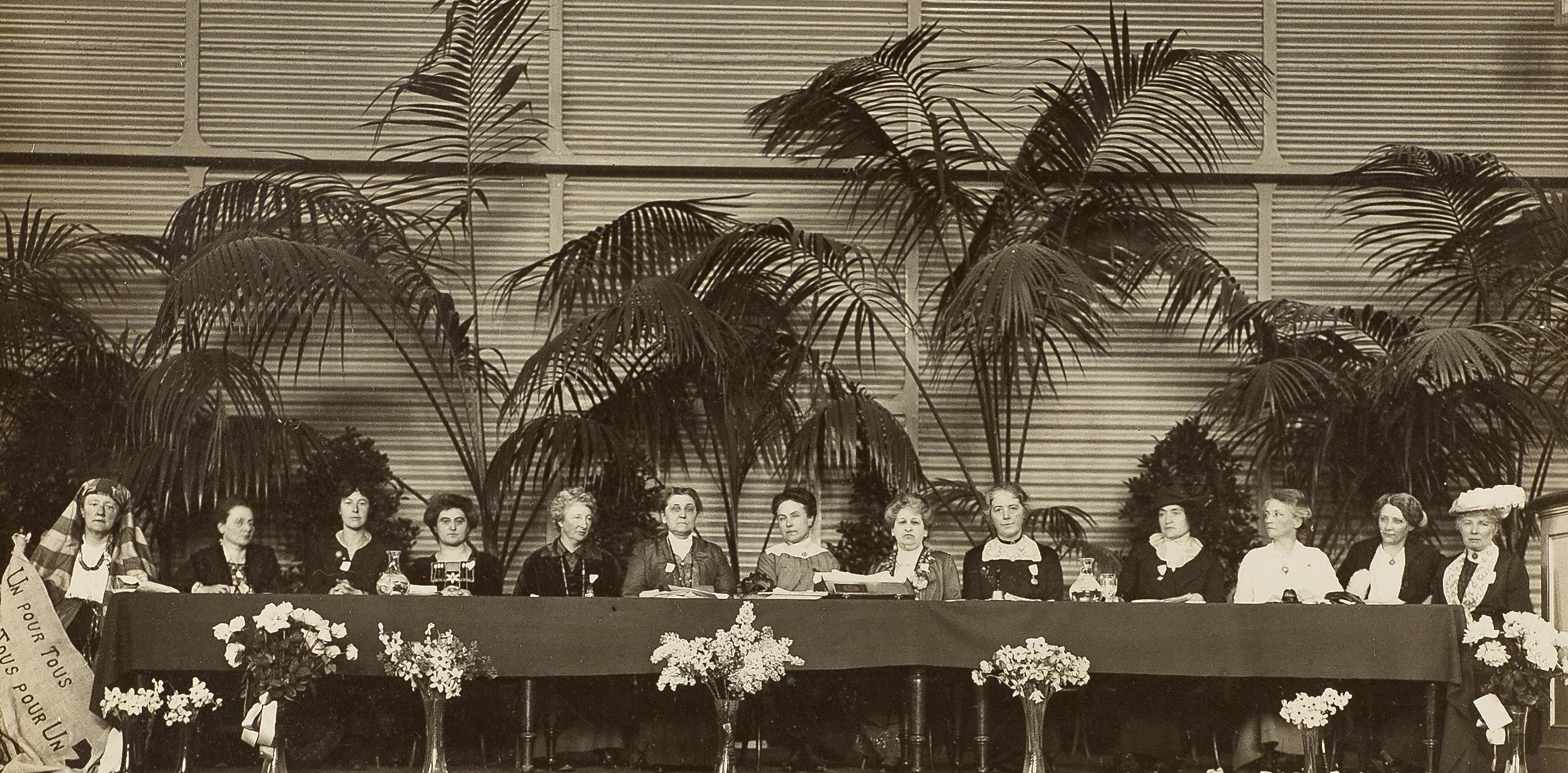
International Congress of Women in 1915. left to right:1. Lucy Thoumaian - Armenia, 2. Leopoldine Kulka, 3. Laura Hughes - Canada, 4. Rosika Schwimmer - Hungary, 5. Anika Augspurg - Germany, 6. Jane Addams - USA, 7. Eugenie Hanner, 8. Aletta Jacobs - Netherlands, 9. Chrystal Macmillan - UK, 10. Rosa Genoni - Italy, 11. Anna Kleman - Sweden, 12. Thora Daugaard - Denmark, 13. Louise Keilhau - Norway

Keilhau realised that war was coming in the early part of the twentieth century and she traveled internationally to make ready. She was a leading member of the Norwegian Red Cross.

Keilhau was credited with inspiring the Norwegian Red Cross to take an active role to relieve suffering during the First World War. She was the only woman on the Red Cross's executive board and, with the support of other women, encouraged the Norwegian Red Cross to look up from its domestic problems.

In 1915 she was chosen as the Norwegian delegate to a peace conference in the Hague. Delegates were called from around the world although many had difficulties attending because the peace efforts were "only" of women and hostilities made travel difficult. At the conference, she proposed resolution 28 that "We women, in International Congress assembled, protest against the madness and horror of war, involving as it does a reckless sacrifice of human life and the destruction of so much that humanity has laboured through centuries to build up."

She founded the Norwegian Committee for Permanent Peace and she was a founding member of the Women's International League for Peace and Freedom (WILPF).

== Personal life ==
She was the mother of economist and historian Wilhelm Keilhau.
