= Leopoldine Kulka =

Austrian writer and editor

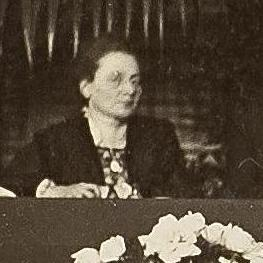
- Kulka in 1915
- Born: 31 March 1872; Vienna, Austria-Hungary
- Died: 2 January 1920 (aged 47); Vienna, First Austrian Republic
- Occupation: Peace activist

Leopoldine Kulka (31 March 1872 – 2 January 1920) was an Austrian writer and editor. As editor of Neues Frauenleben she controversially met women from combatant countries at the 1915 Women's conference at the Hague which led to the creation of the Women's International League for Peace and Freedom (WILPF).

== Life ==
Kulka was born in Vienna in 1872. She joined the radical General Austrian Women's Association (GAWA) before she was thirty. She also became interested in peace issues at the start of the century. She was writing regularly for political magazines for women. In 1902 Auguste Fickert started an Austrian magazine which she called Neues Frauenleben, and after her death (1910) Kulka became its editor together with Christine Touallion and Emil Fickert. In 1904 she and Adele Gerber went to Berlin to help found the International Women's Suffrage Alliance.

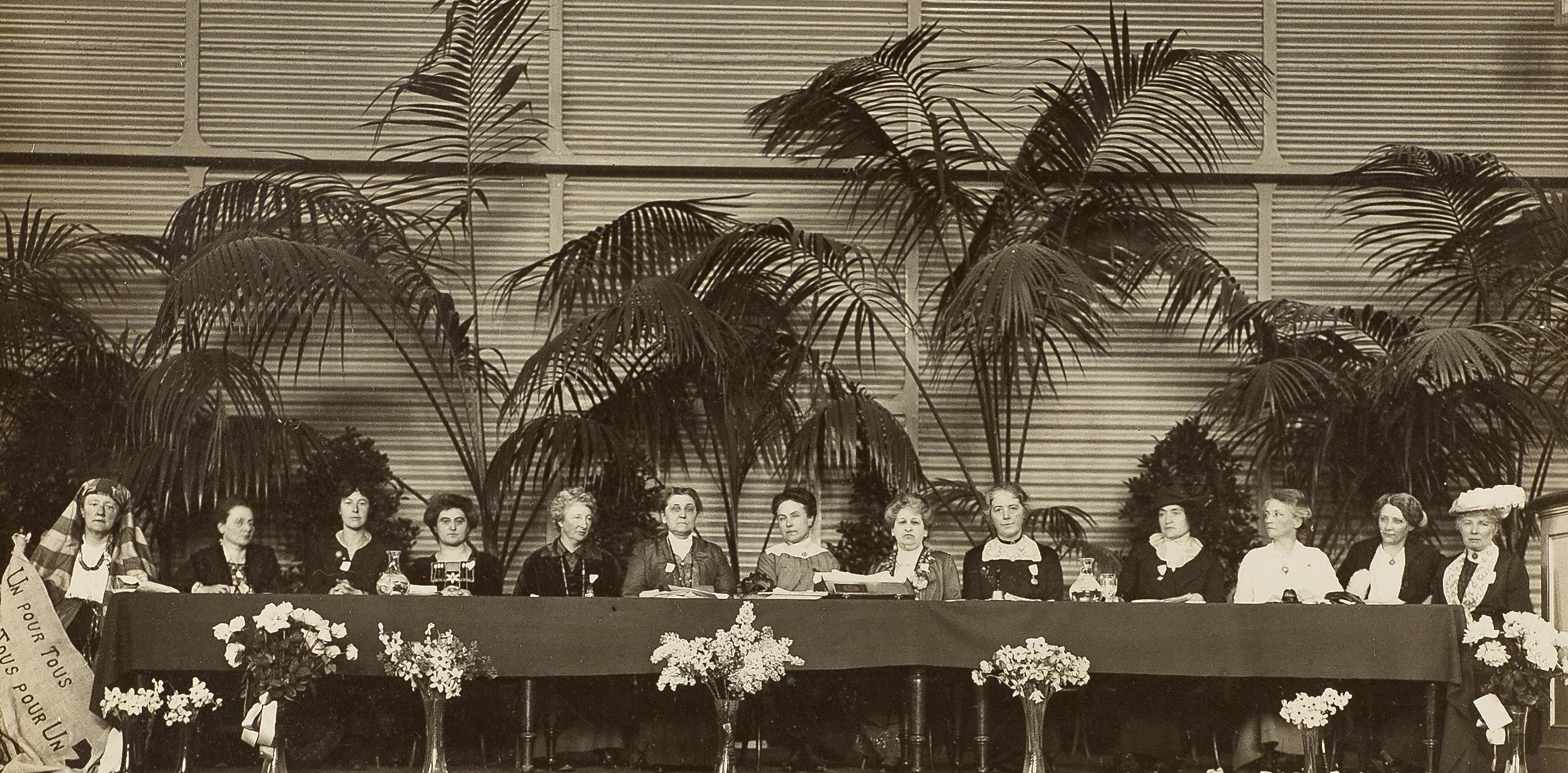
International Congress of Women in 1915. left to right:1. Lucy Thoumaian - Armenia, 2. Leopoldine Kulka - Austria, 3. Laura Hughes - Canada, 4. Rosika Schwimmer - Hungary, 5. Anika Augspurg - Germany, 6. Jane Addams - USA, 7. Eugenie Hamer - Belgium, 8. Aletta Jacobs - Netherlands, 9. Chrystal Macmillan - UK, 10. Rosa Genoni - Italy, 11. Anna Kleman - Sweden, 12. Thora Daugaard - Denmark, 13. Louise Keilhau - Norway

In 1911, she became vice-president of the GAWA.

In 1914, she had helped translate Women and Labour by Olive Schreiner into German. The South African Schreiner argued that women understood the value of life more than men.

Despite a lot of debate about the value of a women's peace conference, she was the delegate chosen in 1915. She traveled to The Hague where she represented Austria at the Women at the Hague conference. This was during the first World War but even then she raised 1,000 signatures of support. She and Olga Misař were supported by the magazine Neues Frauenleben. On their return they both made reports to the magazine about the conference noting the difficulties that some delegates had in attending the conference. The delegation from Britain was trimmed by the Foreign Office to 24 delegates and actually only two made it to the Hague. Italy only managed one delegate, Rosa Genoni, and she was keen to note that she did not represent her country. Laura Hughes came from Canada to represent what was called at the time "the Colonies".

In 1917, she led the peace section of the GAWA. In 1919 the war had finished and Kulka horrified Jane Addams and other delegates as she described the demoralising effects of starvation.

Kulka died in Vienna in January 1920.
