= Wilhelm Keilhau =

Norwegian historian and economist

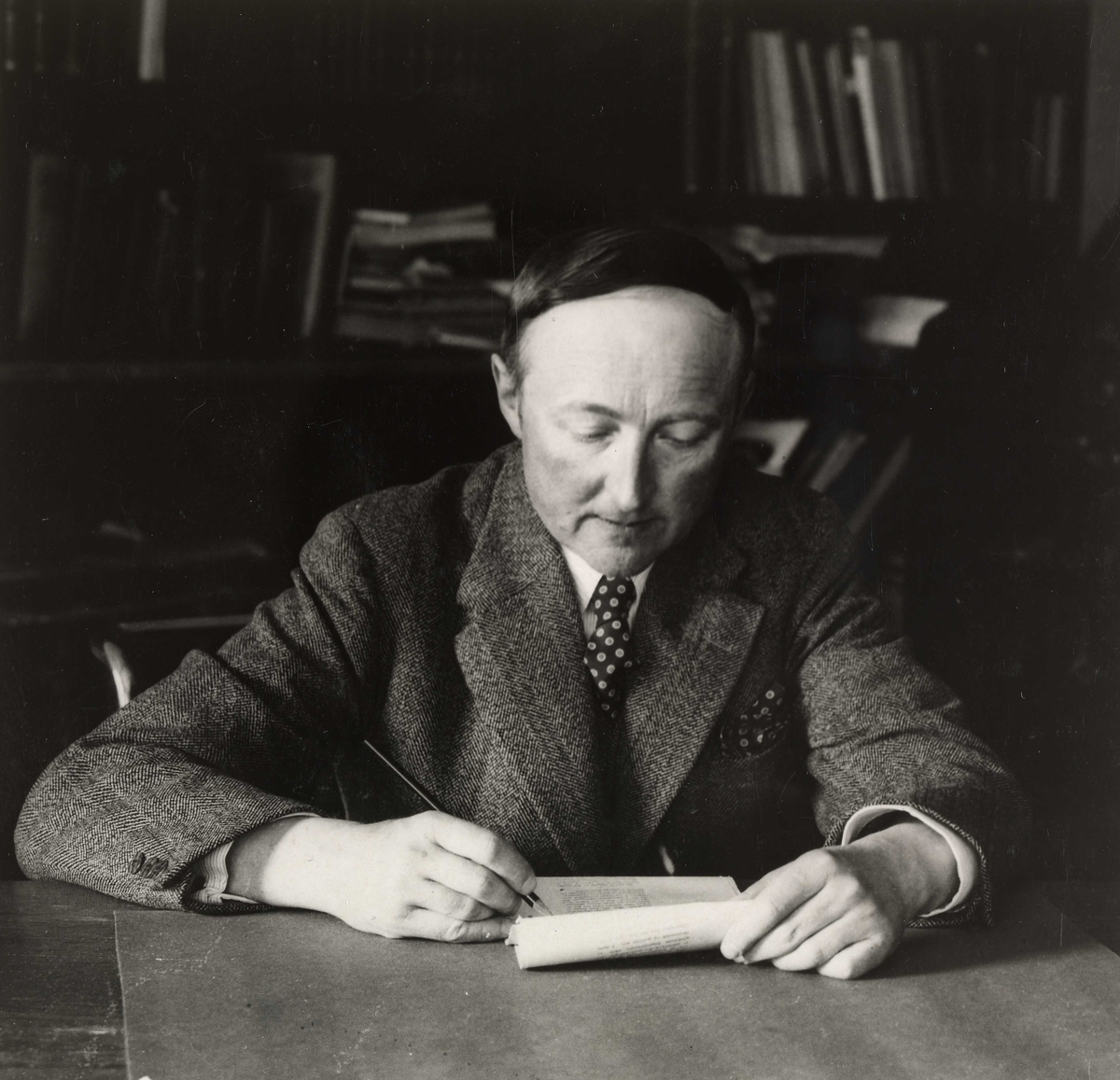
- Born: 30 July 1888; Kristiania, Norway
- Died: 9 June 1954 (aged 65); Oslo
- Occupations: Historian and economist
- Parent: Louise Keilhau

Wilhelm Christian Ottesen Keilhau (30 July 1888 – 9 June 1954) was a Norwegian historian and economist.

== Personal life ==
Keilhau was born in Kristiania on 30 July 1888, to Harald Keilhau and Louise Ottesen. He was married twice, first to Rachel Greiner in 1915, and second time to Rita Wilhelma Steensrud.

== Career ==
He was appointed professor at the University of Oslo from 1934. Among his works are his thesis Grundrentelæren from 1917 and Die Wertungslehre from 1923. In addition to his academic career, Keilhau also engaged in other activities. He published two novels and a poetry collection. He was CEO of Norway's first airline company, Det norske Luftfartsrederi, in 1918. During World War II he was a member of the board of directors of the London department of Norges Bank.
