= Kathleen Courtney =

British suffragist and peace campaigner (1878–1974)

Dame Kathleen D'Olier Courtney DBE
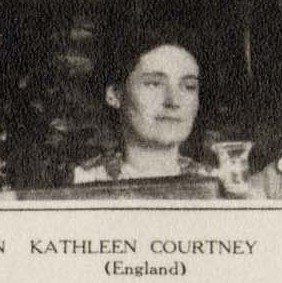
- Kathleen Courtney in 1915
- Born: 11 March 1878; Gillingham, Kent, England, UK
- Died: 9 December 1974 (aged 96); London, England, UK
- Burial place: St. Martin in the Fields
- Known for: Suffragist, peace activist

Dame Kathleen D'Olier Courtney, DBE (11 March 1878 – 9 December 1974) was a leader in the suffragist movement in the United Kingdom.

== Life ==
Kathleen D'Olier Courtney was born the youngest of five daughters and the fifth of seven children of Lieutenant (later Major) David Charles Courtney (1845-1909) of the Royal Engineers (a native of Milltown, County Dublin, Ireland), and his wife, Alice Margaret (née Mann) at 1 York Terrace, in Gillingham, Kent on 11 March 1878.

Courtney was educated at the private Anglo-French College in Kensington and the Manse boarding-school in Malvern, Worcestershire, before spending seven months in Dresden studying the German language. In January 1897 she went to Lady Margaret Hall to study modern languages. There she formed a lifetime friendship with Maude Royden.

The Courtney family were wealthy, allowing Kathleen the freedom to devote her life to good causes. In 1908 she was appointed secretary of the North of England Society for Women's Suffrage. One of its members, Helena Swanwick, later revealed that Courtney arrived in Manchester "with a big reputation" as an outstanding organiser.

In 1911, she moved to London where she worked closely with Millicent Fawcett, an English feminist, intellectual, political and union leader. She also became a writer and honorary secretary of the National Union of Women's Suffrage Societies. She lived in Hampstead with Hilda Clark, Edith Pye and Edith Eckhart.

Upon the outbreak of World War I in 1914, she abandoned her active campaigning for women's suffrage and devoted her life to studying international politics and trying to build bridges towards international cooperation.

In April 1915, Aletta Jacobs, a suffragist in the Netherlands, invited suffrage members from around the world to an International Congress of Women in The Hague. The attendees included Mary Sheepshanks, Jane Addams, Grace Abbott, Lida Gustava Heymann, Emmeline Pethick-Lawrence, Emily Hobhouse, Chrystal Macmillan and Rosika Schwimmer. At the conference the women formed the Women's International League for Peace and Freedom (WIL).

Courtney ultimately was elected as chair of the British section. In 1928, she became a member of the Executive Committee of the British League of Nations Union and in 1939 (the year World War II would begin) was elected Vice-Chairman. From 1949 to 1951 she served as Chairman.

Courtney continued to be involved in the campaign for women's suffrage. She helped establish the Adult Suffrage Society in 1916 and as joint secretary she lobbied members of the House of Commons to extend the franchise until the Qualification of Women Act was passed in 1918. The following year she became vice-president of the National Union of Societies for Equal Citizenship. As well as advocating the same voting rights as men, the organisation also campaigned for equal pay, fairer divorce laws and an end to the discrimination against women in the professions.

In 1945, she became deputy of the United Nations Association, rising four years later to be joint president and chair of the UNA's executive committee.

Courtney was appointed a CBE in 1946 and in 1972 she was promoted to DBE. In 1968 she had the honour of giving a talk in Westminster to celebrate 50 years of some women having the vote.

In 1972 she was awarded the United Nations Peace Medal.

In March 1977, as part of the Suffrage Interviews project, titled Oral evidence on the suffragette and suffragist movements: the Brian Harrison interviews, the historian, Brian Harrison, conducted an interview about Courtney with Elisabeth Furlong, who was Courtney's first cousin once removed, (related to the Mann's on her mother's side). She spoke about Courtney's family and schooling, time at Lady Margaret Hall, and her attitudes and experiences in old age.

== Death and legacy ==
Kathleen Courtney died at her home at 3 Elm Tree Court, London, on 9 December 1974 at age 96. She never married or had children. A memorial service was held on 11 April 1975 at St Martin-in-the-Fields in London.

A mural of Courtney was included in a series of murals displayed in Gillingham between 2022-2023 as part of Medway Libraries' Circle of Six project.
