= Rosa Genoni =

Activist and fashion designer

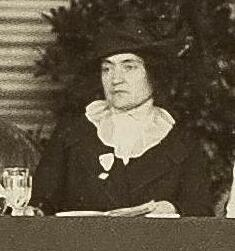
- Born: 1867; Tirano, Italy
- Died: 1954 (aged 86–87); Varese, Italy
- Known for: women's rights advocate pacifist Italian fashion

Rosa Genoni (1867–1954) was an Italian seamstress, fashion designer, teacher, feminist and advocate for workers' rights. She had a successful fashion design career, with innovative designs such as her Tanagra dress. In 1915, Genoni was the Italian delegate at the International Congress of Women, The Hague, Netherlands. Her activism efforts along with her desire to make Italy a fashion leader were thwarted under Fascism.

== Biography ==
Rosa Genoni (1867–1954) was born in the town of Tirano in Lombardy, about 40 miles from Milan. She was the eldest of 19 children, 12 surviving. She moved to Milan at ten years old to look for a job, and found one at a relative's dressmaker shop. By the age of eighteen, she qualified as a master seamstress. During this time she began to associate with those in Milan's socialist circles. She was a strong advocate for emancipation of women, and for their right to have access to education.

Between 1884 and 1885, Genoni was sent to Paris as a delegate of the Italian Workers' Party, the predecessor to the Italian Socialist Party. She was the only woman to attend. Genoni remained in Paris and found work in a small Italian seamstress shop. While there, she immersed herself in the fashion world, perfecting her tailoring and embroidery techniques and going on to work in well-known and established fashion houses.

Genoni soon moved back to Milan, determined to develop a 'Made in Italy' sensibility and bring awareness to the creative production in her home nation. Her activism pursuits unabated, she advocated on behalf of women's wage demands and participated in the protests against the exploitation of women's labor. While active in those causes, she met other women involved in socialist and feminist movements. The journalist, Anna Maria Mozzoni invited Genoni to participate in the Socialist-Labourist International Congress in Zurich. Genoni was also active with other women at the early days of the Lega femminile, which grouped seamstresses and milliners. This organization was an important advocate linking women's work in the clothing industry and production, to the wider context of the women's movement towards emancipation, the right to education, and equality. At one of the seamstress' protests Genoni met feminist and socialist leader, Anna Kuliscioff. Kulischoff became a customer of Genoni and a loyal friend.

From the 1880s onwards, Genoni became more and more involved in the feminist movement, first with the radical left of Abigail Zanetta (1875–1945) and then with the more moderate and reformist ideas of Anna Kulishoff. Continuing the parallel threads of activism and fashion in her life, she was hired in 1895 by Maison H. Haardt et Fils, at that time an important Milanese fashion house with branches in Sanremo, Lucerna and St. Moritz. Genoni was promoted to Premiere in 1903, the same year her daughter Fanny was born out of her relationship with her companion, the lawyer Alfredo Podreider, who she met when she was part of the circle of Pietro Gori.

In 1905, Genoni added teaching the history of costume at the Professional School for Women at the Societa Umanitaria in Milan to her job at Maison H. Haardt et Fils and to her commitment to activism for peace and women's rights. She also directed the dress-making department at the Societa Umanitaria, a job she held until 1925, at which time she refused to swear an oath of loyalty to fascism.

== Milan International (1906) ==
At the time of the Milan Expo in 1906, Genoni was still working as a Premiere at the Milanese branch of Maison Haardt et Fils, mainly reproducing Parisian models. When she suggested participating, her boss responded that it was impossible because they were known for copying Parisian fashions. Yet, he did add that she can exhibit on her own behalf, which she did proudly.

Genoni ended up preparing designs twice for the Expo. After a fire broke out on the grounds of the fair, devastating the building that housed Genoni's creations along with others, Genoni scrambled to complete new dresses for the Expo in a very short amount of time. Ultimately, Genoni achieved the recognition for her talents as a designer of dresses 'Made in Italy' that she craved: she was awarded the International Jury Grand Prix for two creations that were put on show at the Expo.

Genoni documented her participation in the Expo in a booklet, Al visitatore (To the visitor 1906). In this booklet, Genoni expressed her intention to create a homegrown Italian fashion and style as an integral part of the rebirth of the arts in Italy at the time and a contribution to the building of a national identity.

== Fashion ==
Rosa Genoni's inspiration came from three distinct periods: early Renaissance, Greco-Roman and classical antiquity, and the modern. Evening wear were inspired by the Renassaince painters Sandro Botticelli (Primavera) and Pisanello. She incorporated draping, folding, girding and pinning, building in the ability for the wearer to transform her Tanagra dress. The Tanagra dress was inspired by draping in the Tanagra figurines. The third period inspired by the modern energy exemplified in transportation and mobility led to a collection of casual wear, including dresses suitable for air travel.

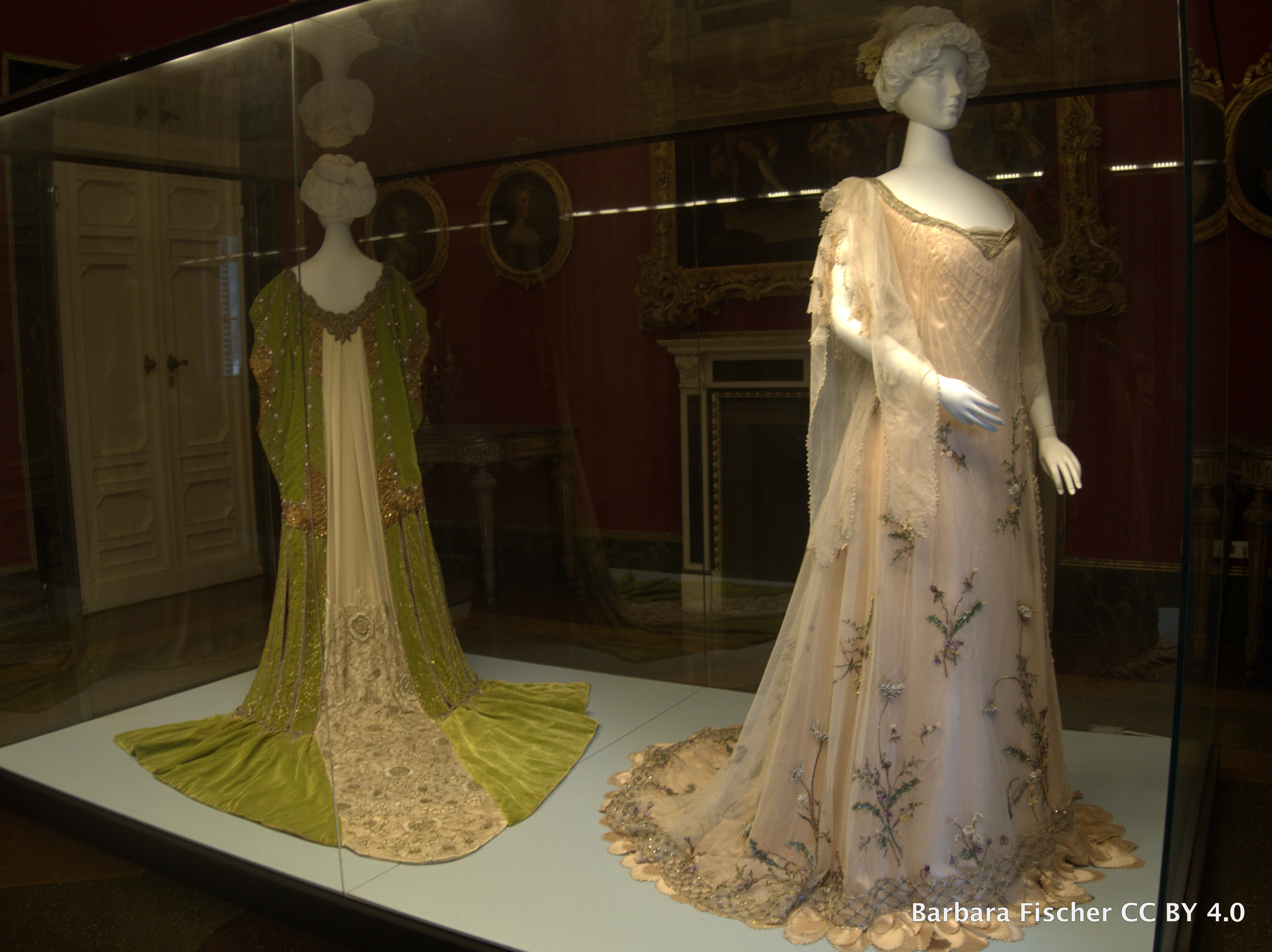

== Activism ==
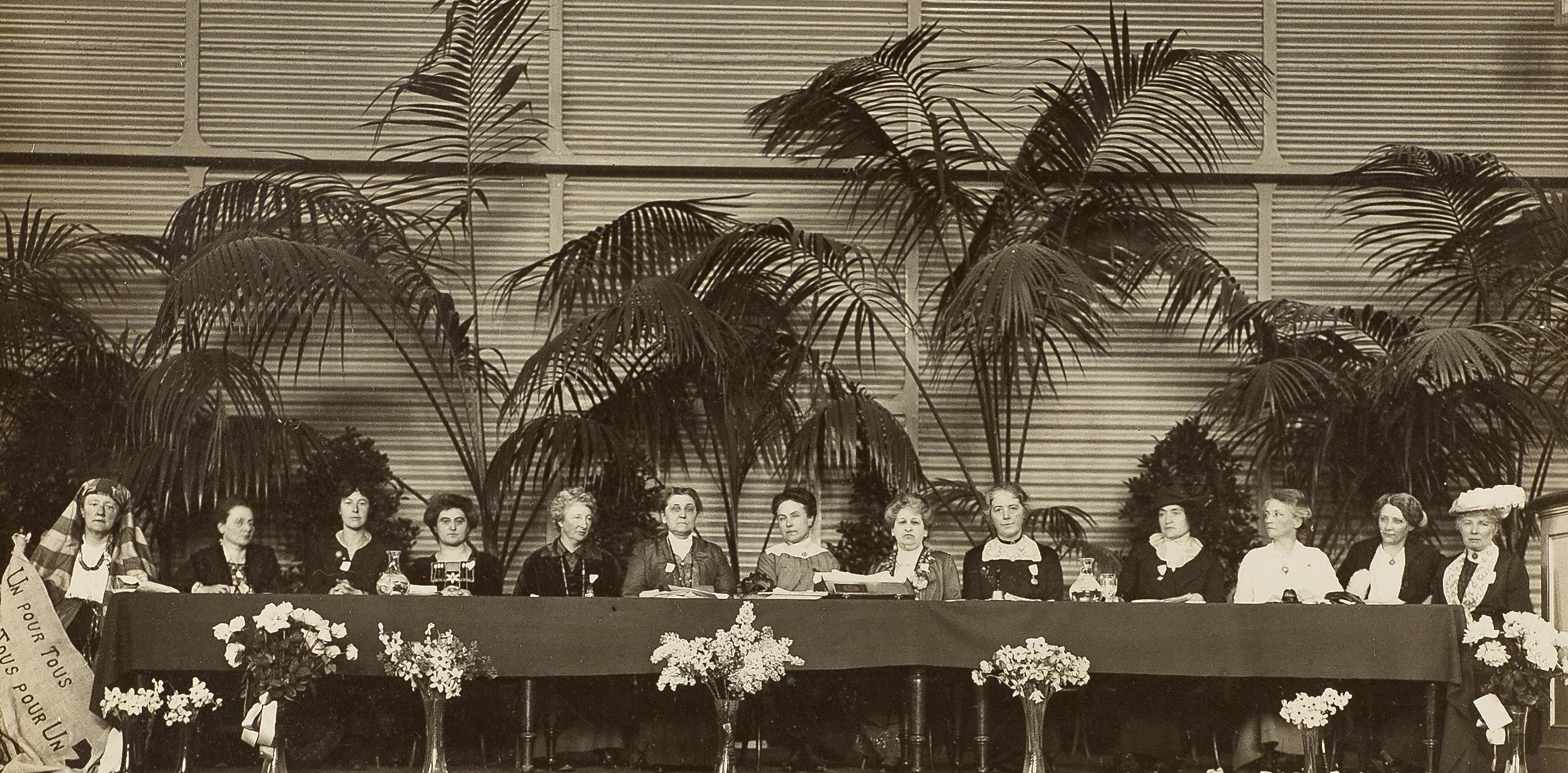
International Congress of Women in 1915. left to right:1. Lucy Thoumaian - Armenia, 2. Leopoldine Kulka, 3. Laura Hughes - Canada, 4. Rosika Schwimmer - Hungary, 5. Anika Augspurg - Germany, 6. Jane Addams - USA, 7. Eugenie Hanner, 8. Aletta Jacobs - Netherlands, 9. Chrystal Macmillan - UK, 10. Rosa Genoni - Italy, 11. Anna Kleman - Sweden, 12. Thora Daugaard - Denmark, 13. Louise Keilhau - Norway

As noted above, Rosa Genoni actively worked towards bringing attention to the plight of workers, the lack of equal rights between men and women, and anti-war efforts and maintaining peace. In April, 1906, the first National Congress of Italian Women took place in Rome. This was the first official national meeting of the various women's associations and groups from all over Italy, grouped together as a council, Consiglio Nazionale delle Donne Italiane (CNDI). Founded in 1903, CNDI was the Italian branch of the International Council of Women founded in Washington in 1888. The Roman Congress was the first public and national forum in Italy of the women's feminist movement. The week long congress was organized around six themes: 1) Education and Instruction; 2) Assistance and Prevention; 3) Moral and Juridical Condition of Women; 4) Hygiene; 5) Art and Women's Literature; 6) Emigration. Rosa Genoni was one of the official speakers in the fifth section and delivered a speech entitled, "The Art of Dressing."

Along with many other notable women, including Jane Addams and Rosika Schwimmer, Rosa Genoni attended the International Congress of Women, which convened from 28 April to 1 May 1915 in The Hague, Netherlands. Rosa was the sole Italian delegate at the Congress and represented a number of Italian suffragist and pacifist organisations.

Rosa Genoni was monitored by the local security forces due to her pacifist activities and involvement in the anti-war campaign. Documents in her file indicate that she was identified as "subversive", "socialist", and "anarchist". She was refused a passport to travel at times. Despite the surveillance that she was subjected to and under threat during the years of the Great War and Fascism, Genoni continued to advocate for peace. She attacked the Futurists' position in favor of the war and wrote plainly about her stance in articles published in a socialist paper, L'Avanti.

By 1935, the fascist regime was controlling Italian daily life. Under these circumstances, Genoni had abandoned her dream of building an "Italian fashion" and a more democratic and egalitarian society that defended the rights of the lower classes.

== Anthroposophy ==
Rosa Genoni was a keen anthroposophist interested in the spiritual teachings of the Austrian philosopher Rudolf Steiner. She introduced the youngest of her siblings, the Italian artist Ernesto Genoni, to the Anthroposophy Society meetings in Milan. Ernesto subsequently migrated to Australia where he introduced his brothers, farming in Western Australia, to Anthroposophy, he cofounded the first Anthroposophy group and established the first biodynamic farm in Melbourne, Australia. So Rosa had a seminal role in disseminating the teachings of Rudolf Steiner to Australia.
