= L'Avenir (Belgian newspaper) =

French-language Belgian daily newspaper

- L'Avenir est au Contenu ("The Future is in Content")
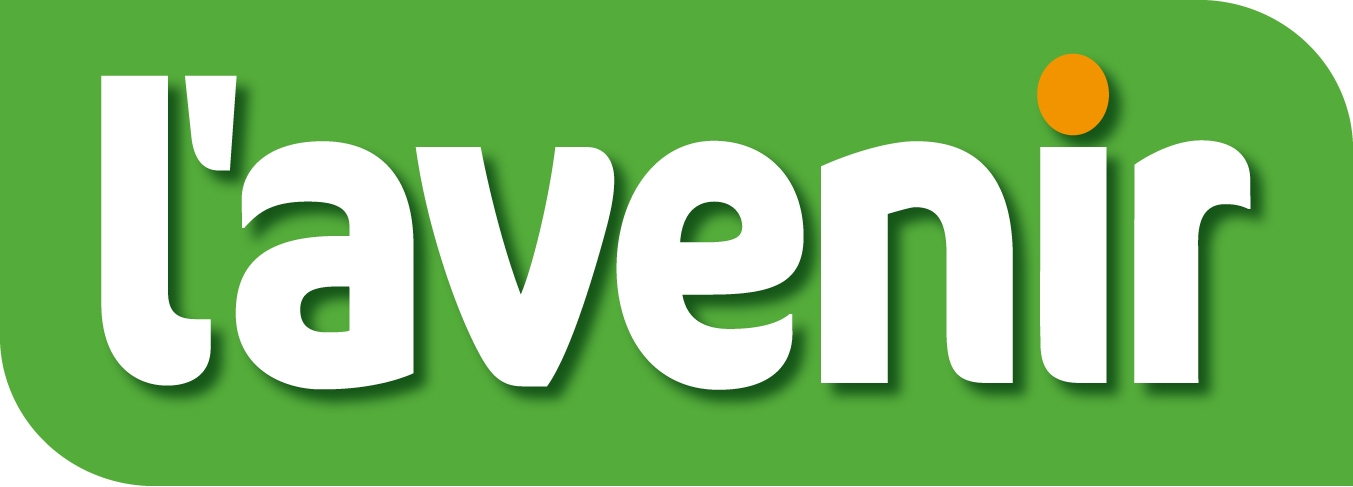
- Owner: Tecteo
- Founder: René Delforge
- Founded: November 19, 1918; 107 years ago
- Political alignment: Regional Press
- Headquarters: Route de Hannut 38; 5004 Bouge (Belgium)
- Circulation: 94,000 (as of 2014)
- Sister newspapers: Nostalgie Wallonie
- Website: www.lavenir.net

L'Avenir (French pronunciation: [lavniʁ], lit. 'The Future'), formerly Vers l'Avenir (French pronunciation: [vɛʁ -], lit. 'Towards the Future'), is a Belgian newspaper franchise based in Namur. It is one of the largest media groups in Belgium. The group publishes nine regional newspapers in French, grouped since June 2010 under the brand name L'Avenir.

== History ==
The Namur daily newspaper Vers l'Avenir has been published since 19 November 1918. It succeeded the Catholic daily L'Ami de l'Ordre, published from August 6, 1839 to November 18, 1918. Namur was occupied by the German Army in August 1914, early in the First World War, and though the German administration permitted L'Ami de l'Ordre to continue publishing, they closely controlled the contents of the paper. The paper's management wavered between collaboration with the occupation and resistance to German troops. When the Armistice of 11 November 1918 was announced and the German troops evacuated the city, the Bishop of Namur, Monsignor Heylen, removed Victor Delvaux as publisher and negotiated a management contract with and leased the premises to René Delforge. Delforge, together with the elites of Namur's Catholic Party (Max Wasseige, Fernand Golenvaux, Henri Bribosia, Adrien de Montpellier and Albert d'Huart) founded a new Catholic newspaper Vers l'Avenir. Delvaux was forced to flee and though the Liege court of appeal acquitted him of collaboration offences in February 1922, a few months later Delvaux finally sold the premises and printing equipment to the bishop.

Vers l'Avenir survived the Second World War rather better than L'Ami de l'Ordre had the First World War and was in a position to expand from Namur. It founded or acquired newspapers in the region including L'Avenir du Luxembourg in 1948, Le Courrier (in Verviers) in 1956 and L'Avenir - Le Courrier de l'Escaut (Tournai, in 1965).

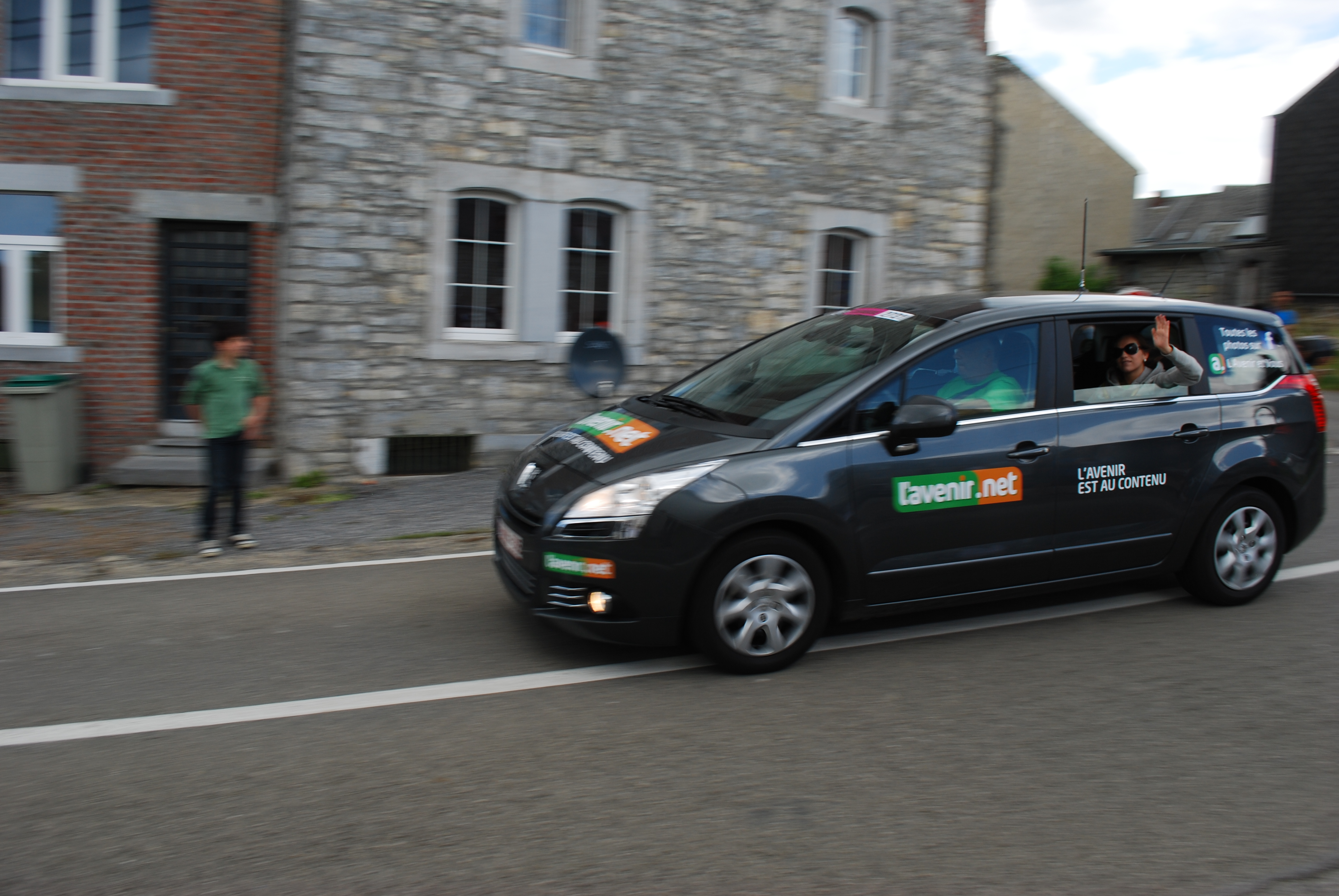
L'Avenir sponsored cycle team

In May 1983, Vers l'Avenir launched its own radio on the 100.0 MHz frequency in the Namur region which broadcast until the early 1990s.

In 1999, the diocese of Namur sold its 74% share in the capital of the paper to the Corelio printing and publishing group, which also publishes the Flemish dailies De Standaard and Het Nieuwsblad. Corelio acquired the remaining shares in 2005. The Corelio group closed the Rhisnes printing works and since then the l'Avenir newspapers have been printed at Groot-Bijgaarden. In 2013, Corelio divested l'Avenir to the Liège-based Tecteo energy group for 26 million euros.

== Editions ==
L'Avenir publishes nine editions covering different cities and provinces within French-speaking Belgium. The nine daily editions are as follows:

- L'Avenir Namur / Dinant
- L'Avenir Basse Sambre
- L'Avenir Entre-Sambre and Meuse
- L'Avenir Brabant
- L'Avenir Luxembourg
- L'Avenir Verviers
- L'Avenir de Huy-Waremme
- L'Avenir - Le Courrier de l'Escaut (Tournai)
- L'Avenir Mouscron

L'Avenir also publishes a weekly for younger (9–13 years) readers:

- JDE - Journal Des Enfants

== Internet ==
All of the newspaper editions share a common website edition, lavenir.net that covers regional and national news as well as sports results throughout Belgium. It is also available in a mobile version for smartphones.

== Circulation ==
The newspapers had in 2007 a combined circulation of 109,000 copies. This decreased to 94,000 units in 2014 for a paid sales of 84,000 copies, of which about 2.5% represents digital subscriptions (CIM figures). This decline of about 10% is significantly lower than the loss of 22% for the total of the francophone daily press in Belgium over the same period.

== Archives ==
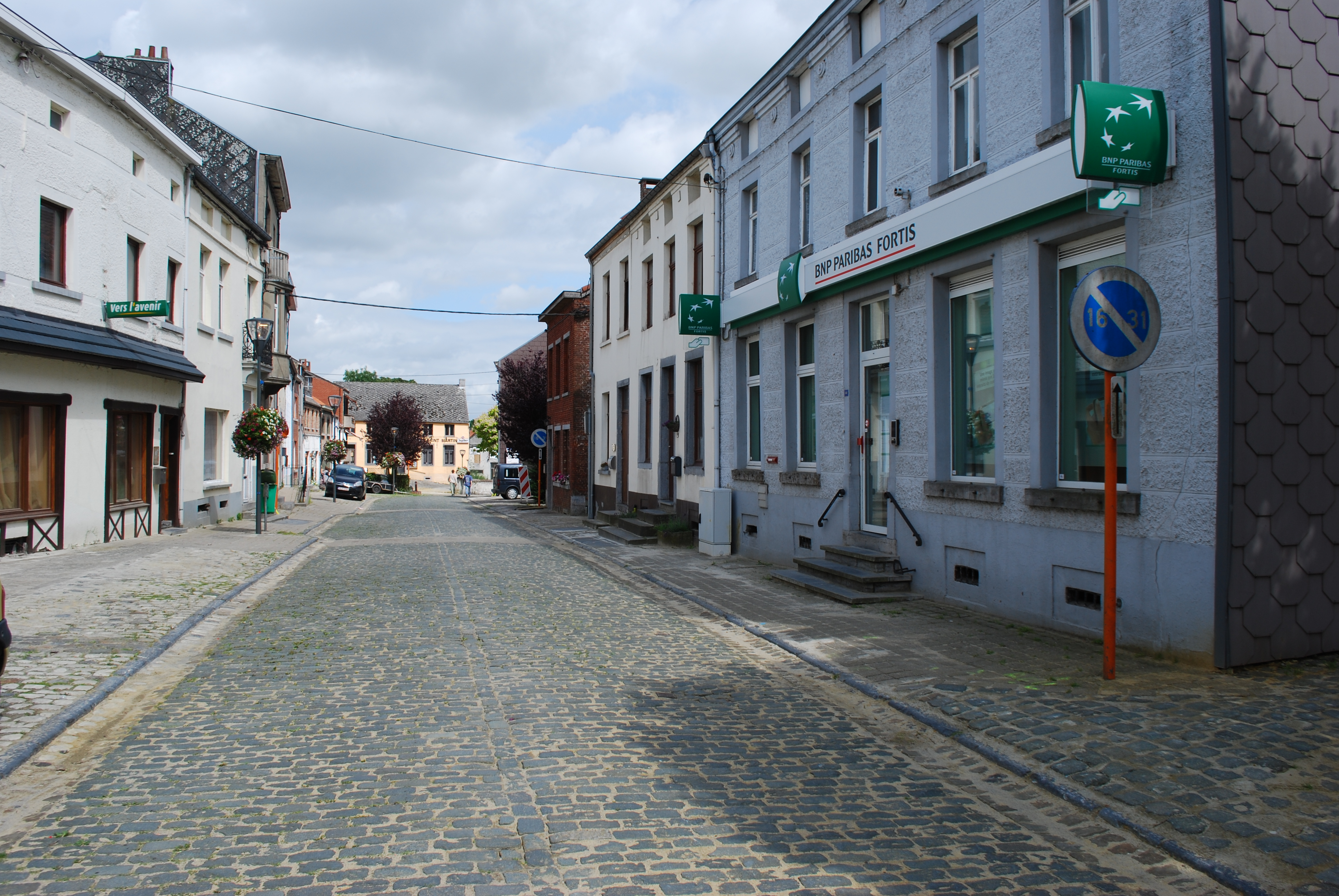
L'Avenir, at Villers-la-Ville

The collections of old Namur newspapers and magazines of the Société archéologique de Namur (Archaeological Society of Namur) covering the years from 1829 to 1981 were filed in 1999 in the Regional Archives Service of the Walloon Public Service at the Moulin de Meuse, Beez (Namur). A complete inventory was published in 2000.

== Other sources ==
- Marie-Louise Warnotte : Étude sur la presse à Namur 1794-1914, Paris, Louvain, Nauwelaerts, 1965, Cahiers du Centre inter-universitaire d'histoire contemporaine, issue 44.
- Marie-Louise Warnotte : L'Ami de l'Ordre, quotidien catholique namurois, de 1839 à 1914, Paris, Louvain, Nauwelaerts, 1968, Cahiers du Centre inter-universitaire d'histoire contemporaine, issue 51.
