= Rädda Barnen =

Swedish humanitarian organisation

Rädda Barnen (Save the Children Sweden) is the name of the Swedish section of the Save the Children International.

The Swedish section was founded on November 19, 1919, by Ellen Palmstierna (chairman) together with writer Elin Wägner and Gerda Marcus (both active board members). Anna Kleman was also a founding member of the board and she would go on to lead the board.

== See also ==
- Social Venture Network
- Timeline of young people's rights in the United Kingdom
