= Maria Raschke =

German lawyer (1850–1935)

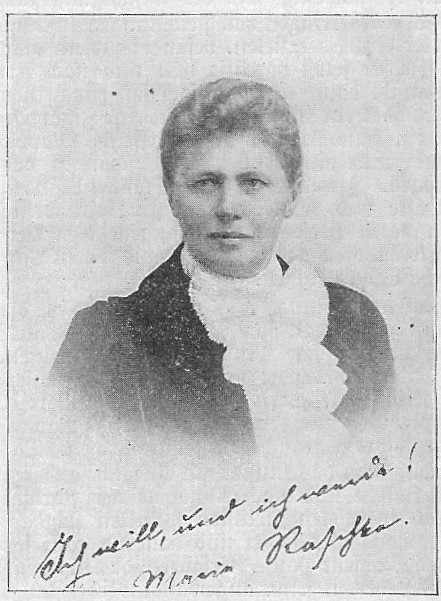
Raschke, Marie-ok

Marie Alwine Ottilie Raschke (29 January 1850 in Gaffert, Stolp County – 15 March 1935 in Berlin) was one of the leading lawyers in the German women's movement and also one of the first German women lawyers in general. Raschke was to fight against the standards created in the German society: women were not allowed to be actually involved in law by practice but they might pursue careers connected with law. Raschke was one of the first women who was a law student in Berlin in 1896 and the reason for her study was that state might be in need of teachers, who knew the law.
