= Lida Heymann =

German feminist, pacifist and women's rights activist

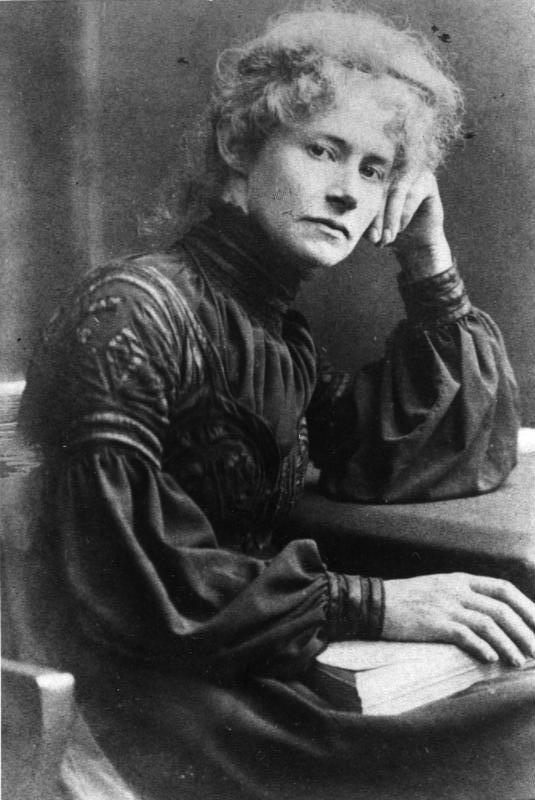
- Lida Gustava Heymann in 1900
- Born: Lida Gustava Heymann; 15 March 1868; Hamburg, North German Confederation
- Died: 13 July 1943 (aged 75); Zürich, Switzerland

Lida Gustava Heymann (15 March 1868 – 31 July 1943) was a German feminist, pacifist and women's rights activist.

Together with her partner Anita Augspurg she was one of the most prominent figures in the bourgeois women's movement. She was, among other things, in the forefront of the Verband Fortschrittlicher Frauenvereine ("Association of Women's Groups").

== Early life ==
Heymann was born in Hamburg to a wealthy coffee importer and his wife; she later used her family inheritance in a variety of humanitarian and philanthropic projects. Her father was Brazilian, but she became a naturalised German after his death.

== Career ==
During the 1890s, she started a small school to teach children and their parents.

She co-founded the abolitionist movement in Germany. (Note: "Abolitionist" in this context refers to abolition of prostitution. The German state allowed, and regulated, prostitution at the time.) In this role she came into conflict with the law as she protested about the treatment of prostitutes and called for the abolition of state regulation for them. Heymann wanted to "help women free themselves from male domination." With her vast inheritance she established a women's centre, offering meals, a crèche and counselling. She also founded a co-educational high school and professional associations for female clerks and theatre workers.

In 1902 she and Augspurg founded the first German Verein für Frauenstimmrecht ("Society for Women's Suffrage"). Together with Augspurg, she published the newspaper Frau im Staat ("Women in the State") from 1919 to 1933. This newspaper presented the pacifist, feminist and democratic positions on various subjects.

During WWI, Heymann published an appeal for women to speak out against the war (Women of Europe, When Will Your Call Ring Out?); she also attended the International Congress of Women at The Hague in 1915, which led to the founding of the International Committee of Women for Permanent Peace (ICWPP) (later named the Women's International League for Peace and Freedom (WILPF).

Heymann ran for the German National Assembly in 1919 as an independent, but did not receive enough votes; in 1923 she and Augspurg called for the Austrian Adolf Hitler to be expelled from Germany.

When Hitler seized power in 1933, both were out of the country; they did not return. Their property was confiscated and they settled in Switzerland. Heymann died in 1943 and was buried in Fluntern Cemetery.

== Legacy ==
Heymann and Augspurg co-wrote their memoires Erlebtes-Erschautes which were published in 1972.

In Hamburg, Heymannstraße street is named after her.

== Sources ==
- This article was abridged, adapted and translated from its counterpart on the German Wikipedia on 24 February 2011.
- Women, Peace and Transnational Activism, History and Policy (2015)
