= List of Dutch suffragists and suffragettes =

This is a list of Dutch suffragists and suffragettes who were born in the Netherlands or whose lives and works are closely associated with that country.

== Suffragists and suffragettes ==
- Josephine Baerveldt-Haver (1868–1945) – feminist and member of Vereeniging voor Vrouwenkiesrecht
- Mia Boissevain (1878–1959) – malacologist, feminist
- Jeltje de Bosch Kemper (1836–1916) – feminist
- Lizzy van Dorp (1872–1945) – lawyer, economist, politician, feminist
- Wilhelmina Drucker (1847–1925) – politician, writer
- P. van Heerdt tot Eversberg-Quarles van Ufford (1862–1939) – feminist, artist, and peace activist
- Mariane van Hogendorp (1834–1909) – feminist
- Mietje Hoitsema (1847–1934) – feminist
- Cornélie Huygens (1848–1902)
- Aletta Jacobs (1854–1929) – chairperson of Vereeniging voor Vrouwenkiesrecht, 1903–1919
- Martina Kramers (1863–1934) – feminist
- Rosa Manus (1881–1943) – pacifist
- Catharine van Tussenbroek (1852–1925) – physician, feminist
- Annette Versluys-Poelman (1853–1914) – chairperson of Vereeniging voor Vrouwenkiesrecht 1894–1902
- Clara Meijer-Wichmann (1885–1922) – lawyer, writer, anarcho-syndicalist, feminist, atheist
- Mien van Wulfften Palthe (1875–1960) – feminist and pacifist

== See also ==
- List of suffragists and suffragettes
- Timeline of women's suffrage
