= Feminism in the Netherlands =

In the Netherlands, feminism began as part of the first-wave feminism movement during the 19th century. Later, the struggles of second-wave feminism in the Netherlands mirrored developments in the women's rights movement in other Western countries. Women in the Netherlands still have an open discussion about how to improve remaining imbalances and injustices they face as women.

== History ==
=== Renaissance and Enlightenment ===
The Republic of the Seven United Provinces, known as the Netherlands, was created through the Dutch War of Independence, which began in 1568 and ended with the Treaty of Westphalia. Women had a limited number of rights, including the right to enter contracts and the right to control their own dowries. Though they were still legally subordinate to men, widows such as Volcxken Diericx, an Antwerp publisher, and Aletta Hannemans, a Haarlem brewer, were allowed to continue their husband's business. Girls had no right to an education, and before widowhood, women were not allowed to own property or to participate in government.

=== Early to Mid-19th century ===
Industrialization in the Netherlands brought jobs to both men and women. Labour unions began organizing by the mid-19th century. In 1841, Anna Barbara van Meerten-Schilperoort founded Hulpbetoon aan Eerlijke en Vlijtige Armoede, the first women's organization in the Netherlands. Middle-class women began to find paid employment, first in nursing. The first department store in the Netherlands opened in 1860, and women began finding jobs as retail clerks. Kindergartens, which had been pioneered in Germany, spread quickly in the Netherlands and needed a workforce of trained young women to staff them. To train young women to teach primary school, middle schools for girls were established in 1867. Young women with academic promise could petition for the right to be admitted to an all-male secondary school. Universities were closed to women until 1871, when Aletta Jacobs gained admittance to study medicine. She graduated as Europe's first modern woman physician. Jacobs also became prominent in the women's suffrage movement in the Netherlands. She opened the first women's birth control clinic in Amsterdam in 1882.

=== First-wave feminists ===
In the 1883 Dutch parliamentary elections, Aletta Jacobs petitioned for the right to vote, pointing out that she met all the legal criteria, but she was rejected from voting. This event triggered the women's suffrage movement in the Netherlands. The immediate result was an amendment to the voting rights of the Constitution in 1887, to specify "male" inhabitants of the Netherlands had the vote, adding another barrier to the women's suffrage.

In 1888, the Vrije Vrouwenvereeniging (Free Women's Movement, or VVV) was founded. This was soon followed in 1894 by the creation of a sub-group within the organization, the Vereeniging voor Vrouwenkiesrecht (Organization of Women's Suffrage).

Wilhelmina Drucker was less concerned about women winning emancipation—which she saw as easily attainable—than women winning equal opportunity in the workplace, a struggle she saw as facing much more resistance from men. Yet, where other feminists in the country pressed for labour laws addressing the specific needs of women workers, Drucker was opposed. In Drucker's view, "The state should not interfere with men or with women, nor invent a fictive competition between men and women. It should solely recognize people; members of society."

Drucker was firmly on the radical edge of feminism in the Netherlands, but she gave speaking tours and published a popular feminist journal, Evolutie (Evolution). In 1899, she spearheaded a campaign to stop legislation that would ban women under 40 from jobs as teachers or civil servants; after a decade-long campaign, the bill was "crushed". Aletta Jacobs co-founded the International Women's Suffrage Alliance in 1902.

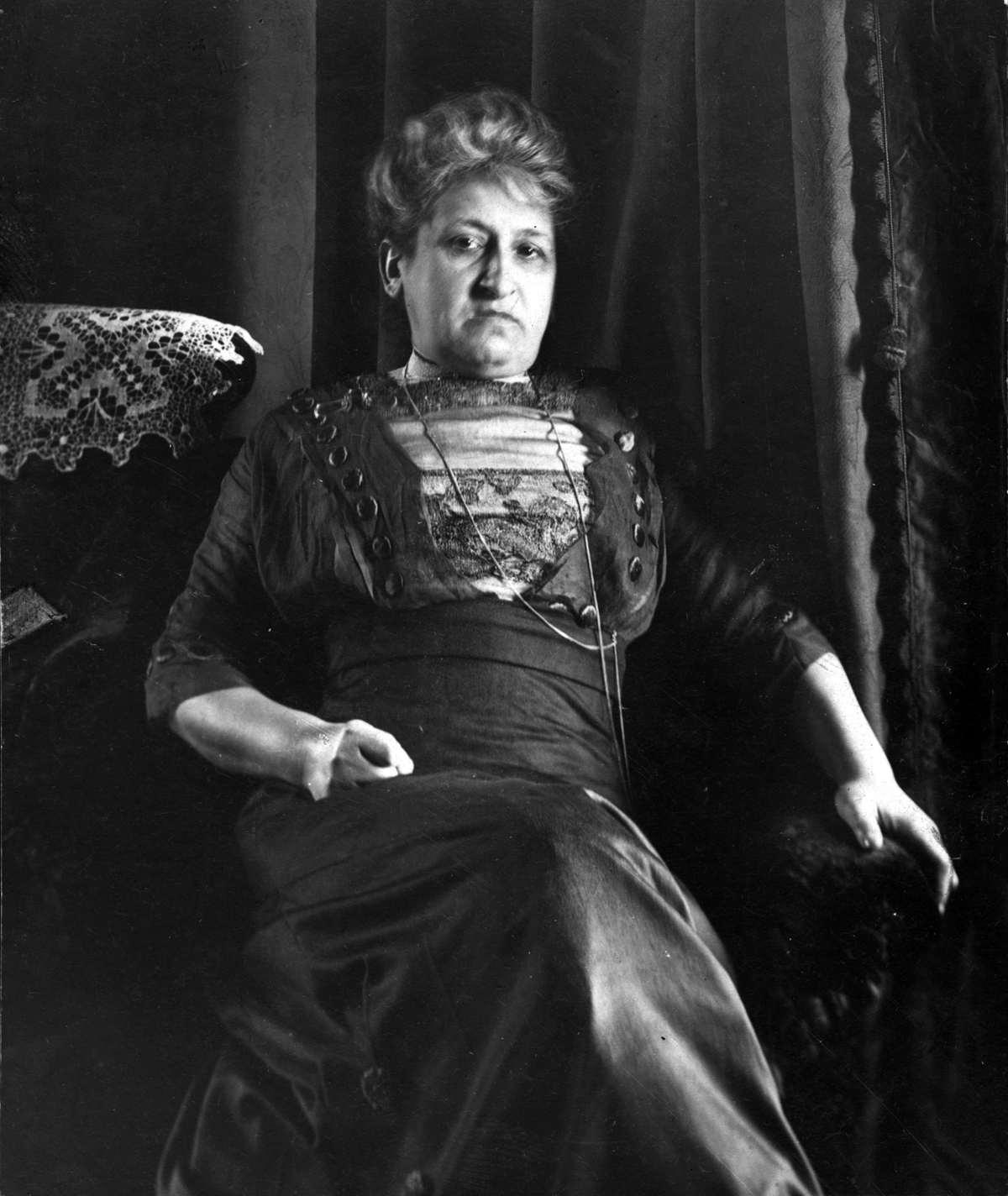
Aletta Jacobs, physician and suffragette.

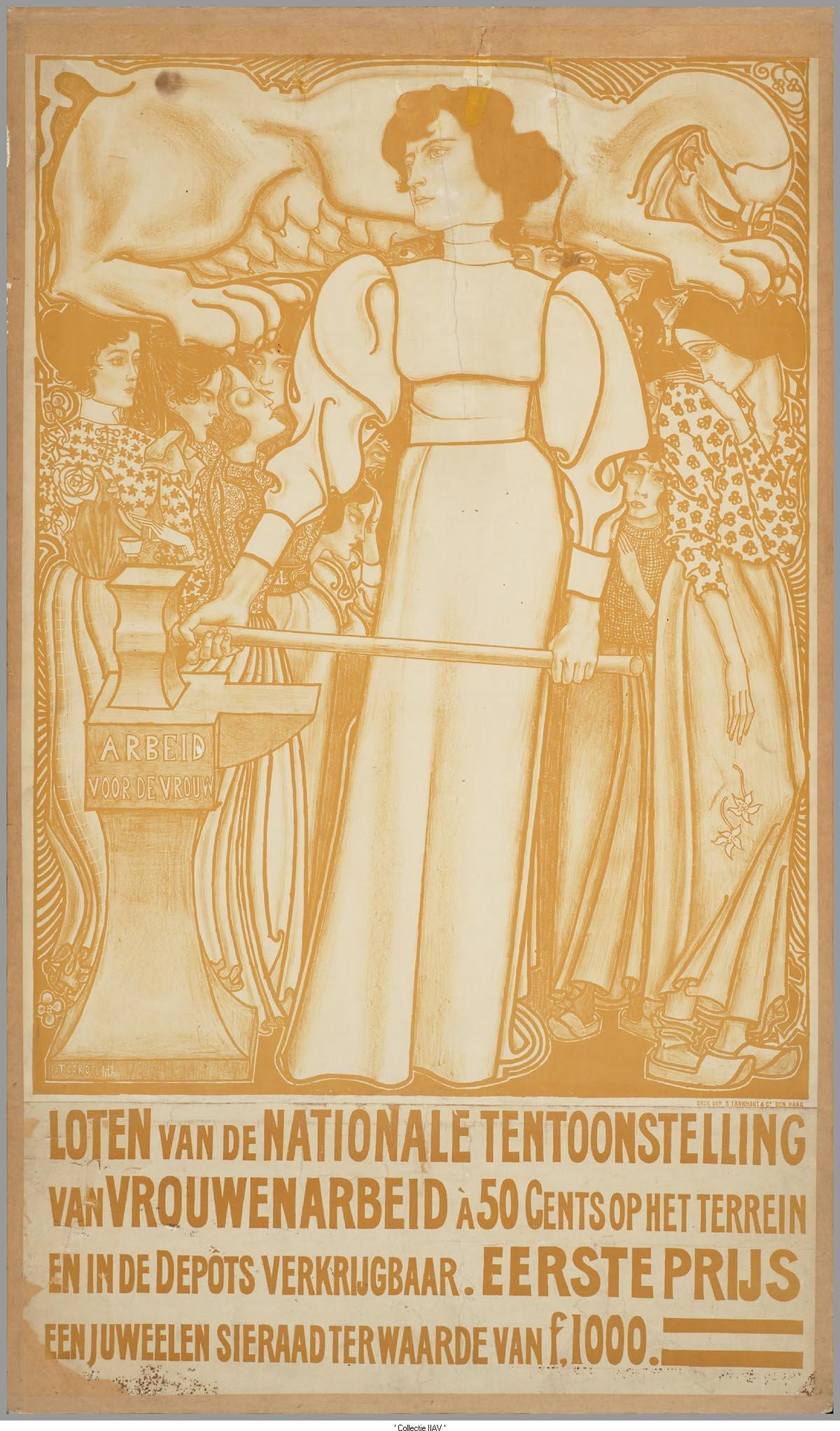
Poster advertising the Exhibition of Female Labour at the Hague, January 1, 1898.

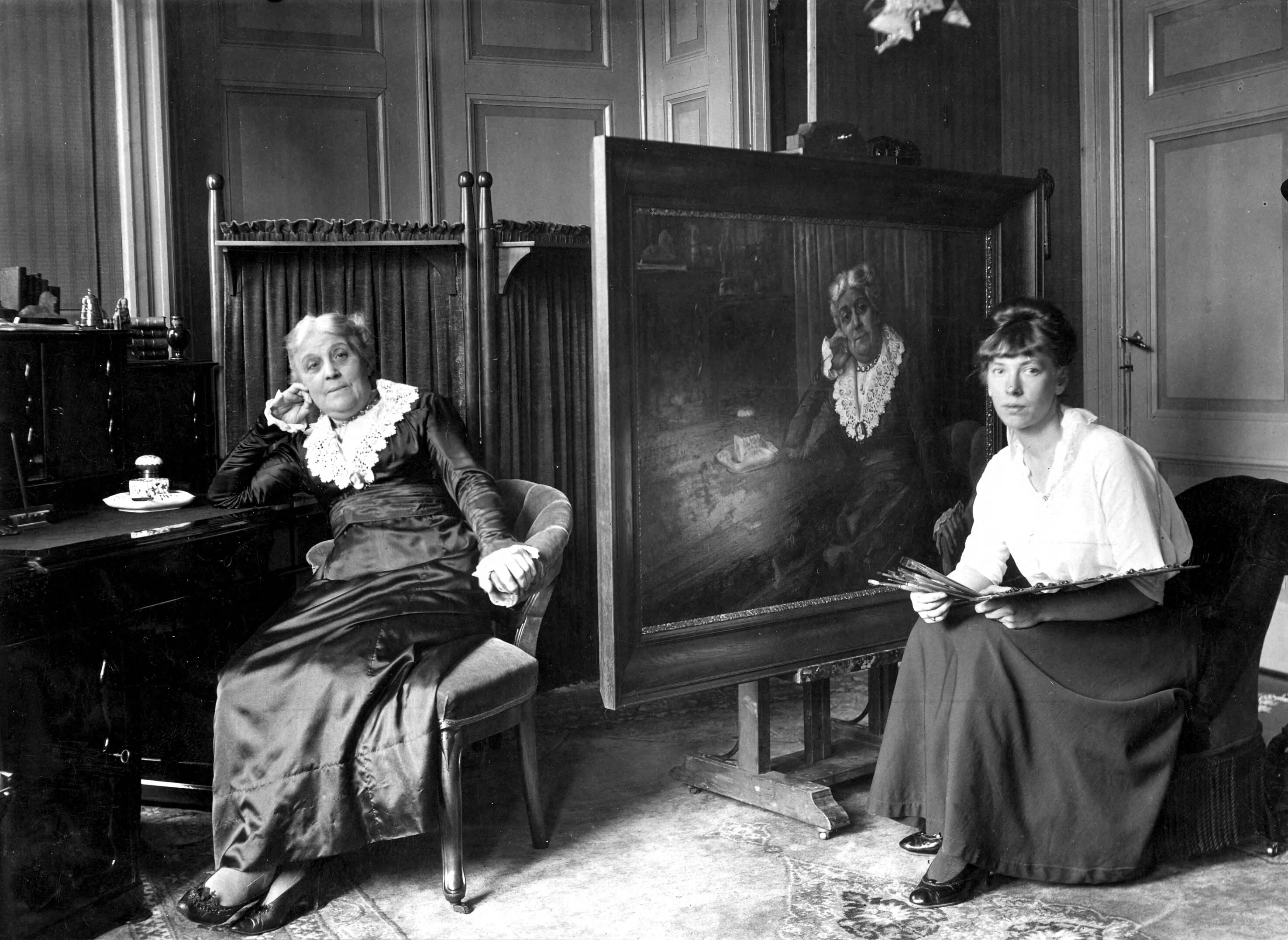
Wilhelmina Drucker sitting for her portrait for her seventieth birthday, 1917.

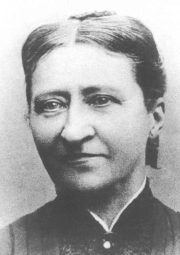
Helena Mercier, a social reformer and prolific writer on women's issues.

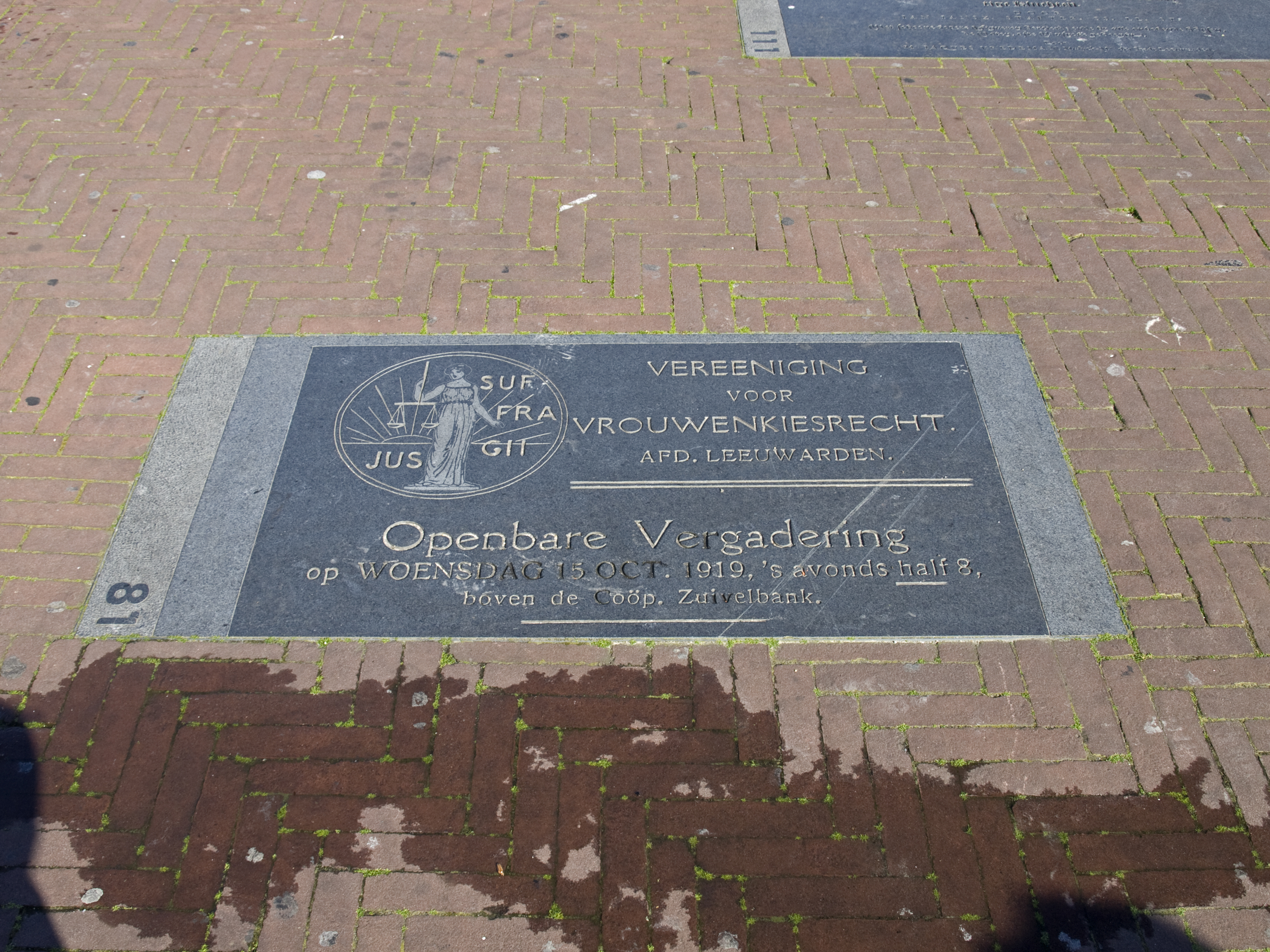
A plaque in Leeuwarden commemorating the meeting of the Vereeniging vor Vrouwenkiesrecht

=== 1917 to 1960 ===
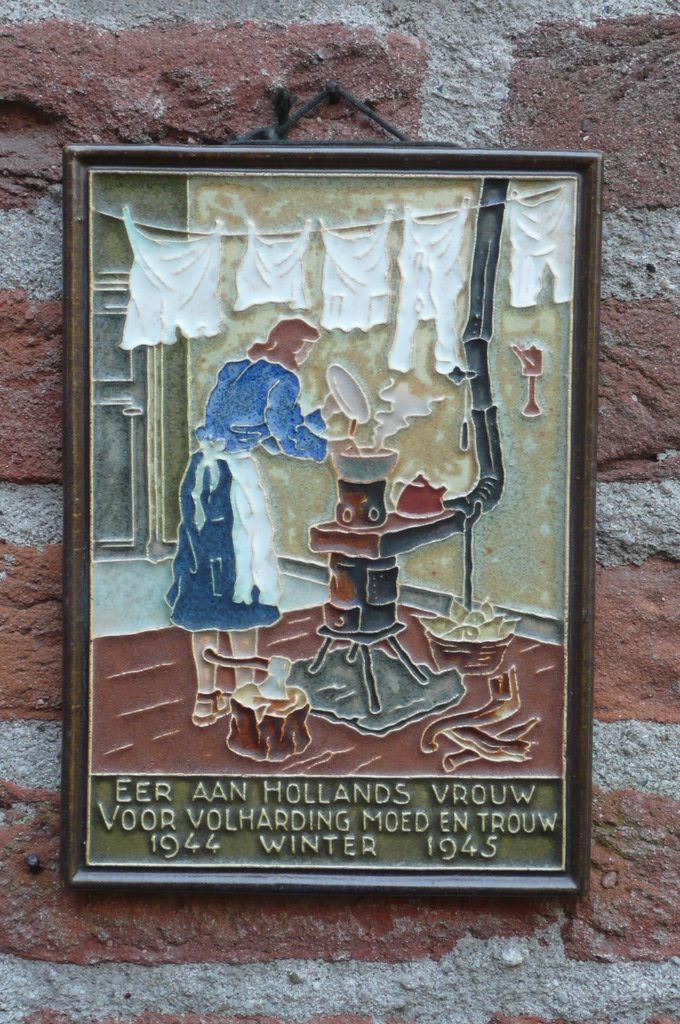
A plaque tribute to Dutch wives who persevered during the Hunger Winter of 1944–5.

Women won the right to stand for an election as a candidate in 1917. They gained full suffrage in 1919. This was relatively early compared to most other European nations; only Norway, Finland and Sweden had given women the vote earlier. Women had in part gained the vote to a political compromise "package deal" between socialists, liberals, and "confessionalist" parties. The confessionalists supported state funding for private schools, typically belonging to a religious denomination. This compromise system in Dutch politics was known as Pillarisation. In the years after women's emancipation, the confessionalists came to dominate moral discourse in the Netherlands, and legislation in support of confessionalist moral views was enacted (prostitution banned, 1912; abortion prohibited, 1911; advertising for contraception criminalized).

A healthy economy and a rising standard of living characterizes life in the Netherlands during the 1920s. Women, however, faced a backlash against women's rights which reached into the workplace. Women's rights groups multiplied. The international feminist organizations gained larger memberships as women worldwide continued to struggle for emancipation. Dutch women were active in such international organizations as:

- League of Nations;
- International Labour Organization;
- International Council of Women;
- IWSA/IAW, the International Women's Suffrage Alliance, after 1926 called the International Alliance of Women.

Women were praised for their resilience throughout the Hunger Winter of 1944-5 when food and fuel were blocked by the Nazi military. A period of conservatism followed for several years, but two notable legal milestones were achieved during the 1950s: in 1955, following a motion by feminist Corry Tendeloo, the law changed so that women could no longer be forced from civil service jobs after marrying, and in 1956, married women became legally competent. The marriage bar was removed in 1957.

=== Second-wave feminism ===
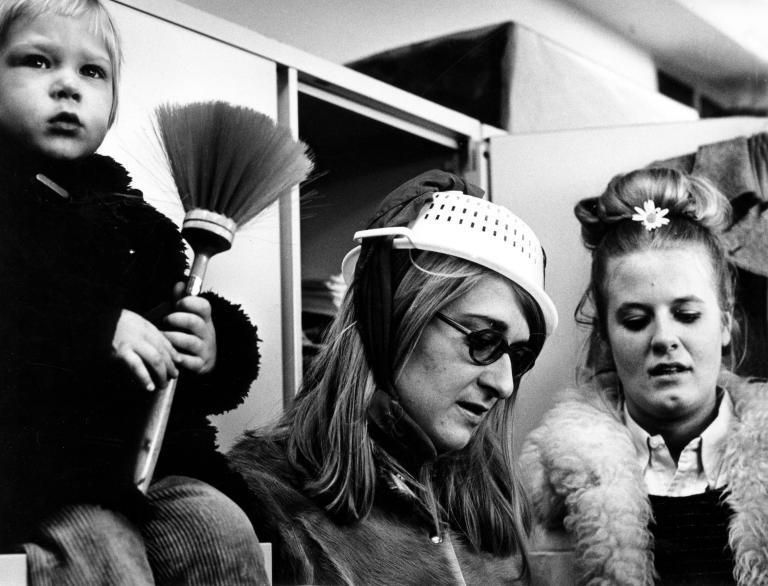
A costume demonstration by the feminist group Dolle Mina (Mad Mina), 1970.

A 1967 essay by Joke Kool-Smits, "The Discontent of Women", was published in De Gids and is credited with launching second-wave feminism in the Netherlands. The next year, a group of feminist men and women banded together to create the activist group Man-Vrouw-Maatschappij (Man-Woman society, or MVM). Its dual-gender composition made it rare among Western Second-wave feminist organizations, but it was similar to others in that its membership was predominantly middle or upper class and well-educated. Dissatisfied with the lobbying efforts of the MVM, a more radical group was inspired. The all-female Dolle Mina society was founded in 1969, naming itself "Mad Mina" after pioneering Dutch feminist Wilhelmina Drucker. Dolle Mina had success as a consciousness-raising force during the 1970s, mainly through its use of imaginative protests, such as an outdoor "Discrimination Fair" to draw attention to the issue of equal pay for equal work.

On 15 December 1969, the female employees of the cigar factory Champ Clark in Nieuwe Pekela called a wildcat strike to demand equal pay. They became the first women in the history of the Netherlands to go on strike.

The 1976 publication of Anja Meulenbelt's novel De Schaamte Voorbij (The Shame is Over) was another important piece of second-wave feminist writing in the Netherlands. The novel was confessional in tone, and made the connection between the body and language politics overt. In the late 1970s, the fight for access to abortion, rape crisis centres, and women's shelters became a dominant focus of the feminist movement.

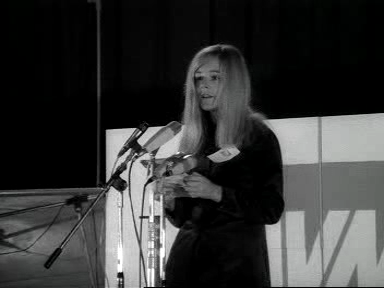
Prominent Dutch feminist Joke Smit giving a speech in 1972.

In 1980, the government was financially supporting 30 rape crisis centres in the Netherlands. During the 1970s, feminist periodicals multiplied, such as Dolle Mina, Vrouwen, Opzij, Serpentine, Vrouwenkrant, and Lover, and there were several feminist publishing houses in Amsterdam, the best known being De Bonte Was (1972) and Sara (1976). In 1982, an estimated 160 feminist groups were active in the Netherlands, covering 25% of Dutch towns. The 1980s saw many victories for the feminist movement, including the disintegration of the male breadwinner logic as the Netherlands began to prioritize re-gearing the welfare state in favor of incorporating women into the workforce. The Abortion Bill was passed in 1981, and came into force in 1984. In 1984 married women also obtained full legal equality in family law - prior to 1984 the law stipulated that the husband's opinion prevailed over the wife's regarding issues such as decisions on children's education and the domicile of the family. In 1985, Dutch women obtained the right to pass their nationality to their children. In 1991, the Netherlands removed the marital exemption form its rape law. In 2000, in a move which remains controversial, the Netherlands overhauled its legislation on prostitution, liberalizing the laws and legalizing regulated brothels (although prostitution in brothels had been de facto tolerated throughout the second part of the 20th century).

== Third-wave feminism ==
Despite having won many legal and social battles over the course of the 20th century, Dutch feminists are not ready to claim victory. Feminist activity continues in the Netherlands, and gender equality continues to be a topic of discussion in organizations, and in the media. Areas of concern remain the low participation of women in full-time employment and their low presence in top executive positions, violence against women, and discrimination against ethnic minority women.

From the 1970s onwards, the Netherlands has started promoting policies based on gender equality; and has once been described as having "the most extensive and comprehensive [sex equality apparatus] in Europe"; this is largely due to the appointment of a State Secretary to oversee an Emancipation Council launched in 1977, and its implementation of policies at the local level with help from feminist activists recruited into government positions. Women of colour have seen the need to create new organizations to advance gaps in meeting their needs: a Moroccan women's group was formed in 1992, and a Surinamese women's group was formed in 1996.

Despite the Netherlands having an image as progressive on gender issues, women in the Netherlands work less in paid employment than women in other comparable Western countries. In the early 1980s, the Commission of the European Communities report Women in the European Community found that "it is in the Netherlands (17.6%) and in Ireland (13.6%) that we see the smallest numbers of married women working and the least acceptance of this phenomenon by the general public". In the following years the numbers of women entering the workplace have increased, but with most of the women working part time.

Nearly 60% of Dutch working women aged 25-54 worked part-time in 2001, compared to 15% in the United States, 25% in France and 35% in Germany; but where 25% of French women working part-time say they want to work full-time, just 4% of Dutch women do.

Despite the government identifying this as a social problem in the 1990s, and introducing tax incentives to encourage women to find more paid employment, the opposite happened, and women found a way to use the tax incentives to reduce their working hours. In terms of balancing work and home life, parental leave is much more generous in Sweden, for example.

There is currently a great deal of debate in the Netherlands over whether women simply prefer to care for their children themselves and work reduced hours, or if higher costs are holding women back from seeking further employment. Economist, lawyer and journalist Heleen Mees wrote a book exploring the issue of women's low employment rate, called Weg met het deeltijdfeminisme (Away with Part-time Feminism) in 2005. She identified differences between Dutch and American culture that partially explain the discrepancy in working hours between women in the two nations. In her book, Mees discusses the American "marketization" of much of women's former household duties, such as using businesses for laundry, eating out, having groceries delivered, and other services, which are rarely available in the Netherlands. Childcare is the largest expense for two-income families in the Netherlands, and since it is customarily paid by the hour, this may provide an incentive for families to reduce childcare costs by having the mother do more child-minding and less paid employment.

According to The Economist, fewer men had to fight in the World Wars of the 20th century, and so Dutch women did not experience working for pay at rates women in other countries did. The wealth of the country, coupled with the fact that "[Dutch] politics was dominated by Christian values until the 1980s" meant that Dutch women were slower to enter into the workforce. In 2011, the Netherlands, together with Germany and Austria, were identified by the European Commission as countries with a poor integration of women in the workforce; Jose Manuel Barroso stated "Germany, but also Austria and the Netherlands, should look at the example of the northern countries." As of 2014, the Netherlands had the highest percentage of part-time women workers in the OECD.

There has been criticism that the Netherlands has constructed a policy focused on emphasizing the alleged difference between 'liberated' ethnic Dutch women and 'oppressed' immigrant women, creating a discriminatory dichotomy of "us vs. them". The CEDAW committee stated that "[t]he Committee remains concerned about the persistence of gender-role stereotypes, in particular about immigrant and migrant women and men, both of which are portrayed as being backward and having traditional views about women, denying their right to full development."

Violence against women remains a problem in the Netherlands: according to a 2014 study published by the European Union Agency for Fundamental Rights, the Netherlands had the fourth highest prevalence rate of physical and sexual violence against women in Europe, with 45% of women having experienced such violence, which is well above the European average of 33%. The Netherlands was condemned by the European Court of Human Rights in 1985 in the case of X and Y v. the Netherlands, for inadequate prosecution of sexual violence. In 2015, the Netherlands ratified the Council of Europe Convention on preventing and combating violence against women and domestic violence (Istanbul Convention).

An important (and controversial) contemporary activist is Ayaan Hirsi Ali, a Somali-born Dutch-American dual citizen activist, author, and politician. She is critical of female genital mutilation and Islam, and supportive of women's rights and atheism.

== See also ==
- List of Dutch suffragists and suffragettes
- Women in Europe
