= Titia van der Tuuk =

Dutch feminist and socialist

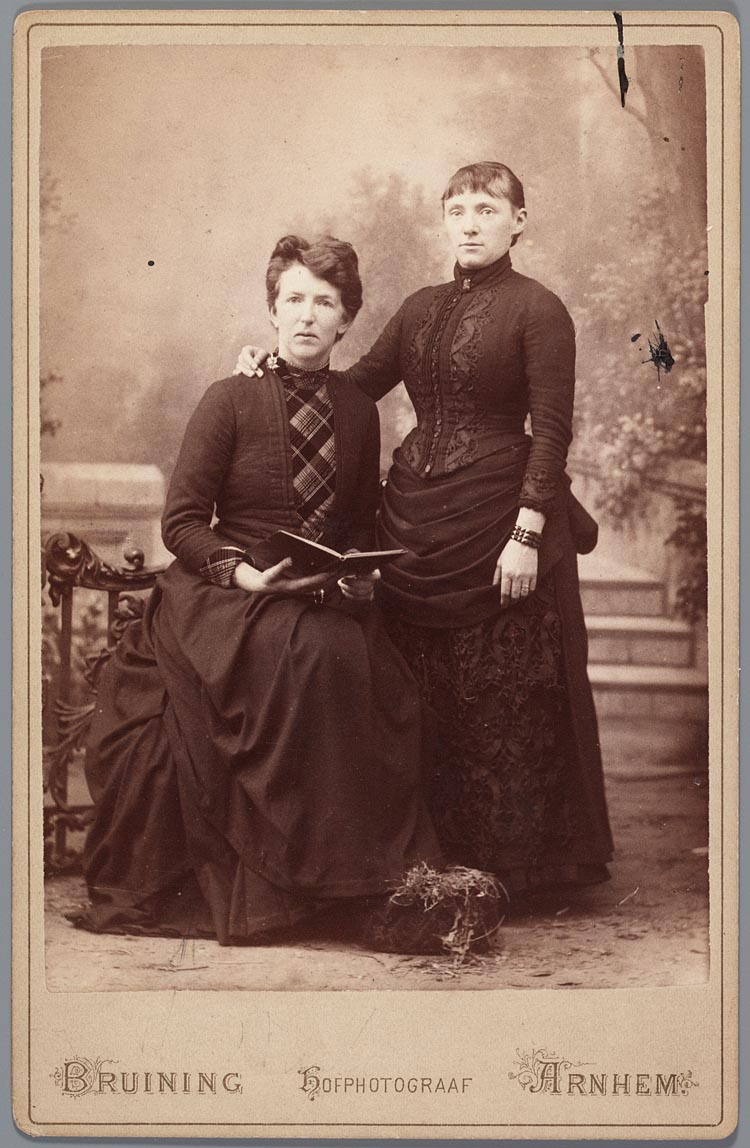
Van der Tuuk (left) and her partner Rosa Roosegaarde Bisschop, ca. 1885 (Bruining photographers, Arnhem)

Titia Klasina Elisabeth van der Tuuk (27 November 1854 – 7 May 1939), commonly known as Titia van der Tuuk, was a Dutch feminist and socialist. She was born in 't Zandt, Groningen to a preacher and a writer of children's literature. She initially worked as a teacher, but had to give up her profession due to deafness and hostility toward her because she was an avowed atheist. From 1885 onward, she started translating foreign literature into Dutch (such as Leo Tolstoy's War and Peace) and writing children's literature and historic novels. She was passionate in her activism for atheism, teetotalism, vegetarianism and pacifism. She often used the pseudonym Vitalis (adj. of vita, meaning life in Latin). She was never married and lived openly with her female partner. She died in Zeist, age 84.

== See also ==
- List of peace activists

== Publications ==
- Lieve Aleida in: De Tolk van den Vooruitgang, Derde en Vierde Bundel, 1878, 262-265;
- De noodzakelijkheid van 't socialisme' in: De Tolk van den Vooruitgang, Vijfde en Zesde Bundel (?), 1879, 177-182;
- Bijdrage tot oplossing der sociale kwestiën (Assen 1891);
- Een betere toekomst (Amsterdam 1897);
- Mensch of voorwerp? (Arnhem 1898);
- Het litteken van het dogma in: De Dageraad 1856-1906 (Amsterdam 1906) 232-236;
- De vrouw in haar seksueele leven. Een physiologisch-maatschappelijke studie met geneeskundige en hygiënische wenken (Almelo 1915);
- M. Cohen Tervaert-Israëls, dr. J. Rutgers, G. Kaptein-Muysken, Wilhelmina Drucker, Ch. Carno-Barlen, Est. H. Hartsholt-Zeehandelaar, Titia van der Tuuk, Martina G. Kramers, C. C. A. De Bruine-Van Dorp, Lodewijk van Mierop, Mr. S. Van Houten, J. C. De Bruijne - Moederschap: sexueele ethiek (Brochure uitgegeven door het Nationaal Comité voor Moederbescherming en Sexueele Hervorming)
- Twee geschiedenissen van vrede in: Gedenkboek ter gelegenheid van den 70sten verjaardag van F. Domela Nieuwenhuis (Amsterdam 1916) 139-142.
