= Roosje Vos =

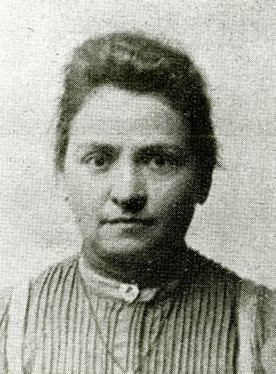
- Born: 15 August 1860; Amsterdam, The Netherlands
- Died: 22 July 1932 (aged 71); Groningen, The Netherlands
- Other name: Roosje Stel-Vos
- Occupations: trade unionist, women's rights activist, socialist
- Years active: 1884-1932
- Known for: establishing the first women's trade union in the Netherlands

Roosje Vos (15 August 1860 – 22 July 1932) was a Dutch seamstress who became an activist in the push for labor protections of working women. Founding trade unions and editing journals, she advocated for suffrage, women's economic independence and an eight-hour work day. An active member of the socialist party and later the communist party, she ran for election to the Groningen Provincial Council and served from 1919 to 1927.

== Early life ==
Roosje Vos was born on 15 August 1860 in Amsterdam, the Netherlands as the fifth child of Schoontje Jacob Fransman, proprietor of a boarding house and the cobbler, Jacob Marcus Vos. Vos was six years old when her father died and her mother struggled to support the family. Vos was sent to the Jewish Girls' Orphanage on Rapenburg Street at the age of fourteen, where she remained for nine years, learning to be a seamstress.

== Career ==
In 1884, when she left the orphanage, Vos began to work independently for clients, sewing dresses, undergarments and doing mending. She lived with two of her sisters in Amsterdam. Within ten years, competition from manufacturers forced many self-employed women to join factories involved in creating ready-to-wear goods and Vos joined a workshop. Poor working conditions, low pay and long hours, prompted Vos to form the first women's trade union with other dressmakers in 1897, All One (Dutch: Allen Een). Specifically, their actions were prompted by several women being replaced when they protested a pay cut and after attending a meeting of the Free Women's Association, where Wilhelmina Drucker urged that women begin their own trade unions. Vos was elected as president of the new organization and wrote articles under the pseudonym "Erve" for their journal, Seamstress's Messenger (Dutch: De Naaistersbode). Vos' union activities were well-known and she was terminated from various employment on that basis.

In 1898, when the National Exhibition of Women's Labour was organized, Vos was a participant at the event, held in The Hague, giving at least two speeches. She also organized an exhibit which displayed various garments, the amount workers were paid for creating the pieces and the number of hours they had to work to make them. At the conference, feminists and socialists of the newly formed Social Democratic Workers' Party (SDAP) clashed on whether class struggle was more important than equality for all. From the socialist standpoint, upper and middle-class women were not suited for work outside the home, and their attempts to lure working-class women into their ranks, were diverting working women from the true purpose of class struggle. Vos disputed the claims, writing an editorial, which the socialist organ De Sociaaldemokraat refused to publish, but which was published in Het Volksdagblad. Vos expressed that the characterization of women workers by socialists failed to address the reality that they must earn a living and that classes could work together to improve conditions.

Vos was elected to the Chamber of Labour of Amsterdam in 1899, but was not admitted as at the time she was self-employed. The following year, along with Sani Prijes, she formed the Cooperating Linen-Sewers Union, to assist laid-off seamstresses in earning a living. She also spoke at a national meeting held at The Hague, regarding workplace accidents. Despite her differences with the SDAP, Vos began participating in the party and by 1901, was part of the party congress which called for women's suffrage and an eight-hour work day. That same year she also broke with her previous stance that women needed their own unions, when she became president of the merged union for dressmakers and tailors. In 1902, she became editor of the combined union journal The Seamstress's and Tailor's Messenger (Dutch: Naaistersen Kleermakersbode).

In 1903, Vos took part on the national Defense Committee during the strike and then married a non-Jewish teacher, who she had met in the socialist movement, Melle Gerbens Stel. She left Amsterdam and moved to Westeremden in the Groningen province. The relocation forced her to give up editing and active involvement in the unions, but Stel-Vos remained active in the socialist and labor movement, in part because her sister-in-law took over the normal household duties of a wife. She also was a driving force in the development of the northern suffrage movement. In 1909, Stel-Vos left the SDAP and joined the newly formed Social-Democratic Party (SDP) and by 1918, ran for a seat on the Provincial Council of Groningen. Elected in 1919, Stel-Vos held her seat until 1927, the year of her husband's death. She remained active in women's causes. A week before her death, Stel-Vos spoke at a women's conference in opposition to war.

== Death and legacy ==
Stel-Vos died on 22 July 1932 in Groningen and was buried in the communal cemetery of the town. Many streets throughout the country bear her name, as does a school in Appingedam. In 2004, a children's book by Els Launspach, Verboden vriendschap (Forbidden friendship), about Vos' involvement in the seamstress union, was published.
