= Mietje =

Mietje is a feminine given name or nickname which may refer to:

- Mietje Marie Baron (1908–1948), Dutch swimmer and diver
- Maria Mietje Hoitsema (1847–1934), Dutch feminist
- Mietje, pen name of Maria Aletta Hulshoff (1781–1846), Dutch Patriot, feminist and pamphleteer
