= Martina Kramers =

Dutch Esperantist (1863-1934)

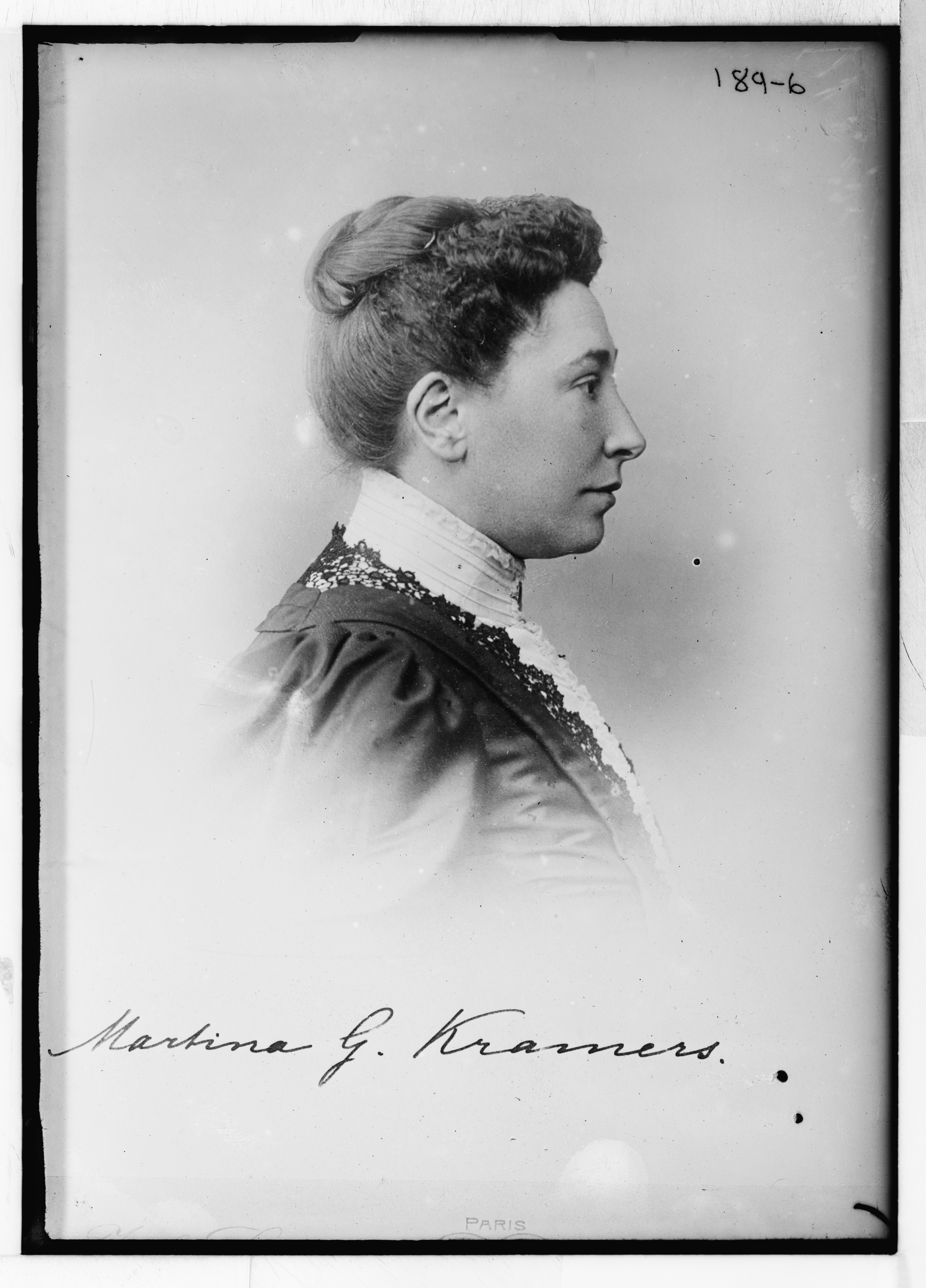
- Born: 6 June 1863; Veur, Netherlands
- Died: 15 October 1934 (aged 71); Apeldoorn, Netherlands
- Occupation: Suffragist

Martina Kramers (1863-1934) was a Dutch suffragist who was a leader in the International Council of Women and the International Woman Suffrage Alliance as well as in the national feminist movement in the Netherlands. In her various roles, Kramers was an active speaker, writer, and conference organizer for the causes she supported.

== Early life ==
Martina Gezina Kramers was born in Veur on 6 June 1863. Her father was the head of a Protestant boarding school, and as a result of growing up in an educational environment Kramers learned several languages as a child. Kramers' mother died in 1874. At 15, Kramers began studying at a teacher training school in Arnhem. After completing the program, she returned to Rotterdam where she continued to live with her family.

== Suffragist and social movement activity ==
Kramers' involvement with the women's rights movement in the Netherlands began when she joined the Vereeniging voor Vrouwenkiesrecht in 1894. Together with Marie Rutgers-Hoitsema, she founded the Society for the Advancement of Women's Interests in 1895. Kramers translated Frances Swiney's book The awakening of women, or, Woman's part in evolution into Dutch.

In 1898, Kramers helped organize the large, public National Exhibition on Women's Labor held in The Hague. In the same year, Kramers successfully advocated for the creation of the Dutch National Council for Women, inspired by a lecture given by May Wright Sewall at the exhibition. From 1899 to 1909, Kramers was a member of the board of the International Council of Women. She held the position of secretary at the International Woman Suffrage Alliance (IWSA) from 1906 to 1911 and was the first editor of the organization's journal, Jus Suffragii, from 1904 to 1913. She held several lectures as a representative of the IWSA at the Université nouvelle in Belgium that sparked the creation of the Belgian Federation for Women's Suffrage in 1913.

Kramers became a member of the Social Democratic Workers' Party in 1911. In 1913, Kramers was asked by IWSA president Carrie Chapman Catt to give up her position as the journal's editor due to her perceived socialist politics and her controversial relationship with a married man.

In addition to her suffragist work, Kramers was also active in the Dutch Neo-Malthusian movement, promoting the use of and public education about birth control. In 1910, Kramers took minutes, translated conference documents, and acted as interpreter at the Dutch Neo-Malthusian League's conference held in The Hague, attended by activists and political leaders including Samuel van Houten, Aletta Jacobs, and Alice Vickery. Several of her letters and articles were published in the Margaret Sanger-led Birth Control Review.

== Later life ==
In 1918, Kramers moved to Apeldoorn and shifted her focus to social democratic politics. In 1923, Kramers was elected to the Apeldoorn city council. Kramers, who in her life was also an Esperantist, gave lessons in the language to interested young people.

Kramers died in Apeldoorn on 15 October 1934.
