= Mariane van Hogendorp =

Dutch suffragist

Jonkvrouw Mariane van Hogendorp
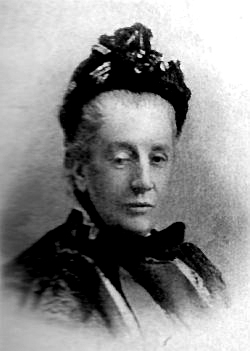
- Born: 8 August 1834; The Hague, Netherlands
- Died: 17 September 1909 (aged 75); Lausanne, Switzerland
- Occupation: Social reformer
- Spouse: Aarnout Klerck (m. 1875; died in 1876)

Jkvr. Mariane Catherine van Hogendorp (August 8, 1834 – September 17, 1909), a member of the Van Hogendorp family, was a Dutch feminist. She founded the Nederlandsche Vrouwenbond ter Verhooging van het Zedelijk Bewustzijn (Dutch Women's Union to Increase Moral Consciousness).

== Life ==
Hogendorp was born on 8 August 1834 in The Hague. She married Aarnout Klerck in 1875 ending with his death in 1876.

Hogendorp was the founder of the Nederlandsche Vrouwenbond ter Verhooging van het Zedelijk Bewustzijn (NPV), an influential women's organisation which worked for against the Regulation System of prostitution, which she managed alongside her sister Anna van Hogendorp in 1883–1909. She also worked on issues surrounding prostitution with the English feminist Josephine Butler.

Hogendorp was a member of the Vereeniging voor Vrouwenkiesrecht from 1894 to 1909, and the representative of the Netherlands in the international women's movement in 1900. She was president of the Vrienden der Armen Association from 1874 to 1900.

She died in Lausanne, Switzerland on September 17, 1909.
