= Josephine Baerveldt-Haver =

Dutch women's suffrage activist (1868–1945)

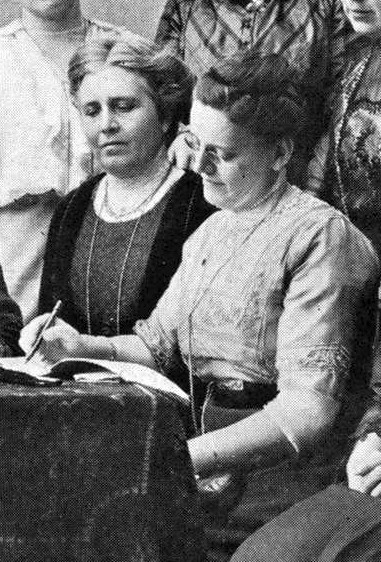
- Born: Josephine Sare Rosine Haver; 23 February 1868; Amsterdam, The Netherlands
- Died: 20 or 22 June 1945; Tjideng internment camp, Batavia, Dutch East Indies
- Burial place: Ereveld Menteng Pulo, Jakarta
- Organization: Vereeniging voor Vrouwenkiesrecht

Josephine Sare Rosine Baerveldt-Haver (23 February 1868 – 20 or 22 June 1945) was a Dutch women's suffrage activist.

== Biography ==
Baerveldt-Haver was born in Amsterdam. Her sister was the Dutch feminist and journalist Theodora "Dora" Petronelle Bernardine Haver. She married Jacques Baerveldt.

Baerveldt-Haver joined the Dutch Vereeniging voor Vrouwenkiesrecht (VVK, Association for Women's Suffrage) in 1903. She became the chair of the Amsterdam branch. In 1916, she co-founded her own women's suffrage association.

Baerveldt-Haver died on 20 or 22 June 1945 in the Japanese-run internment camp for women and children, Tjideng in Batavia, Dutch East Indies. She was reburied at the Ereveld Menteng Pulo in Jakarta, also known as the Jakarta Dutch Field Of Honor.
