= Van Hogendorp =

Dutch noble family

van Hogendorp
- noble family
- Country: Netherlands
- Founded: 16th century
- Founder: Gijsbrecht Gillisz van Hogendorp
- Titles: baron, count, jonkheer

Van Hogendorp is a patrician family that belongs to the Dutch nobility.

== History ==
The first recorded member is the Gijsbert Gillisz. van Hogendorp who died in The Hague in 1584 and worked as a councillor for the High Council of Holland. During the 17th and 18th century the family played a role in the government of Rotterdam.

The possessions of the Van Hogendorp family include the partly free lordships of Moerkapelle, Wilde Veenen, Sint-Jan ten Steen, Glossenberghe, Hofwegen, Steenhuysen, Cromstrijen and Heijningen. In 1748 Gijsbert van Hogendorp was granted the title of Reichsgrave by emperor Francis I. In 1811, emperor Napoleon gave Dirk van Hogendorp the title of Comte de l'Empire. In 1814, Gijsbert Karel van Hogendorp was appointed to the ridderschap (thus de facto recognized into the nobility) and in 1815 granted the title Count of the Kingdom of the Netherlands, with inheritance of the title to the legal, eldest son. In 1867, his younger son Frederik van Hogendorp was granted the title Baron of the Kingdom of the Netherlands, with inheritance of the title to the legal eldest son. This was converted into inheritance of the baronial title on all in 1868. Untitled noble members of other branches of the family still bear the predicate Jonkheer.

== Notable members ==
- Gijsbert Karel van Hogendorp (1762-1834), politician.
- Dirk van Hogendorp (1761-1822)
- Dirk van Hogendorp (1797-1845)
- Mariane van Hogendorp (1834-1909), feminist and suffrage activist.

== Bibliography ==
- Nederland's Adelsboek 85 (1995), pp. 310-359.
