= Anette Poelman =

Dutch suffragist

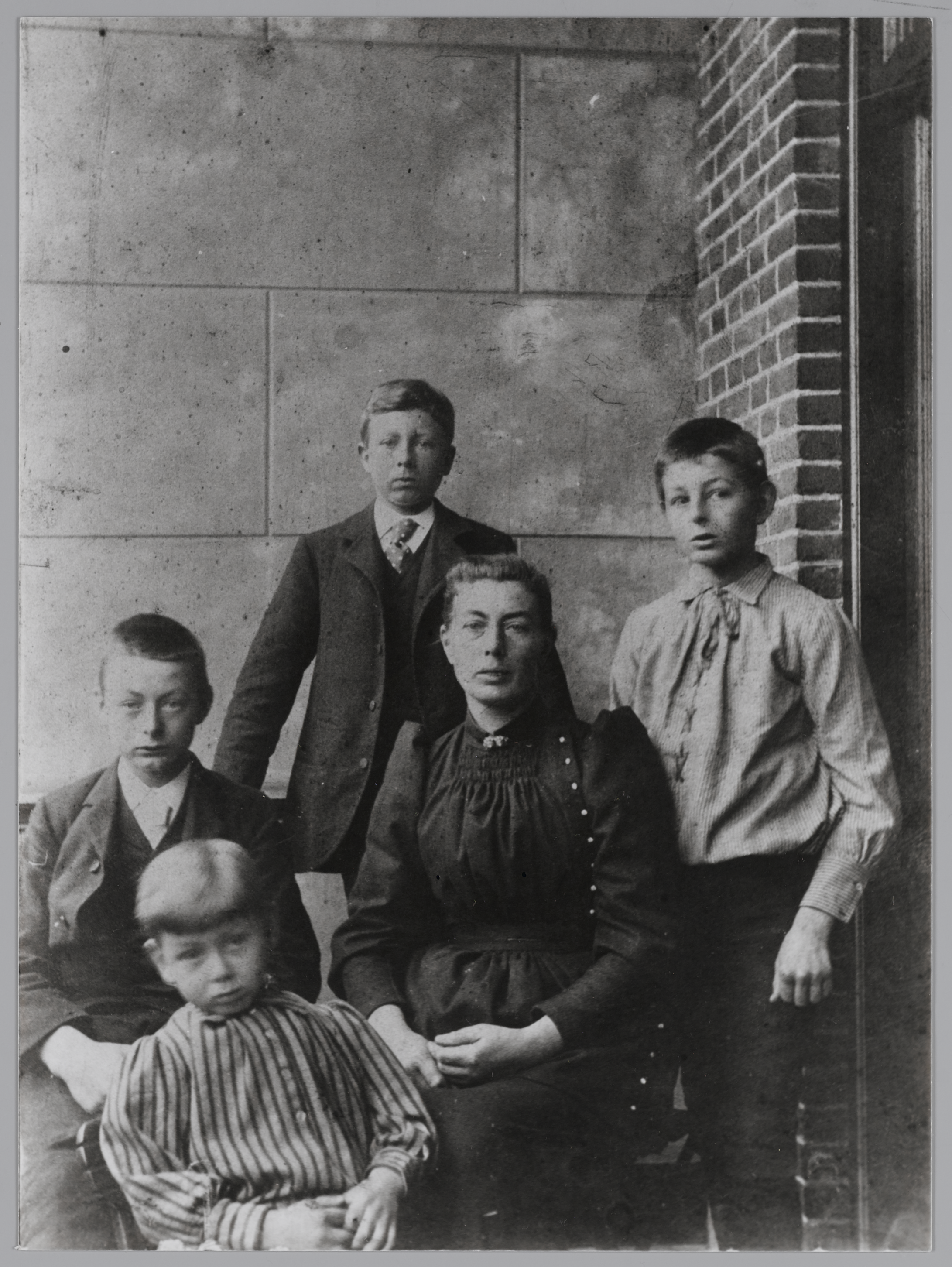
- Born: 8 June 1853; Holwierde, The Netherlands
- Died: 10 February 1914 (aged 60); Amsterdam, The Netherlands

Anette Wiea Luka Poelman (8 June 1853, Holwierde - 10 February 1914, Amsterdam) was a Dutch suffragist and philanthropist. She co-founded the first Woman Suffrage association in the Netherlands, FRP, in 1894 and served as its chairperson in 1894-95 and 1895-1903. She also founded the organisation OV, for the support of unmarried mothers and illegitimate children and the reform of marriage law in 1897, which she chaired in 1901-1904, and was the co-founder of a liberal party in 1901.

Anette Poelman was the daughter of the radical preacher and parliamentarian Adrian Louis Poelman and Catherine Reijnder and, from 1876, married to the publisher William Versluys (1851-1937), whose company was known for its publication of radical writers. In 1893, the women's rights association of Wilhelmina Drucker called for the foundation of a woman suffrage association, and the following year, Poelman was one of four co-founders of the FRP and became its chairperson. In 1905-1914, she managed a home for unmarried mothers.
