= Anna Barbara van Meerten-Schilperoort =

Dutch writer, editor

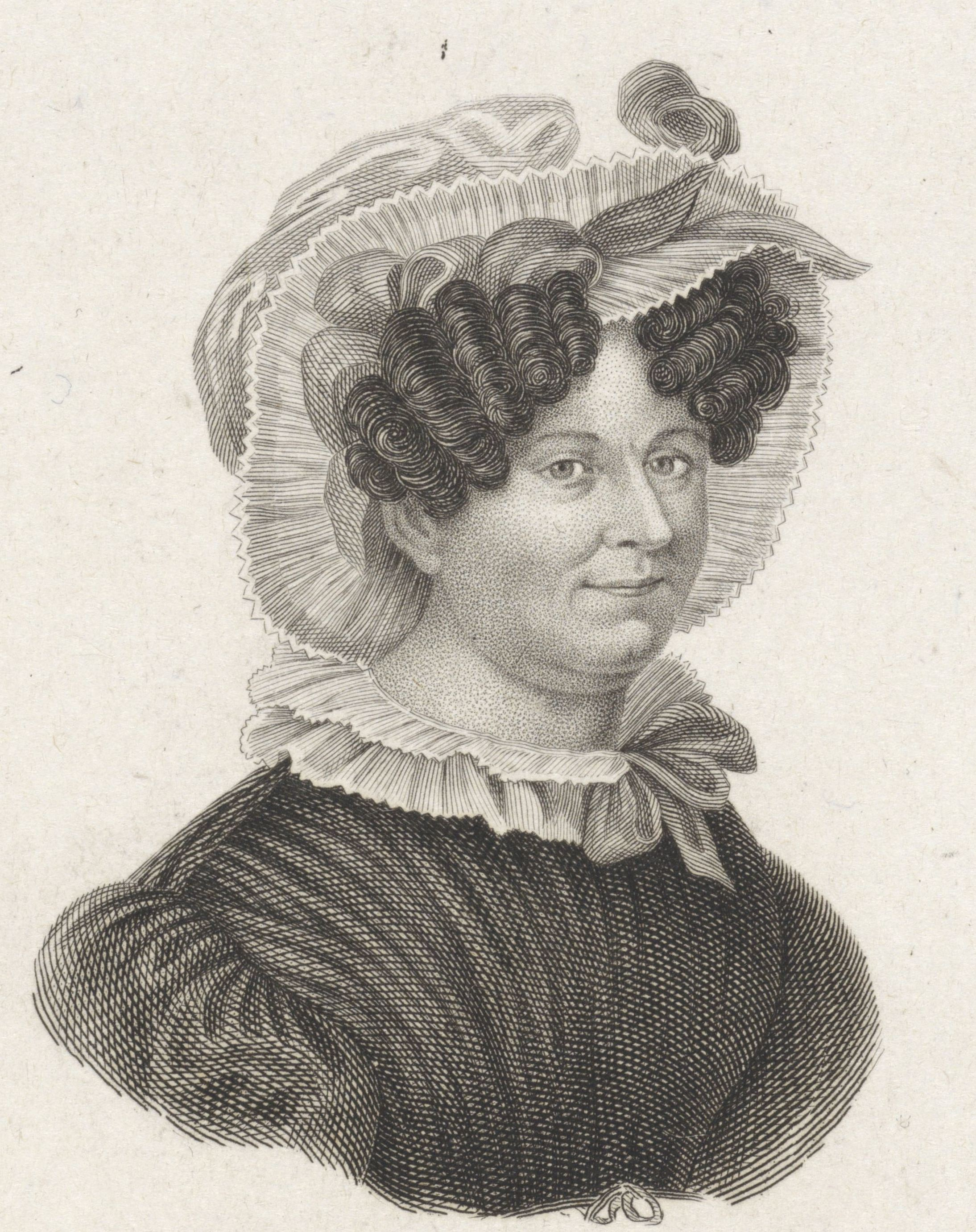
Portrait of Anna Barbara van Meerten-Schilperoort by Philippus Velijn (between 1833 and 1836).

Anna Barbara van Meerten-Schilperoort (3 January 1778, Geestbrug – 14 February 1853, Gouda), was a Dutch women's rights activist.

== Early life ==
She came from a burgher family, and married the vicar Hendrik van Meerten (ca 1760–1830) in 1794. She was given an education in a finishing school, which was described as shallow, as was the custom for education offered in the schools for girls at that time.

== Career ==
Because of the poverty of the family caused by the French invasion in 1795, she started to give private lessons to contribute to the income of the family. She eventually opened a small girls' school. In 1815, her spouse was appointed school inspector, and through him, she introduced a petition of training courses for teachers in 1816, which was, however, not accepted. She also published several books on education, advice to women, novels, and other works. In 1821–1835, she was the editor of the paper Penelope. Her school became one of the most notable institutes of education for women in the Netherlands. She spoke for difference feminism, and argued that women should be given a more public role in the service of the state.

In 1832 she started philanthropic work for the betterment of the conditions of female prisoners, and in 1841, she founded the charity association Hulpbetoon aan Eerlijke en Vlijtige Armoede, which was the first women's organization in the Netherlands.

She has been referred to as the founder of the organized women's rights movement in the Netherlands.

There are four streets in The Netherlands named after her. In Amsterdam, Leiden and Zaandam there is a Barbara van Meerten Street. Gouda, the city where she died, has an Anna van Meerten Street.
