= Mietje Hoitsema =

Dutch feminist (1847–1934)

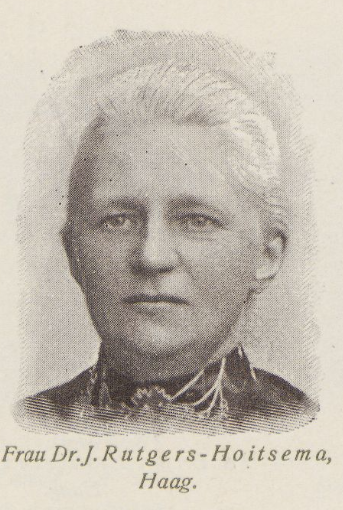
- Mietje Rutgers-Hoitsema at the International Congress of Women, Berlin, 1904
- Born: Maria Wilhelmina Hendrika Hoitsema; 10 July 1847; Britsum, The Netherlands
- Died: 25 October 1934 (aged 87); Rijswijk, The Netherlands
- Occupation: Suffragist
- Spouse: Johannes Rutgers (m. 1885, died in)

Maria Wilhelmina Hendrika "Mietje" Hoitsema (1847–1934) was a Dutch feminist.

== Personal life ==
Mietje Hoitsema was born on 10 July 1847 in Britsum. She was the daughter of the theologian Synco Hoitsema (1799–1860) and Rika van Bolhuis (1808–1895) and married the doctor Johannes Rutgers (1850–1924) in 1885. She became a teacher in 1865 and was the principal of a girls' school from 1873-1885. She was injured in a car accident in 1913 and withdrew from public life in 1918.

Hoitsema died on October 25, 1934, in Rijswijk.

== Career ==
In 1894 Mietje Hoitsema became chairperson of the local Rotterdam branch of the Dutch women suffrage union (Vereeniging voor Vrouwenkiesrecht). She founded an association to support the rights of women, children and working families (1895) and an association for the support of unmarried mothers (1898) and an association for the rights of professional women (1903). She was also a member of the Malthusian League, which fought for the rights for sex education and birth control.

Hoitsema joined the Sociaal Democratische Arbeiders Partij (SDAP) (Social Democratic Workers' Party) at the turn of the century. She left the SDAP in 1905 as the party prioritized elimination of class difference over gender differences as well as the SDAP's abandonment of advocacy of women's voting rights.

== See also ==
- List of suffragists and suffragettes
