= Vrije Vrouwen Vereeniging =

Dutch women's rights organisation

The Vrije Vrouwen Vereeniging (Free Women's Association) was a women's rights organisation active in the Netherlands from 1889. It was one of the leading women's nationwide organizations of the 19th-century Dutch women's movement. Its purpose was to work for the equality for men and women within education, profession, law and in politics, and it thereby also worked for women's suffrage, though this was not their main target.

The organisation was co-founded by Wilhelmina Drucker. One of its most famous actions, which has also been referred to as the highlight of the women's movement in the Netherlands in the 19th century, was the National Exhibition of Women's Labour at the Hague in 1898.
