= Wilhelmina Drucker =

Dutch politician and writer

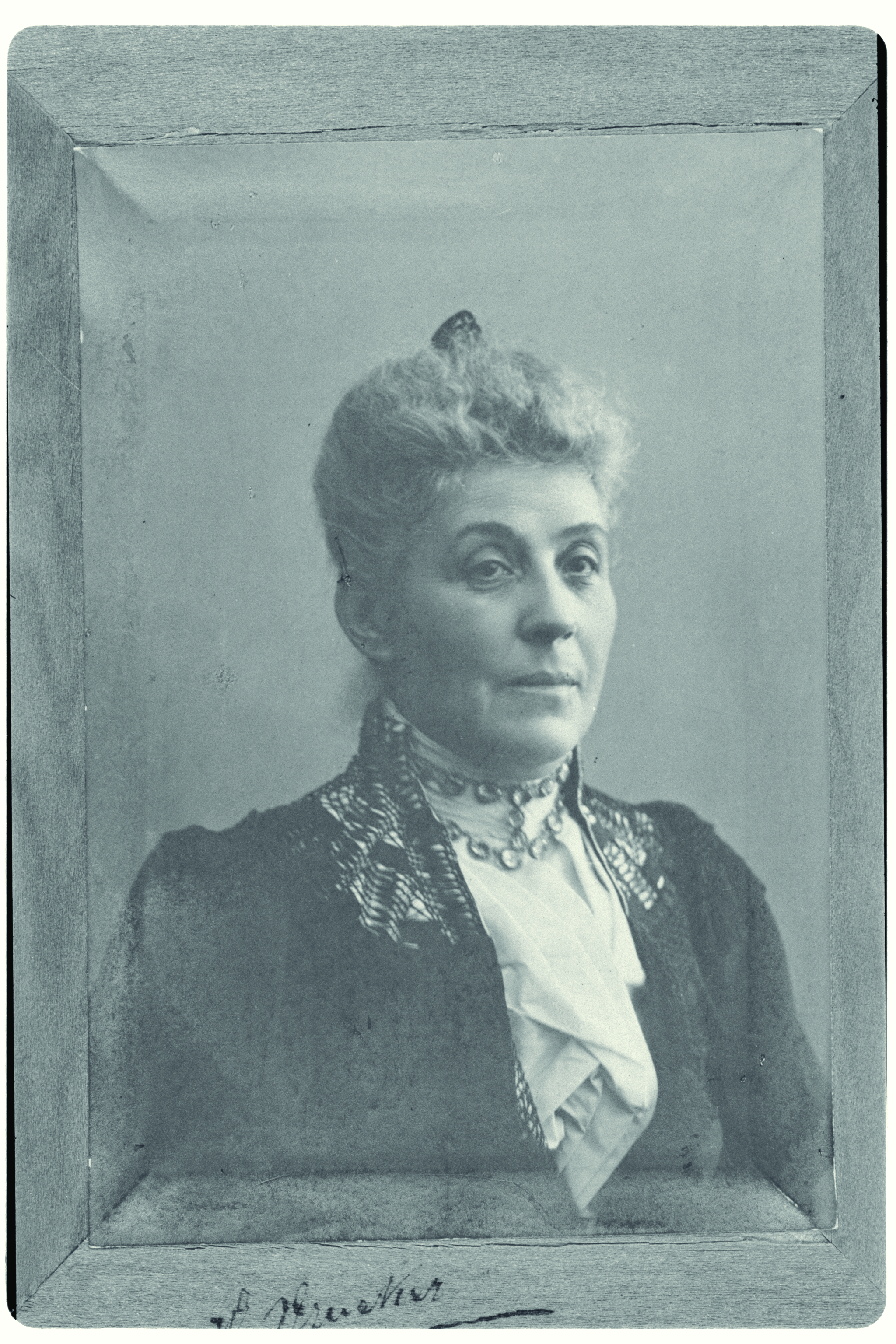

Wilhelmina Drucker (née Wilhelmina Elizabeth Lensing; 30 September 1847 – 5 December 1925) was a Dutch politician and writer. One of the first Dutch feminists, she was also known under her pseudonyms Gipsy, Gitano, and E. Prezcier.

== Life ==
Drucker was one of two daughters born to the seamstress Constantia Christina Lensing and the German-Jewish banker Louis Drucker. Her father refused to marry her mother or to legally recognise their children, meaning Wilhelmina grew up in difficult circumstances. She received a Catholic education took up the same profession as her mother and from 1886 onwards attended meetings of the Sociaal-Democratische Bond, the De Unie union, the Nederlandsche Bond voor Algemeen Kies- en Stemrecht (Dutch League for General Suffrage) and the freethinkers' association De Dageraad. In the following years socialism had a major formative influence on her. She argued from her personal experience against a wider background, analysing and understanding the social mechanisms affecting women and thus able to conceive of what action to take to bring about change. Under a pseudonym, she wrote a book attacking the double standards of her father's morality in only recognising children born to him by a richer woman.

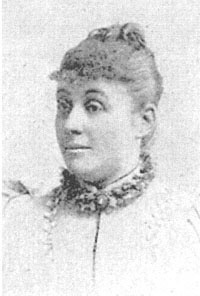
Young Wilhelmina Drucker

She also began a lawsuit against her half-brother, the liberal politician Hendrik Lodewijk Drucker, who had received an inheritance from Louis – she won it in 1888 and thus gained financial independence. Immediately after this she and other women from radical and socialist circles set up De Vrouw (The Woman), a weekly magazine for women and girls. In 1889, Drucker founded the Vrije Vrouwen Vereeniging (VVV, or Free Women's Association), which in 1894 developed into the Vereeniging voor Vrouwenkiesrecht (Women's Rights Association). In 1891, Drucker represented the VVV at the International Socialist Labor Congress in Brussels, the second congress of the Second International, where she and delegates from Germany, Austria and Italy called for a resolution that the manifestos of all countries' socialist parties' should include a call for full legal and political equality of men and women; this resolution was adopted by the congress.

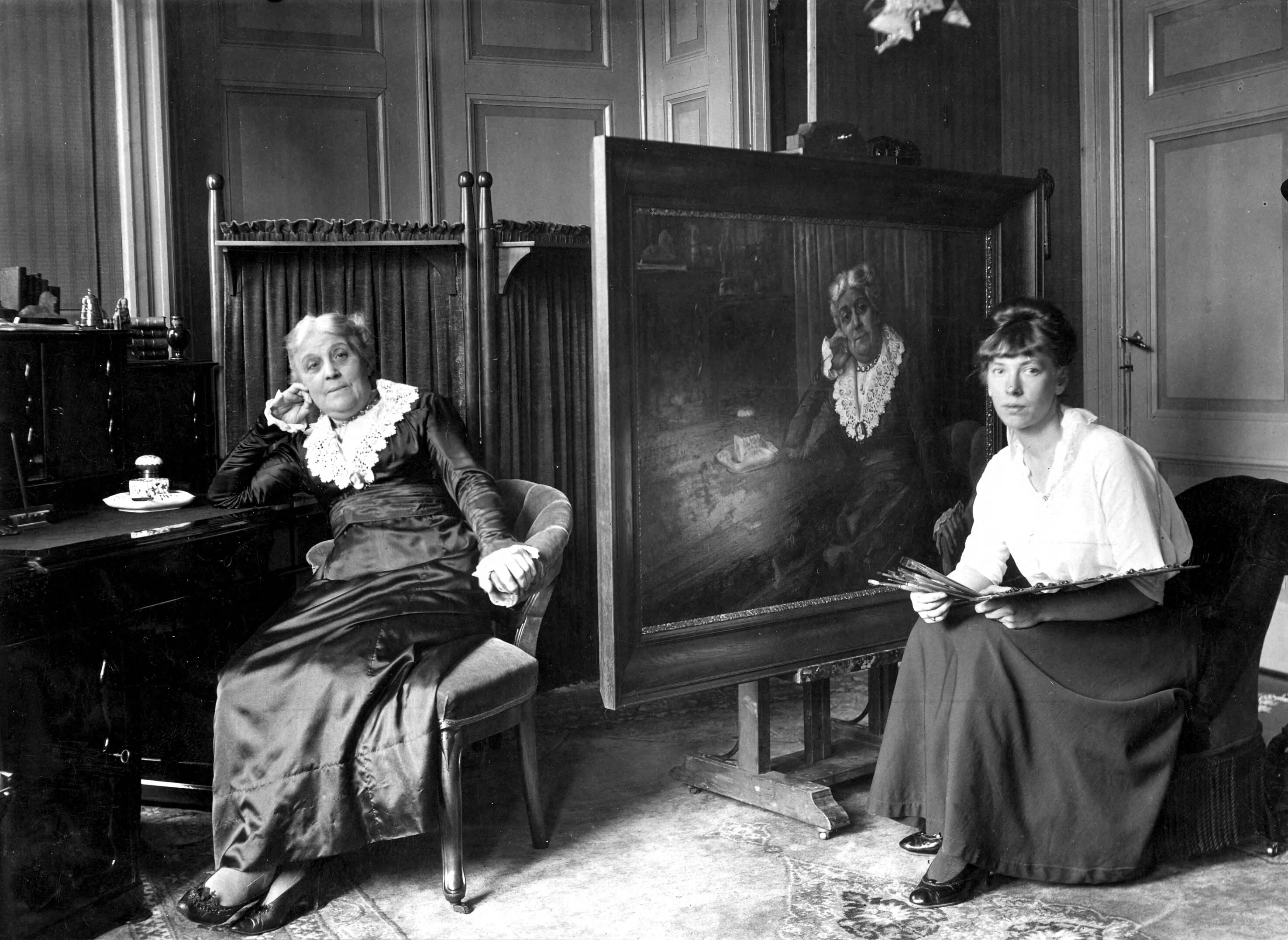
Wilhelmina Drucker with her portrait painted by Truus Claes in 1917 on the occasion of Drucker's seventieth birthday

In 1893, Drucker and her right-hand-woman Dora Schook-Haver founded the weekly magazine Evolutie (Evolution); this lasted until 1926. Drucker also lectured throughout the Netherlands, got involved in the establishment of several women's trade unions and in 1897 became a member of the newly founded the Vereeniging Onderlinge Vrouwenbescherming (VOV, or Women's Mutual Protection Society), which worked for the rights of unmarried mothers and their children. Drucker stated that the VOV should be a militant organisation uniting all women – married or unmarried, with or without children – to work in the public sphere for women's rights and against unjust laws and outdated morality. She explained her thinking and ideas on the mission and role of the VOV, laying the foundations for later activist organisations such as Blijf van mijn Lijf (literally 'Stay away from my body, a network of women's shelters) and Vrouwen tegen Verkrachting (Women Against Rape). For her militant calls for action to achieve women's equality, she was nicknamed 'IJzeren' (Iron) or 'Dolle' (Mad) Mina, monikers that gained even more traction after her staging of a symbolic public burning of women's corsets. The highly publicised activist feminist group Dolle Mina, started in 1970, was named in honour of Wilhelmina Drucker, which was celebrated by a public brassiere-burning ceremony in Amsterdam.

== Works ==
- (in Dutch) Over vrijen en trouwen, waar velen van houwen – [S.l.] : [s.n.], 1905. pp. 138–139
- (in Dutch) Vrouwenarbeid in het verleden en in het heden: rede gehouden op de Algemeene Vergadering van den Nationalen Vrouwenraad in Nederland op 26 April 1906 te Groningen / Wilhelmina Drucker. – [S.l.] : [s.n.], 1906. 10p.
- (in French) Autour du travail de la femme - Amsterdam : [s.n.], 1911. 14p.
- (in Dutch) Moederschap : sexueele ethiek / M. Cohen Tervaert-Israëls, J. Rutgers, G. Kaptein-Muysken, W. Drucker, Ch. Carno-Barlen, Est.H. Hartsholt-Zeehandelaar, Titia van der Tuuk, Martina G. Kramers, C.C.A. de Bruine-van Dorp, Lod. van Mierop, S. van Houten, J.C. de Bruïne; Nationaal Comité voor Moederbescherming en Sexueele Hervorming. – Almelo : Hilarius, 1913. 158p.
- (in Dutch) Waarom kiezen de vrouwen niet mee? Amsterdam : Vrije Vrouwenvereeniging, 1915. 2p.
- (in Dutch) Waarde voorstander(ster) / M.W.H. Rutgers-Hoitsema, Martina G. Kramers, W. Drucker, M.J. de Soete. – [S.L.] : Vereeniging "Nationaal Comité in zake wettelijke regeling van vrouwenarbeid", 1916. 1p.
- (in Dutch) Geen blinde volgelingen: opgedragen aan de leden der Vereeniging voor Vrouwenkiesrecht / J.S.R. Baerveld-Haver, Wilhelmina Drucker, Nine Minnema, Jacoba F.D. Mossel, M.S. Wiener. Amsterdam : [s.n.], 1916. 19p. Xeroks
- (in Dutch) De verbetering van het recht der vrouw. Par. 1. De Vrije Vrouwenvereeniging Amsterdam : Elsevier, 1918. 14p. Overdruk uit: De vrouw, de vrouwenbeweging en het vrouwensvraagstuk. Encyclopaedisch Handboek deel II onder redactie van C.M. Werker-Beaujon, Clara Wichmann en W.H.M. Werker p. 136–149.
- (in Dutch) Rapport van de Enquête-commissie, ingesteld door het Comité van Actie tegen het ontslag der gehuwde ambtenaressen / Wilhelmina Drucker, W. Willink-Altes. – [S.l.] : [s.n.], 1928. 3 p.
- (in Dutch) Internationaal Archief voor de Vrouwenbeweging: jaarboek = Yearbook International Archives for the Women's Movement : I. – Leiden : Brill, 1937. 175p. with photographs

== Note and bibliography ==
- (in Dutch) Bij de dood van een feministe : necrologieën over Wilhelmina Drucker / Marianne Braun In: Biografie bulletin. 14 (2004), 1 (voorjaar), p. 40-46 Portret van de dood van Wilhelmina Drucker (1847–1925) om enig uitzicht te bieden op haar publieke leven.
- (in Dutch) Missie aan de marge of aan het front? / Myriam Everard In: Et.vt. 22 (2003), 2, p. 117–118 In de rubriek 'Geef de pen door...' besteedt auteur aandacht aan katholieke vrouwengeschiedenis en gaat ze kort in op Wilhelmina Drucker en haar verhouding tot het katholicisme.
- (in Dutch) De Hollandse binnenkamer II (Thema) / Marianne Braun [et al.] In: Biografie bulletin. 10 (2000), 3, p. 200–216 In het artikel 'De bij wil koningin worden' besteedt Marianne Braun aandacht aan feministe en sociaal hervormster Wilhelmina Drucker, oprichtster van de Vrije Vrouwenvereeniging.
- (in Dutch) De bij wil koningin worden : het feministisch sprookje van Wilhelmina Drucker / Marianne Braun In: Biografie bulletin. 10 (2000), 3, p. 209–216 Wilhelmina Drucker leefde van 1847 tot 1925. Ze vond godsdienst, wet, traditie en mannelijke ijdelheid de vrouw belemmerden om net als haar wederhelft 'mens' te worden. De feministe, sociaal hervormster en oprichtster van de Vrije Vrouwenvereeniging wilde de vrouw uit de benauwde binnenkamer laten breken.
- (in Dutch) Geen woorden, maar daden : de radikalinski's van de vrouwenbeweging / Esmeralda Otten In: Savante. 6 (1998), 23(voorjaar), p. 15–16 Wilhelmina Drucker (1847–1925) en Emmeline Pankhurst (1858–1928) behoorden tot de radicale vleugel van de vrouwenbeweging. Zij streden, beiden op hun eigen manier, voor het invoeren van vrouwenkiesrecht in respectievelijk Nederland en Engeland.
- (in Dutch) Drie sprookjes van Wilhelmina Drucker : een bijdrage aan de cultuurgeschiedenis van het fin de siècle / Marianne Braun In: Feminisme en verbeelding. (1994), pp. 11–29 Analyse van de drie eerste fictieve bijdragen van Drucker (1847–1925) in de eerste jaargang van het blad Evolutie, waarin ze zowel 'persoonlijke' als 'politieke' credo's vertolkte.
- (in Dutch) Portret van een radicale baanbreekster : Wilhelmina Druckers strijd voor de vrouw als vrije mens / Tosca Snijdelaar In: Furore. 9 (1992), (mrt), pp. 18–22 Portret van Wilhelmina Drucker (1847–1925)
- (in Dutch) Mevrouw, ik groet U : necrologieën van vrouwen / Emma Brunt (samenst. en inl.). Amsterdam; [etc.] : Rap, 1987. 200p. : ill. Bundel van levensbeschrijvingen van vrouwen geschreven door tijdgenoten. Bevat o.a. een artikel over o.a. Wilhelmina Drucker (1847–1925).
- (in Dutch) De eerste feministische golf : zesde jaarboek voor vrouwengeschiedenis / Jeske Reys (red.), Tineke van Loosbroek (red.), Ulla Jansz (red.), [et al.]. Nijmegen : SUN, 1985. 208p. : ill. : lit. (Jaarboek voor vrouwengeschiedenis; 6) Bundel met artikelen over de geschiedenis van de eerste feministische golf in Nederland, waarbij aandacht is besteed aan de verschillende groeperingen en stromingen binnen de vrouwenbeweging. Daarnaast zijn van een aantal vrouwen biografische artikelen opgenomen. Bevat o.a. de artikelen: 'De vrouw als vrije mensch': een monument voor Wilhelmina Drucker / door Maria Henneman, en 'De geestelijke eenzaamheid van een radicaal-feministe : Wilhelmina Druckers ontwikkeling tussen 1885 en 1878' / door Fia Dieteren.
- (in Dutch) Vrouwen rond de eeuwwisseling / Aukje Holtrop (red.). Amsterdam : De Arbeiderspers, 1979. 204p. : lit. Eerder verschenen in: Vrij Nederland. Portretten van vrouwen die zich rond 1900 zowel binnen als buiten de georganiseerde vrouwenbeweging met de positie van vrouwen bezighielden. Bevat tevens een inleiding over de eerste feministische golf. Bevat portretten van: Mina Kruseman, Betsy Perk, Wilhelmina Drucker, Aletta Jacobs, Carry van Bruggen, Cornélie Huygens, Henriette Roland Holst-van der Schalk, Mathilde Wibaut, Carry Pothuis, Roosje Vos..
- (in Dutch) Wilhelmina Drucker : de eerste vrije vrouw / Deanna te Winkel-van Hall. Amsterdam : Stichting Internationaal Archief voor de Vrouwenbeweging, 1968. 84p
- (in Dutch) Mevrouw W. Drucker. 30 September 1847 – 5 December 1925 / Anna Polak. Amsterdam : Maatschappij voor Goede en Goedkoope Lectuur, 1926. pp. 177–187 Uit: Leven en werken. Maandblad voor meisjes en vrouwen. XI (1926), nr. 3.
- (in Dutch) Laatste nummer, gewijd aan de nagedachtenis van Mevr. W. Drucker (1847–1925) in leven redactrice van dit blad. Amsterdam : Evolutie, 1926. 16p. : ill.
- (in Dutch) George David : Wilhelmina Drucker en de schandaalroman George David / G. Prezcier, E. Prezcier. Amsterdam : Meijer, 1885. 162p.
- (in Dutch) Karakterschets Mevrouw W. Drucker. [14p.]
