= Vereeniging voor Vrouwenkiesrecht =

Dutch women's rights organization

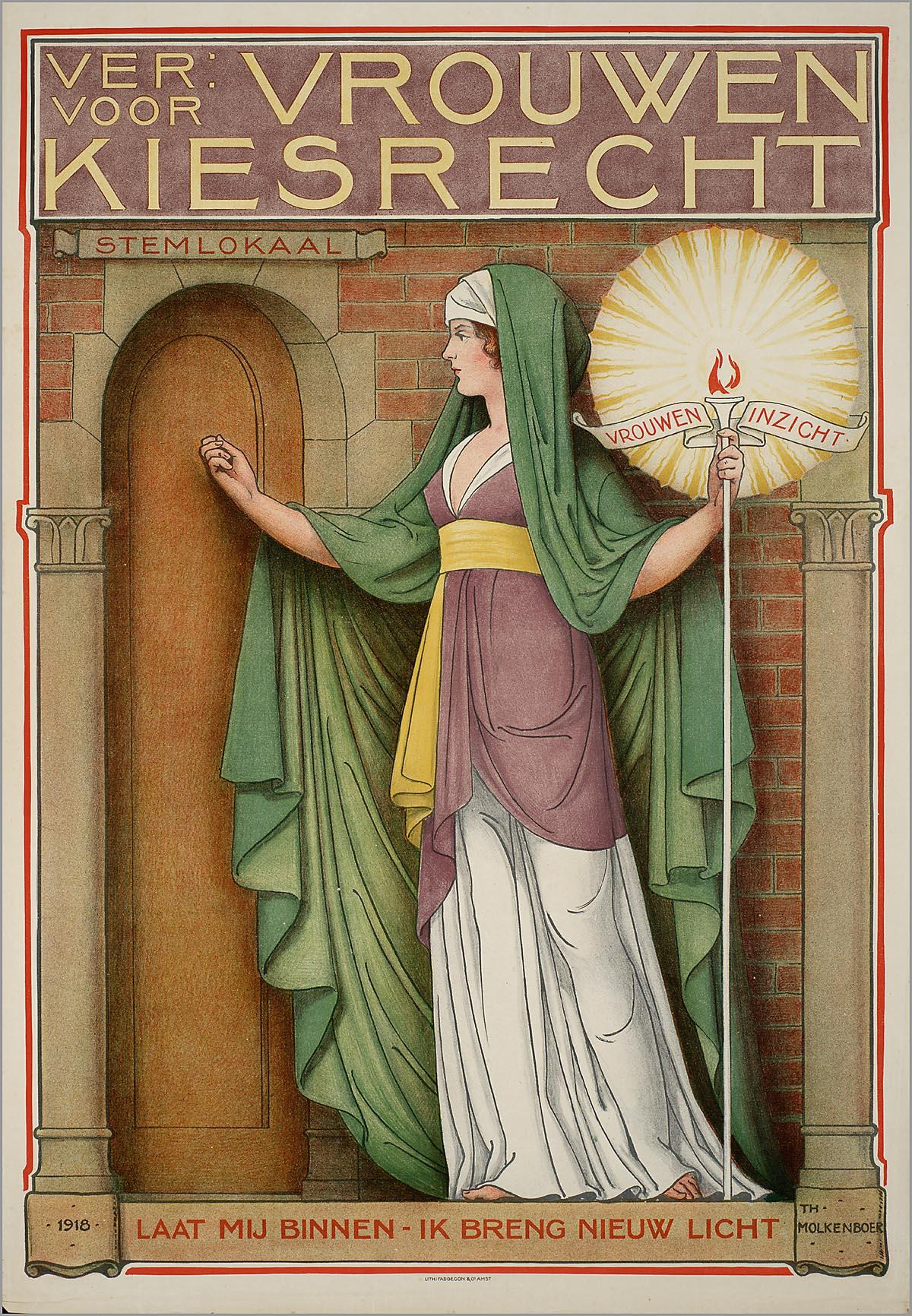
"Laat mij binnen - ik breng nieuw licht."; poster by Theo Molkenboer.

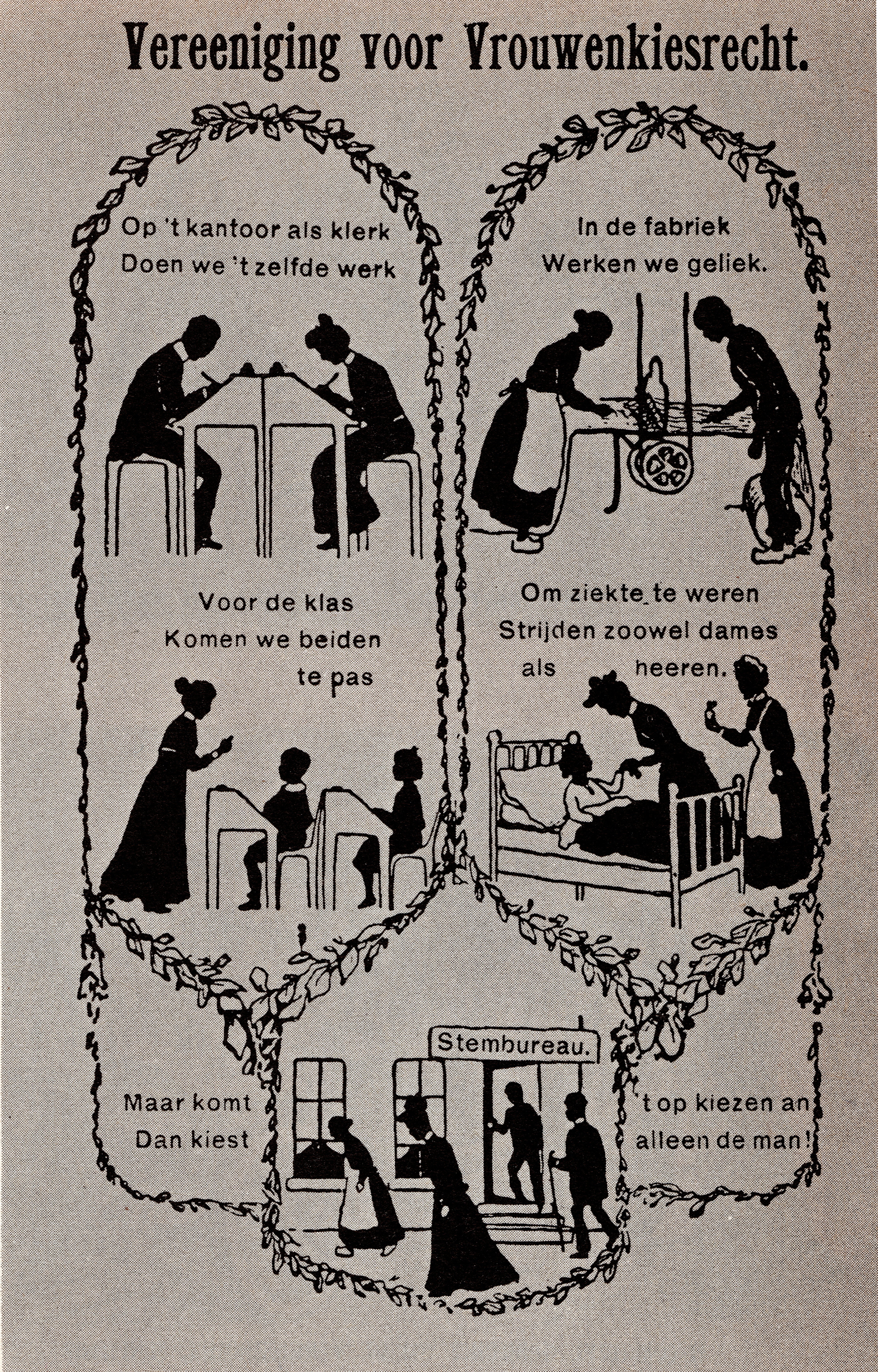
Vereeniging voor Vrouwenkiesrecht

The Vereeniging voor Vrouwenkiesrecht (Association for Women's Suffrage) was a women's rights organization active in the Netherlands from 1894 to 1919. It was devoted to women's suffrage. It was the main women's suffrage movement in the Netherlands. The Vereeniging changed its name in 1919 and would fuse with another association in 1930 and again in 1949 and still exists today.

== History ==
The Vereeniging had an audience with the Dutch Queen Wilhelmina and wrote letters to members of the Dutch parliament. In 1907 some members of the Vereeniging founded their own association, the Nederlandsche Bond voor Vrouwenkiesrecht (Dutch League for Women's Suffrage), which was more moderate. This was partly done out of disapproval for the more extreme measures English suffragettes used – measures that were not used by the Vereeniging but were not condemned by them either. The two associations would fuse together again in 1930.

After women's suffrage was achieved in 1919, the Vereeniging changed its name to the Vereniging van Staatsburgeressen (Association of Citizenesses) and kept striving for women to be independent, although the woman's role within the family was still important for the association. The Vereeniging also wrote to organisations to ask for women in high functions. In 1930 the association fused with the Nederlandsche Unie voor Vrouwenbelangen (Dutch Union for Women's Interests) and became the Nederlandse Vereniging voor Vrouwenbelangen en Gelijk Staatsburgerschap (Dutch Association for Women's Interests and Equal Citizenship) and in 1949 it fused with the Nationale Vereniging voor Vrouwenarbeid (National Association for Women's Labour) and became the Nederlandse Vereniging voor Vrouwenbelangen, Vrouwenarbeid en Gelijk Staatsburgerschap (Dutch Association for Women's Interests, Women's Labour and Equal Citizenship). This fusion still exists today.

== Magazine ==
The association published a monthly magazine called Maandblad van de Vereeniging voor Vrouwenkiesrecht, after 1919 called Maandblad van de Nederlandsche Vereeniging van Staatsburgeressen and after 1930 called Maandblad van de Nederlandsche Vereeniging voor Vrouwenbelangen en Gelijk Staatsburgerschap.

== Chairmembers ==
The association had a head management consisting of 9, 11 or 13 members and a daily management consisting of a president, vice president, secretary and a treasurer, who met in person seldom, but usually conversed in writing. Men were allowed in the head management, but not in the daily management.

Two presidents of the Vereeniging were:

- 1894–1902: Annette Versluys-Poelman
- 1903–1919: Aletta Jacobs

Other board members were, amongst others, Wilhelmina Drucker and Mien van Itallie-van Embden.

== See also ==
- Women's suffrage organizations
- List of suffragists and suffragettes
- Timeline of women's suffrage
