= Clara Meijers =

Dutch bank director, feminist, writer (1885 – 1964)

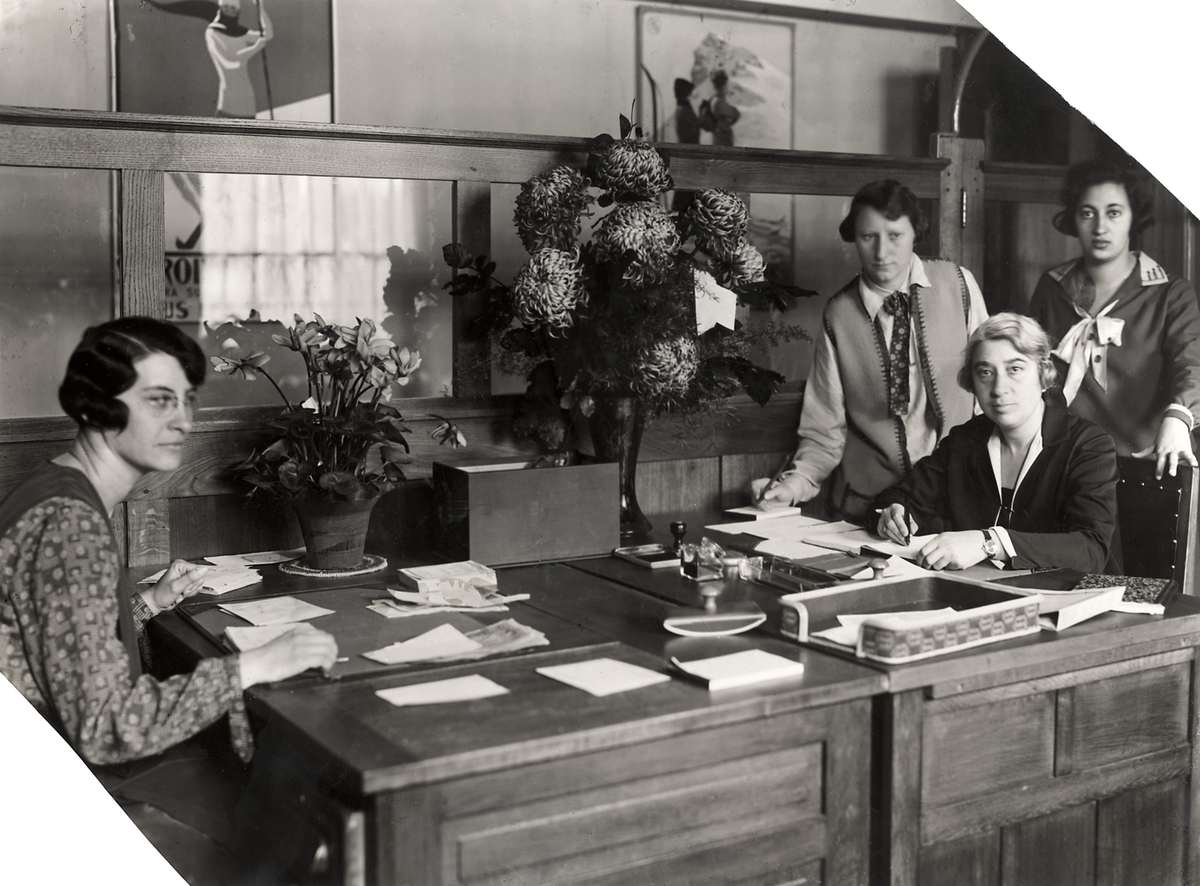
- Meijers (left) and her staff of the Women's Bank, 1928
- Born: Klara Mimi Meijers; 27 August 1885; Amsterdam, Netherlands
- Died: 13 October 1964 (aged 79); Bentveld, Netherlands
- Occupations: Banker, writer
- Parents: Isidor Meijers (father); Julie Wolff (mother)

Clara Mimi Meijers (27 August 1885 – 13 October 1964) was a Dutch banker, writer, and feminist. She founded a women's branch of the Robaver Bank in Amsterdam. She has been called a "pioneer of microfinancing." She was also a Holocaust survivor.

== Life and work ==
Klara (later changed to Clara) Meijers was born in Amsterdam to the physician, Isidor Meijers and Julie Wolff (1847–1933). She was the fifth child and an only daughter in a Jewish family of doctors.

She began work as a French teacher in The Hague, but disliked it. After working as a secretary at the Amsterdamsche Bank and then, the banking firm Huydecoper & Van Dielen in Utrecht, Meijers became executive secretary at Rotterdamsche Bankvereeniging (called Robaver) in Amsterdam in 1911.

Around 1910, Meijers became active in the women's movement. Her friends Mia Boissevain and Rosa Manus were among the organizers of the 1913 exhibition, De Vrouw 1813-1913 (The Woman) and, according to Janneka Martens, the exhibition was a turning point.

Meijers suggested to the organizers of the exhibition to also pay attention to the banking and office sector, because many women were employed in this sector, and [she] was appointed president of the committee for this sector. The exhibition paid no attention to the special 'women's bank' that had existed in Berlin since 1910, but this was a shining example for Meijers, because she had noticed that existing banks often refused to provide loans to women who wanted to start their own business. and male bank employees were unwilling to help working women manage their financial affairs.

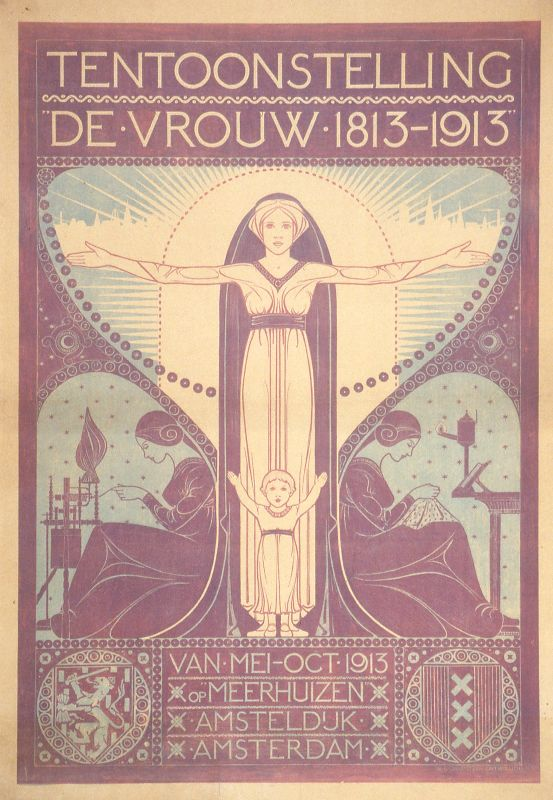
Exhibition poster for The Women (1813–1913)

As a result, Meijers was appointed president of the exhibition's Banking and Office Industry Committee and it was there that she first became acquainted with the Berlin Women's Bank, which still existed at that time.

=== Banker ===
Her first plans for a Dutch women's bank failed due to World War I, but in the 1920s she tried again to get it off the ground.

During the war, many women had been given jobs and wanted to be able to arrange their own finances, so she presented her idea to her employer, Robaver, and on 3 November 1928, the bank opened 'The Branch Office for Female Clients of Robaver' on the Rokin canal in Amsterdam with Meijers as a director. From 1928 to 1938, the entire bank staff were women. Their first customer was Clara's old friend, Rosa Manus.

With the establishment of the new branch, many women, including those who were unmarried, widowed or students, could open an account and manage it themselves. In addition, various women's organizations also opened accounts there. In addition to her work as a bank director, Meijers gave many lectures on financial security for women. Meijers was director until 1938. According to Janneke Martens, "Clara Meijers has made financial independence possible for many women. In the Women's Bank she founded, female clients were taken seriously and were able to manage their assets. The women's bank survived until 1971."

Her lending practice, "to grant credit to women without means who wanted to start their own company," has been cited as one of the first examples of microfinancing.

=== Women's Movement ===
In 1913, Meijers became a member of the Union for Women's Suffrage. She was also treasurer on the board of the International Archives for the Women 's Movement. In 1928 she was a co-founder of the Soroptimist club in North-Holland, part of an international association of women committed to improving human rights for women and girls. She was also a board member and treasurer of the National Union of Soroptimist Clubs. After the war she continued to write and speak about women's issues.

=== Deportation ===
Because of her Jewish heritage, Meijers had to resign her positions during World War II. She moved to various addresses, but in November 1943, she was forced to go to the Westerbork transit camp in the northeastern Netherlands, from which she was deported on 4 September 1944 to Czechoslovakia. She survived the Terezín concentration camp there. Prisoners there were released when the camp was liberated by Canadian troops in May 1945. In August 1945, Meijers moved into an apartment building in Amsterdam for single people on Roelof Hartplein in Amsterdam.

=== Writer ===
In 1946, Meijers published a biography of feminist Rosa Manus. In 1948 she wrote "the second part of From mother to daughter of Willemijn Posthumus-van der Goot with extensive chapters on the National Exhibition of Women's Labor of 1898, the suffrage struggle, the exhibition called The Woman 1813-1913, access to education and social developments."

== Personal life ==
In 1959, Meijers moved to Zandvoort, Netherlands, and died on 12 October 1964 in Bentveld, at the age of 79. She never married.

== Select publications ==
- Meijers, C. M. (1946). Een moderne vrouw van formaat: Leven en werken van Rosa Manus. (A modern woman of stature: Life and works of Rosa Manus) Brill.
- Meijers, C. M. (1948). Entry into society, 1898-1928, in: WH Posthumus-van der Goot, ed., From mother to daughter. Women's share in a changing world (Leiden) 193–372.
