= Deraniyagala (surname) =

Deraniyagala දැරණියගල
- Pronunciation: Dæraṇiyagala
- Language: Sinhala

Origin
- Region of origin: Sri Lanka

Deraniyagala (Sinhala: දැරණියගල, romanized: Dæraṇiyagala) is a Sinhalese surname.

== Notable people ==
- Ezlynn Deraniyagala (1908–1973), Ceylonese lawyer
- Justin Pieris Deraniyagala (1903–1967), Ceylonese painter
- Lionel Deraniyagala (1940–1994), Sri Lankan actor
- Paulus Edward Pieris Deraniyagala (1900–1976), Ceylonese zoologist
- Siran Upendra Deraniyagala (born 1942), Sri Lankan archaeologist
- Sonali Deraniyagala (born 1964), Sri Lankan economist
