= Marion Böker =

German women's rights leader

16th President of the International Alliance of Women
- In office 2021–2022
- Preceded by: Cheryl Hayles
- Succeeded by: Alison Brown

Marion Böker is a German women's rights leader and human rights expert who served as the 16th President of the International Alliance of Women (IAW), traditionally the main international organization that campaigned for women's suffrage.

She holds a master’s degree in modern history and mass communication. She has worked as a lecturer in politics and later as a consultant focusing on implementing human rights. She has published several books and articles.

Böker has been active within the National Council of German Women's Organizations, CEDAW Alliance, UN Women Germany, and the Alliance for UNSCR 1325 in Germany. She has served on the international board of the International Alliance of Women and became President in 2021. She is a member of the executive committee of the European Women's Lobby, representing IAW.

In 2021 Böker took part in a CSW forum co-hosted by IAW and its affiliate, the Icelandic Women's Rights Association, on the importance of the women's movement countering "anti-trans voices [that] are becoming ever louder and [that] are threatening feminist solidarity across borders," where she discussed her trans-inclusive position. In 2023 she participated in the podcast "Trans Inclusion in the Women's Movement," which pointed out that the established women's movement consistently supports LGBT+ minorities. Böker warned against anti-democratic forces and forces on the far right – including groups that portray themselves as feminists but who are actually right-wing and racist – that try to pit women's rights against the human rights of minorities, saying that "to make an organization inclusive, you have to fight for it." Böker stressed the importance of working on the basis of human rights, that are indivisible and universal, and to defend openness and democratic values.
