= Lyda Verstegen =

Dutch lawyer, activist

13th President of the International Alliance of Women
- In office 2010–2013
- Preceded by: Rosy Weiss
- Succeeded by: Joanna Manganara

Personal details
- Spouse: Floor Kist
- Education: University of Leiden
- Occupation: Lawyer

Lyda Verstegen is a Dutch lawyer and women's rights activist, and served as the 13th President of the International Alliance of Women (IAW) as well as its Chief Representative to the United Nations from 2010 to 2013. The IAW has associate and affiliated societies in 52 countries. She was elected President at the Congress in South Africa in 2010. She is a former president of the women's rights organization Vrouwenbelangen in the Netherlands. She has also been chair of the Appeals Commission for Personnel of the Ministry of Social Affairs in the Netherlands. She is married to diplomat Floor Kist. They have three children, Anne-Martijntje (1963), Florentius (1966) and Heleen (1970).

Verstegen graduated from the University of Leiden with a law degree in 1959. In 1961, Verstegen was a deputy clerk and appointed to be acting Registrar to the Dutch House of Representatives. At the same time that another woman, Joke Stoffels-van Haaften, was acting President of the Senate. During debate, female Member of Parliament Tineke Schilthuis stood in the pulpit on the Parliament's podium stage, located beside where Verstegen and Stoffels-van Haaften were seated. Schilthuis noted that this was the first occasion that the podium of the Netherlands' Parliament was entirely filled with women, which she said was "a symbol of the emancipation of women in public life". The event was photographed and published in newspapers. Verstegen is a former president of Vrouwenbelangen, a women's rights organization founded in the Netherlands in 1894.

Verstegen became president of IAW at the organization's 35th congress in 2010 in South Africa. Since then, she has raised the profile of the IAW at United Nations consultation activities and has fought for a greater role for non-governmental organizations (NGOs). Recent initiatives include the IAW's "inquiry into the status of a father's responsibility for the welfare of all his children in the nations of its member organisations"; Verstegen has also spoken out on behalf of women's rights as they relate to the current debt crisis in Europe, and on global economic initiatives and their impact on women.

As a representative of a non-governmental organization, she participated in the general debate at the United Nations Economic and Social Council (ECOSOC) following the presentation of the 2011 Millennium Development Goals. Verstegen delivered a speech outlining the challenges remaining for girls and women struggling for equality around the globe, such as:

early marriages and pregnancies; violence and sexual harassment by teachers and schoolmates, which made it dangerous for girls to attend school; child labour as a source of income or to work at home; and traditional practices of making girls less attractive to boys were noted, such as breast ironing. [Verstegen] urged countries to include the subject of early marriage, early pregnancy and harmful traditions in all information services for parents; to prevent pregnant girls and young mothers from dropping out; to provide comprehensive sexuality education for boys and girls in school; to prosecute teachers guilty of rape or who committed other forms of violence; and to make schools safer for girls.

In February 2012, Verstegen delivered a speech - "The Human Rights of Rural Women of All Ages" - at the United Nations' 56th Commission on the Status of Women.

In June 2011, Verstegen signed a letter of protest on behalf of the IAW, with representatives of many other human rights organizations, condemning violence and intimidation used against women demonstrating at Baghdad’s Tahrir Square on June 10, 2011. The letter called for an end to government-supported sexual assault used against female demonstrators.

Verstegen is a member of the Coalition for a European Union Year to End Violence Against Women, an initiative launched by the European Women's Lobby (EWL) in 2012, signing on behalf of the IAW.
