= Ester Graff =

Danish businesswoman and feminist (1897–1991)

4th President of the International Alliance of Women
- In office 1952–1958
- Preceded by: Hanna Rydh
- Succeeded by: Ezlynn Deraniyagala

Personal details
- Born: 3 May 1897
- Died: 23 January 1991 (aged 93)
- Occupation: Businesswoman

Ester Graff (3 May 1897 – 23 January 1991) was a Danish businesswoman and feminist. She worked for what later became Unilever from 1922, and after World War II became CEO of the Danish branch of the marketing bureau Lintas. From 1952 to 1958, she served as the 4th President of the International Alliance of Women.
