= Rosa Manus =

Dutch pacifist and female suffragist (1881 – 1942)

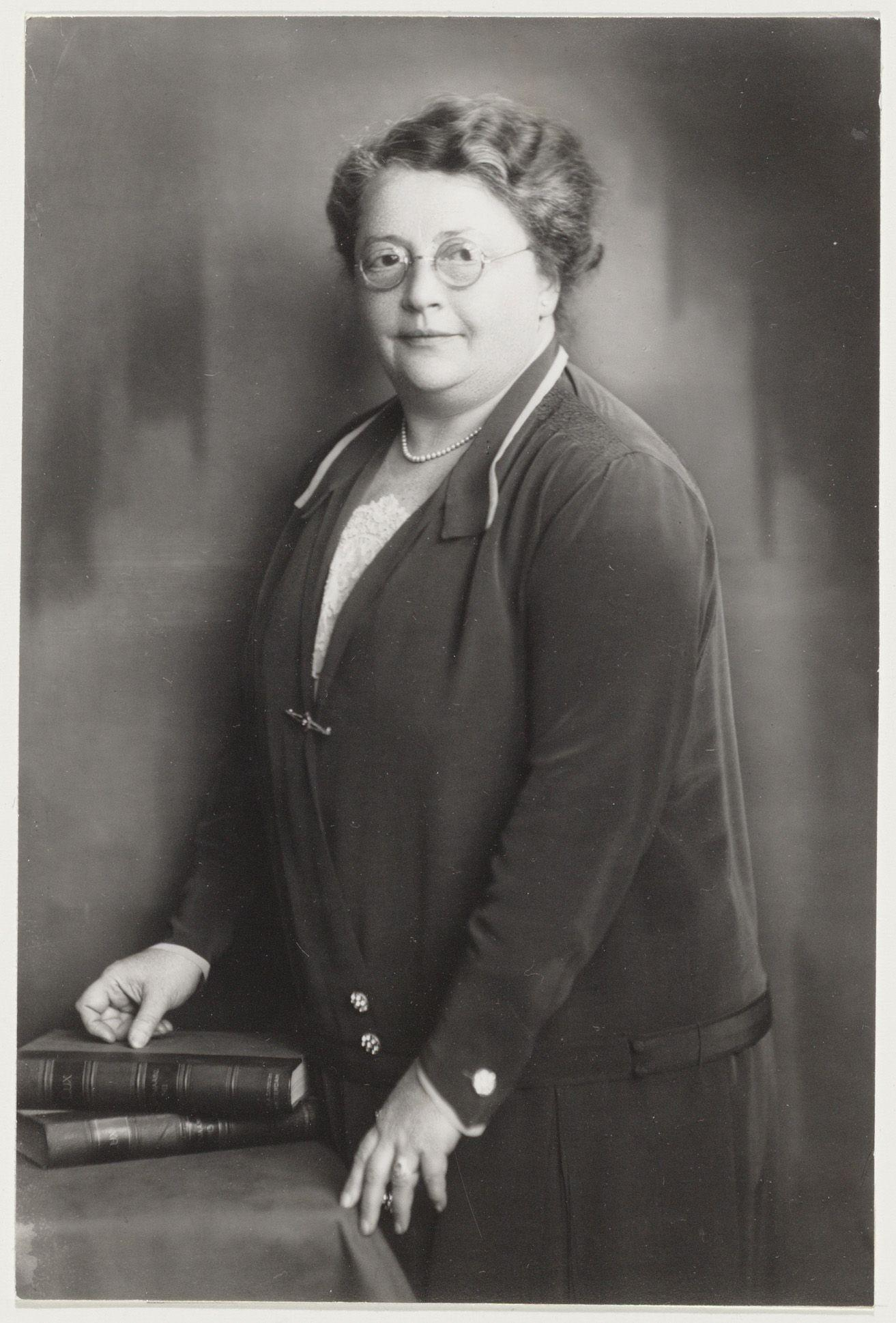
- Manus in 1928
- Born: Rosette Susanna Manus; 20 August 1881; Amsterdam, Netherlands
- Died: 1942 (aged 60–61); Auschwitz or Ravensbruck or Bernburg, Nazi Germany
- Known for: Sufferagist; Women's rights advocate Pacifist

Rosette Susanna "Rosa" Manus (Dutch pronunciation: [roːˈsɛtə syˈsɑnaː ˈroːsaː ˈmaːnʏs]; 20 August 1881 – 1942) was a Jewish Dutch pacifist and female suffragist involved in women's movements and anti-war movements, who was a victim of the Holocaust and died in Gestapo custody. She served as the president of the Society for Female Suffrage, the vice president of the Dutch Association for Women's Interests and Equal Citizenship, and was one of the founding members of the Women's International League for Peace and Freedom (WILPF) as well as its secretary. She firmly believed that women could work together across the world to bring peace. Although Manus was fairly well known in feminist circles in the 1920s and 1930s, she remains relatively unknown today. She was involved in feminist work for about thirty years during her lifetime and was known as a "feminist liberal internationalist."

== Early years ==
Rosette Susanna Manus was born in 1881 in Amsterdam, Netherlands, the second of seven children to affluent Jewish parents. Her father was Henry Philip Manus, a tobacco merchant, and her mother was Soete Vita Israël, a homemaker. While the Manus family was Jewish, they were fairly assimilated. At-home education was the norm for Jewish women during the time, and Manus's upbringing was no different. Her father prevented her from attending university and becoming a nurse. Activism, therefore, became her outlet. As an incredibly wealthy woman, a modern-day millionaire through inheritance, Manus joined the elite ranks of female activist leadership.

== Women's Suffrage and Pacifism Work ==
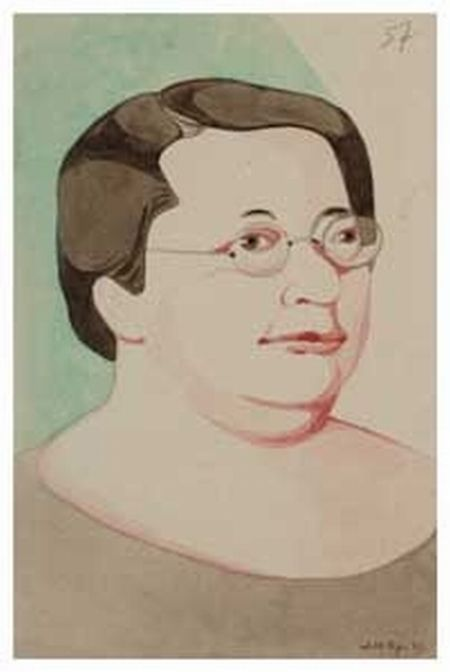
1930s portrait of Rosa Manus

=== Suffrage ===
Manus became involved with the international women's suffrage movement in 1908 at the Congress of the International Woman Suffrage Alliance (IWSA), later renamed the International Alliance of Women (IAW). At the 1908 Congress, she met Dutch suffragist Aletta Jacobs and American suffragist Carrie Chapman Catt, who would become lifelong colleagues and friends. Manus was devoutly loyal to the IWSA, and as its vice president, she actively resisted talk of its replacement with the World Women's Party. This opposition was based mainly on the personal issues she had with the leadership of Alice Paul.

Following the 1908 Fourth Conference of the International Woman Suffrage Alliance in Amsterdam, Manus became a board member of the Dutch Association for Women's Suffrage (Vereeniging voor Vrouwenkiesrecht, VVK). In the VVK, Manus worked closely alongside Mia Boissevain on the Propaganda Committee. Together they organized a 1913 exhibition, "De Vrouw 1813–1913," (The Woman) on the lives of Dutch women and successfully argued for women's full citizenship in the Netherlands.

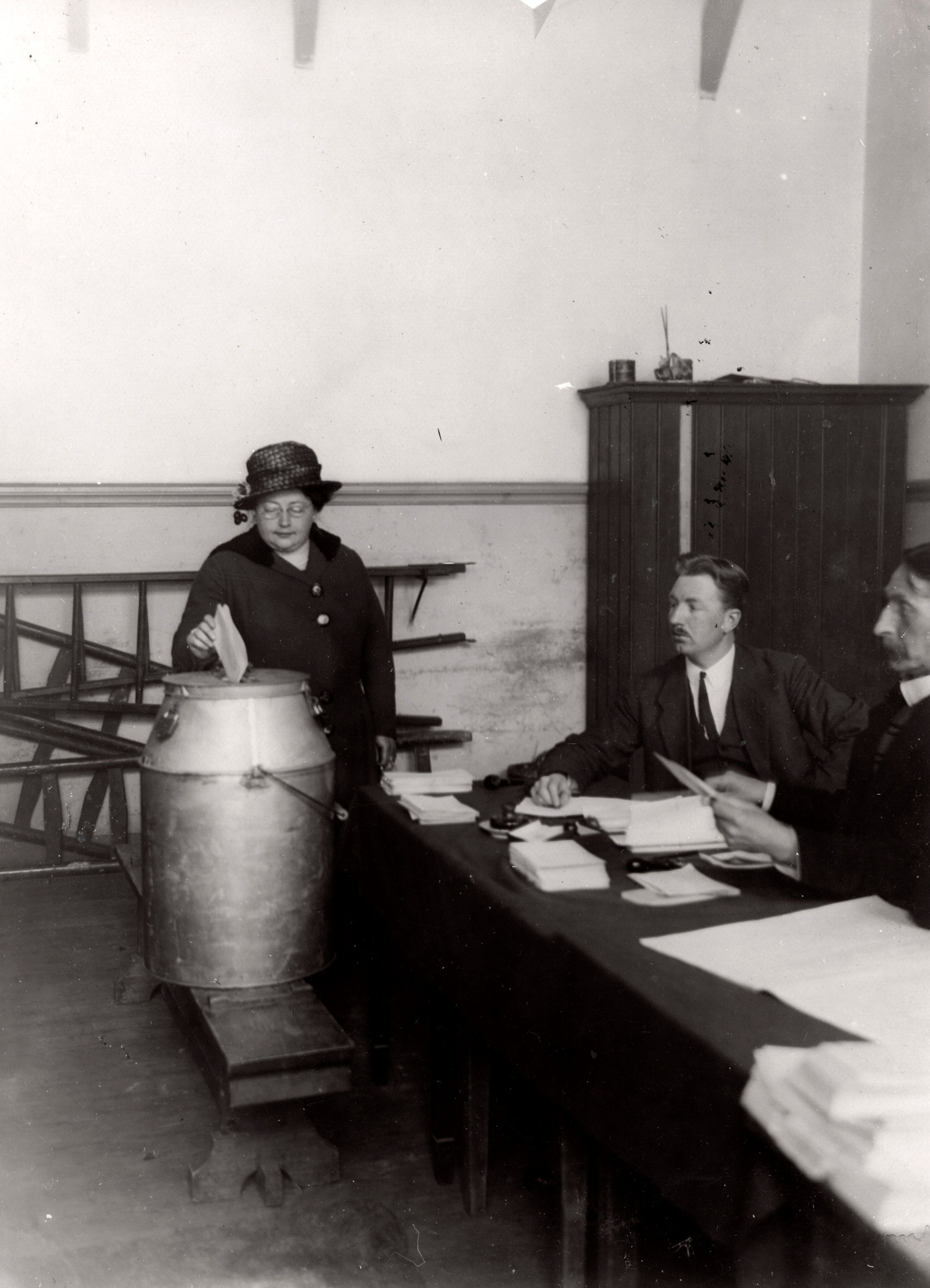
Women's suffrage. A polling station where Rosa Manus (1881-1942) casts her vote. In 1919, women in the Netherlands gained active suffrage.

In 1915, Manus played an integral role in organizing the International Congress of Women at The Hague, where she was appointed secretary of a new International Committee of Women for Permanent Peace, later known as the Women's International League for Peace and Freedom (WILPF). Manus and Aletta Jacobs are often credited with the survival of WILPF through the First World War.

Manus accompanied Carrie Chapman Catt, then-President of the IWSA, on a world tour in 1922–1923. They toured Latin America (visiting Brazil, Argentina, Uruguay, Chile and Peru) where they met with many fellow female activists, including Bertha Lutz, and discussed issues of Latin American women's suffrage.

Along with other IAW members, Manus attended the Week of Women Suffrage Campaign in Egypt to aide Egyptian women in their efforts to gain the vote in 1935. She also attended the 13th Conference of the International Woman Suffrage Alliance in 1939.

=== Peace Movements ===
Manus participated in a number of peace movements throughout the 1930s. She served as secretary of the Peace and Disarmament Committee, a women's international organization. Her job consisted of collecting signatures to protest war in advance of the Geneva Disarmament Conference in 1932.

Later, in 1936, Manus served as secretary for the Rassemblement Universel pour la Paix (RUP) and the World Peace Congress. For her efforts, the Dutch Police put her under surveillance. Due to her work, Catholics and national socialists in the Netherlands launched a "hate-campaign" against her because she was a Jewish woman with significant political and social standing.

=== Other Women's Organizations ===
In 1935, together with Johanna Naber and Willemijn Posthumus-van der Goot, Manus established the International Archives for the Women's Movement (IAV), later known as the International Information Centre and Archives for the Women's Movement and currently known as Atria Institute on Gender Equality and Women's History which is located in Amsterdam. Manus's papers are currently located in these archives, however, they were only recovered in 1992 when they were found in Moscow. When the Nazis invaded the Netherlands in 1940, they took the papers from the IAV and moved them to an unknown location in Berlin. How and when her papers were taken from Berlin to Moscow remains unknown but it appears that only a fraction of her documents survived.

In 1932 Manus founded the Vrouwen Electriciteits Vereeniging (Dutch Electrical Association for Women) and renamed Nederlandse Vrouwen Electriciteits Vereniging (Dutch Women's Electricity Association) in 1933.

Manus was made an Officer of the Order of Orange-Nassau by royal decree on August 22, 1936.

== International Feminist Connections ==
Rosa Manus felt part of the international women's movement as evidenced from pieces of writing to Mary Sheepshanks about the publication of the feminist journal Jus Suffragii. Such connections were also evident in her writings to Carrie Chapman Catt, whom she described repeatedly as a mother-like figure.

Catt and Manus toured Europe together and developed a close relationship. Manus felt comfortable in her relationship with Catt, enough so that she exposed her friend to newly emerging sexual culture of European society. She took Catt to a Parisian show fraught with nudity in order to educate Catt on national differences of women's ideals on sexuality and exposing Catt's limited sexual awareness due to her Puritan upbringing.

== Judaism and Antisemitism ==
Women's organizations of the twentieth century often had both Antisemitic and anti-Muslim tendencies since they were predominantly run by Protestant women. Manus was part of the first wave of Jewish women who started to refer to themselves as feminists. Within these organizations, Manus often faced pressure to conform and not give other Jewish women positions because the organizations did not want to seem too Jewish. Manus spoke of her support for Carrie Chapman Catt's aide to Jewish refugees through her letters, but she found she needed to distance herself from that activism because of her own Jewish identity.

Manus's Jewishness brought her into conflict with other feminists, particularly those from Muslim countries. The issue of immigration of Jewish people to Palestine in the 1920s and 1930s kept Muslim and Jewish women in the region from uniting over feminist causes. This was true for Manus and Egyptian feminist Huda Sha'rawi who clashed over the issue even though the IAW and WILPF held Britain responsible for clashing interests in Palestine. Sha'rawi strongly advocated for the Palestinians stating they were experiencing violence under British colonial rule while Manus and other feminists focused on the persecution of Jews during World War II. This caused further conflict between the two women. At an IWSA meeting in 1939, Manus came into conflict with Sha'rawi who was a representative from Egypt. They had conflicting views about Palestine.

As Nazi Germany rose to power in the 1930s, Manus grew aware of the threat to herself and her movement. While attending a play in London, England, Manus first encountered the plot of the Nazi regime to kill the Jewish people. It was at this point that Manus donated her papers to the IAV.

In 1933, after attending the Geneva Disarmament Conference, Manus helped found and became the president of the Dutch Neutraal Vrouwencomite' voor de Vluchtelingen (Neutral Women's Committee for Refugees).

She was accused at various points of both communism and pacifism and was particularly targeted on top of these issues because she was Jewish and a woman.

== Death ==
The Gestapo arrested Manus between August 10 and August 14, 1941 and deported her to Germany. They arrested Manus due to her actions as a pacifist activist, however, they deported her because she was Jewish rather than because of her political actions. First she was taken to Auschwitz and then was transferred to Ravensbrück concentration camp (a camp for political prisoners and Jews) by train in October 1941. Multiple sources suggest that she was gassed in the Nazi euthanasia mental hospital of Bernburg in 1942, but there is conflicting information around her place and date of death.

Manus is a less well-known figure because she left few personal texts behind and she did not write a memoir like other feminists of her era. She did not feel as though she was a particularly important person. She often refrained from taking positions of immediate leadership because of her Jewishness, but she accepted on occasion because she was the lone Jewish female representative who had the chance and felt it was important in certain circumstances to step up - she always claimed her actions were for her feminism rather than her Jewishness.

== See also ==
- List of peace activists
- Manus friend and biographer, Clara Meijers
