= Louise Beijerman =

Dutch sculptor (1883–1970)

- Born: 11 October 1883; Leiden, Kingdom of the Netherlands
- Died: 15 July 1970 (aged 86); Amsterdam
- Education: Rijksakademie van beeldende kunsten
- Occupations: art historian, sculptor

Louise Elisabeth Beijerman (born 11 October 1883 in Leiden – died 15 July 1970 in Amsterdam) was a Dutch sculptor and a teacher of art history and drawing.

== Early life and education ==
Louise Beireman studied at the Hogere Burgerschool, graduating in 1900. In 1905, she obtained a qualification from the Rijksnormaal voor Teekenonderwijzers (State Normal School for Drawing Teachers). From 1906 to 1912, she studied at the Rijksakademie van beeldende kunsten in Amsterdam, while simultaneously working as a teacher of painting and art history in Amsterdam and Utrecht.

Until 1907, she was the only female student in Bart van Hove's sculpture class at the academy. Around 1911, while still pursuing her studies, she trained as a pupil under the Catalan sculptor José Clara at an academy in Paris a professional association that continued until the end of the 1930s. In 1913, Beireman studied stone sculpture at the Royal Academy of Fine Arts, Brussels. Until approximately September 1917, she shared a studio with a painter named Anglin Valens, a friend from her time at the Amsterdam Academy. Between 1922 and 1924, she attended evening classes in modeling and ceramics for sculptors at the Quellinusschool of Applied Arts, under the instruction of Bert Ninoy. By the mid-1920s, her income from commissioned projects and freelance work was sufficient for her to leave her teaching career behind.

== Career ==
Bierman undertook numerous trips across Europe, driven by both educational and personal motives. In 1925, 1927, and 1930, she traveled to Genoa with her father; she also made two trips to the United States. In 1938, Louise Bierman moved into a space within an old school building in the Moelenpoort district of Amsterdam, which served as her studio and workshop. Because she had not registered with the Nederlandsche Kultuurkamer (Dutch Chamber of Culture) a regulatory body established by the German occupiers during World War II to enforce censorship, and in which all active artists were required to hold membership, she was unable to accept official commissions after 1942 and faced difficulties in procuring raw materials. In the post-war period, she focused primarily on creating portraits, as well as works for building facades and relief sculptures.

== Death ==
In August 1969, she moved to the Willem Mackenziehuis, a care facility operated by the Remonstrant congregation, where she died in 1970.

Louise Bierman was a member of the Nederlandsche Vrouwenclub (Dutch Women's Club), the Soroptimist Club, the Provinciaal Utrechts Genootschap voor Kunsten en Wetenschappen (Provincial Utrecht Society for Arts and Sciences), and the association Artis et Amicitia.

== Works ==
Louise Beirnaert worked with materials such as clay, marble, plaster, limestone, and wood. Her portraits were generally realistic, whereas her architectural sculptures tended to be more stylized. Often working on commission, she created portraits primarily of children as well as figurative works. During the 1920s and 1930s, she received commissions for façade elements and architectural sculptures; for instance, between 1925 and 1926, she produced architectural sculptures, a bronze relief, and wood carvings for the De Bijenkorf department store in The Hague.She also created sculptures for fountains and churches based on specific designs, including a fountain in the city of Venlo (1921) and works for the Remonstrant Church in Amsterdam (1934). In some of these projects, she collaborated with Piet Kramer and Michel de Klerk, two prominent figures of the Amsterdam School.

Works by Louise Beirnaert are held in the collections of museums such as the Rijksmuseum in Amsterdam, the Kunstmuseum Den Haag, and Museum De Lakenhal in Leiden.

== Exhibitions (selection) ==
- 1913: De Vrouw 1813–1913, Amsterdam
- 1915: Annual exhibition Kunstenaarsvereniging Sint Lucas, Stedelijk Museum Amsterdam
- 1916: Annual exhibition Kunstenaarsvereniging Sint Lucas, Stedelijk Museum Amsterdam
- 1920: Venice Biennale, Dutch Pavilion
- 1920: Vereniging St. Maarten, Utrecht
- 1921: Nederlandsche Kring van Beeldhouwers, Stedelijk Museum Amsterdam
- 1923: Regeeringsjubileum 1898 - 1923: tentoonstelling van Nederlandsche beeldende kunstenaars. Exhibition on the occasion of Queen Wilhelmina's jubilee, Stedelijk Museum Amsterdam
- 1933: Works of art, organized by the International Committee for Schoone Arts. Stedelijk Museum Amsterdam
- 1938: Nederlandse Kring van Beeldhouwers, Stedelijk Museum Amsterdam
- 1939: Onze kunst van heden, Rijksmuseum Amsterdam
- 1941: Nederlandse Kring van Beeldhouwers, Stedelijk Museum Amsterdam
- 1951: British and Dutch women exposed, Museum Fodor Amsterdam
- 1999: Dageraad van de moderne art: Leiden and omgeving 1890 - 1940, Museum De Lakenhal Leiden

== Gallery ==
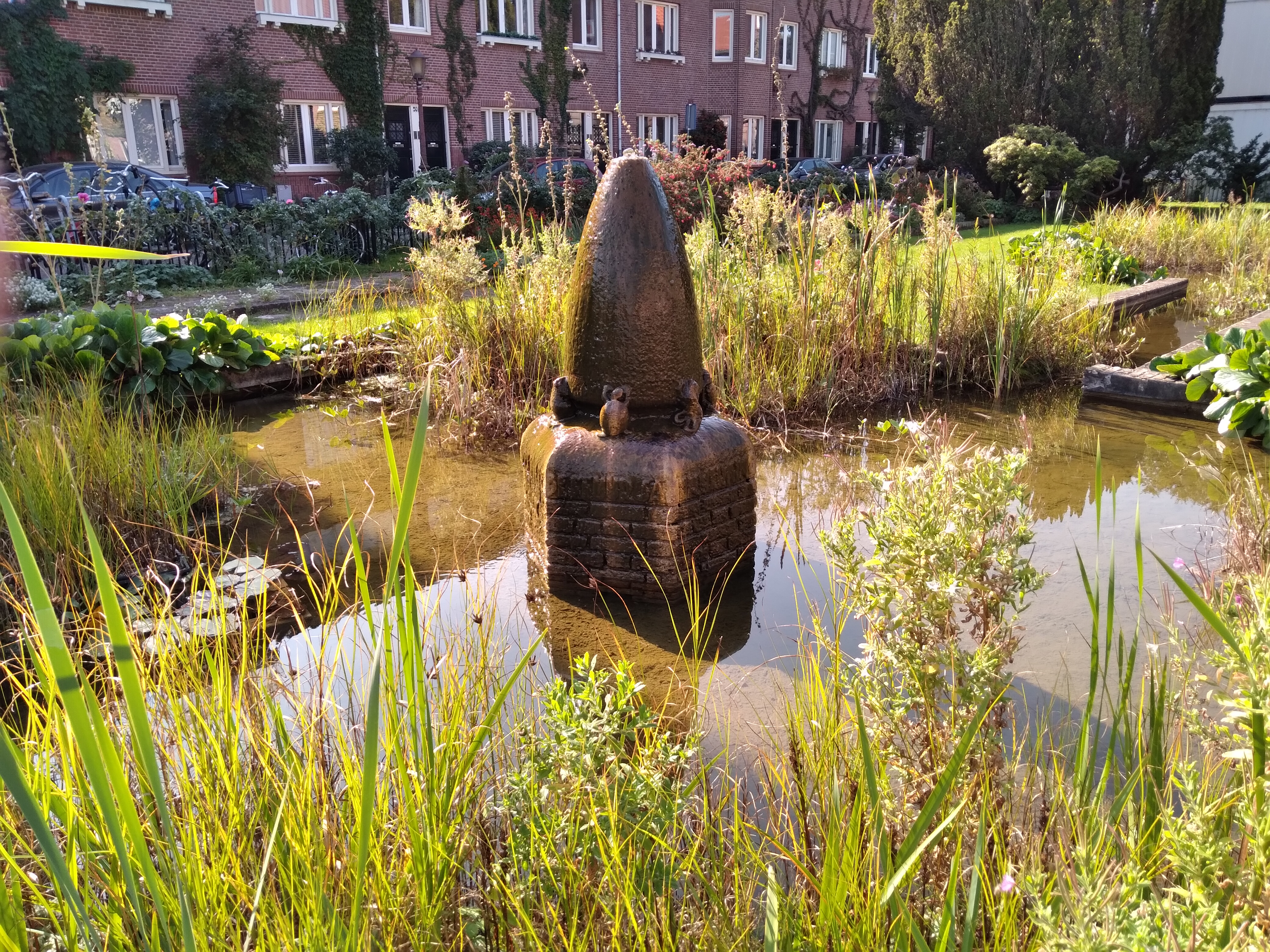
Drinking fountain, Harmoniehof Amsterdam

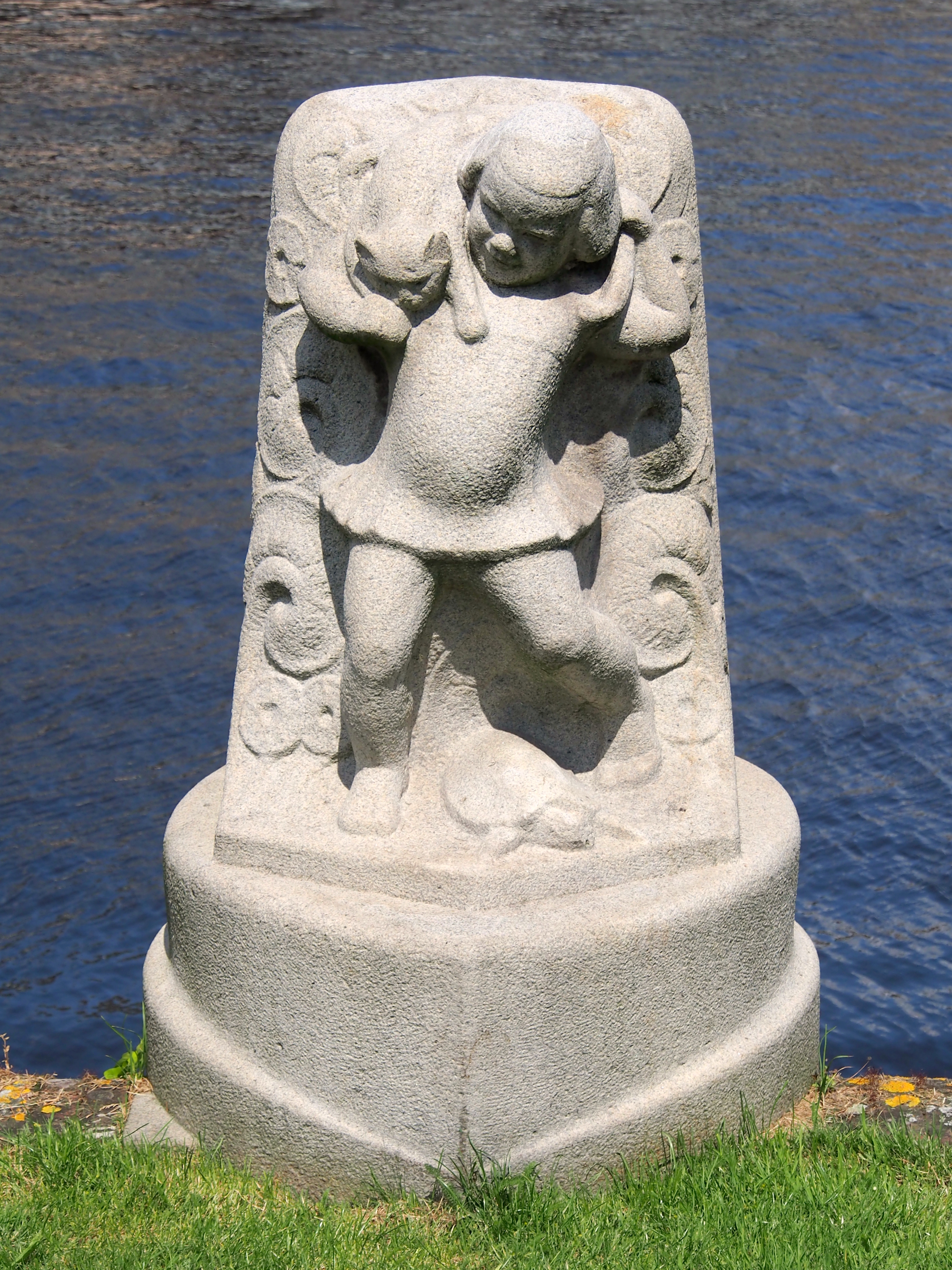
Girl with a cat on her shoulder, Muzenplein Amsterdam

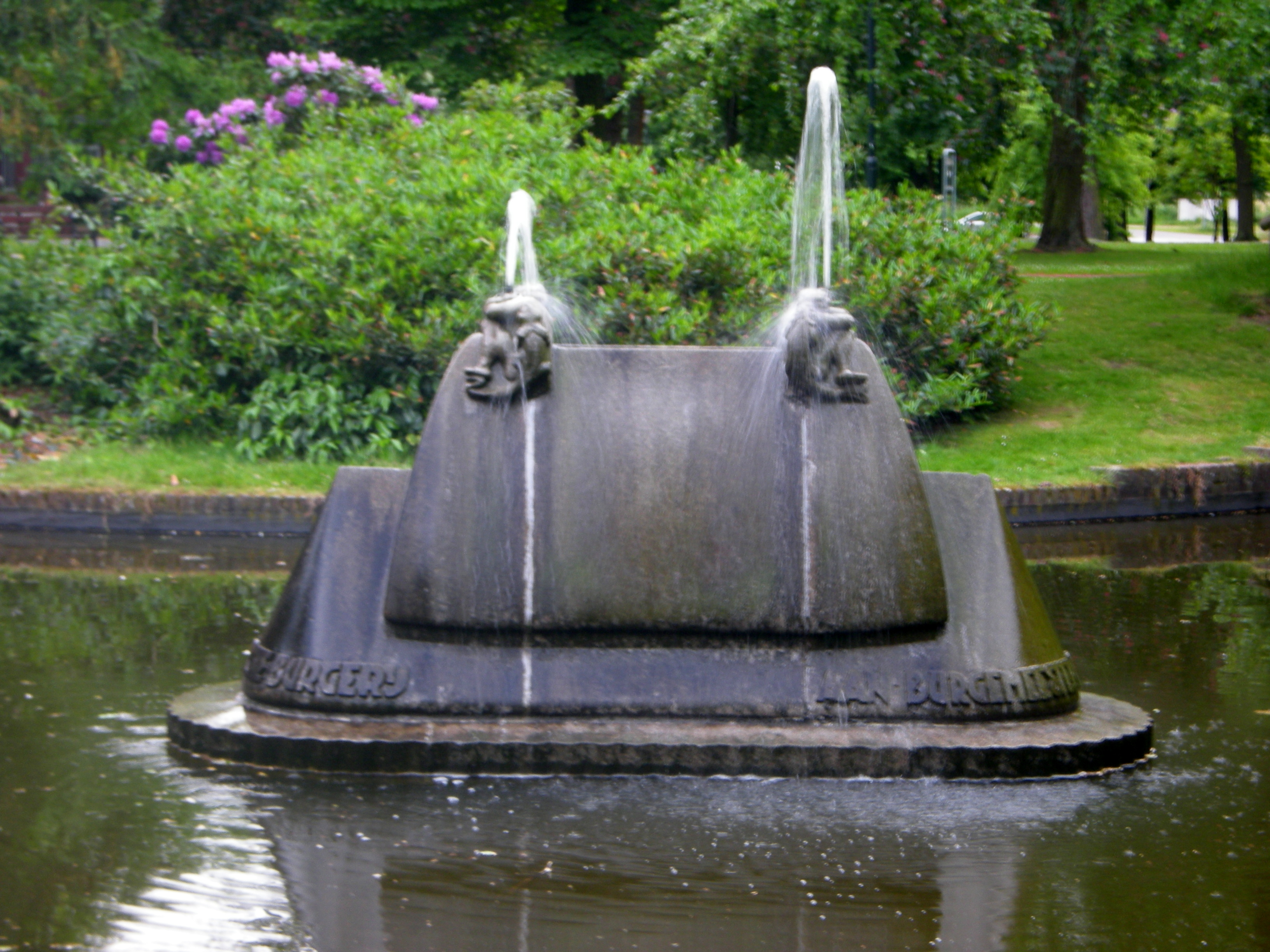
Fountains, Wilhelminapark Venlo

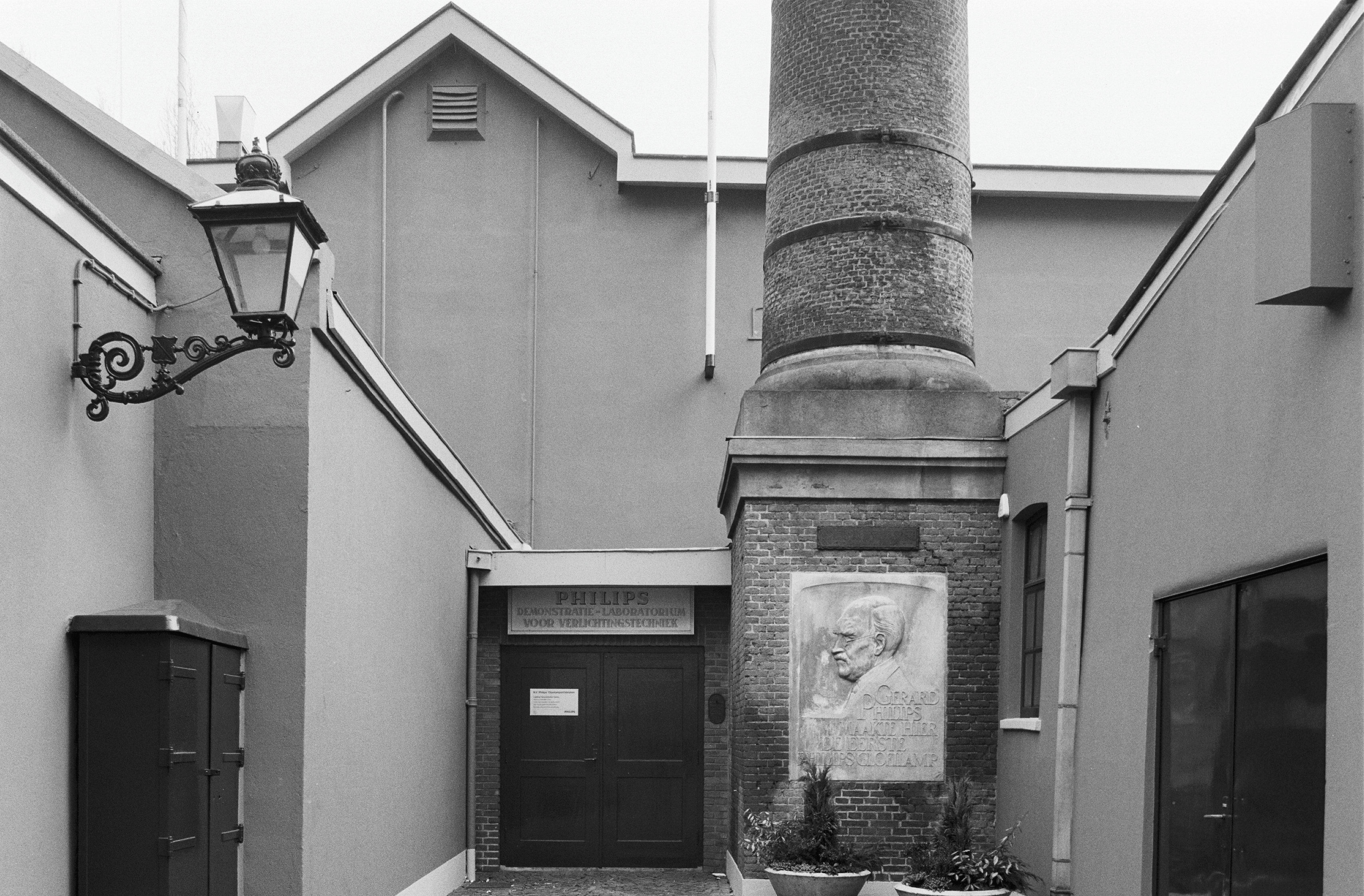
Reliëf van Gerard Philips, Philips Building, Eindhoven

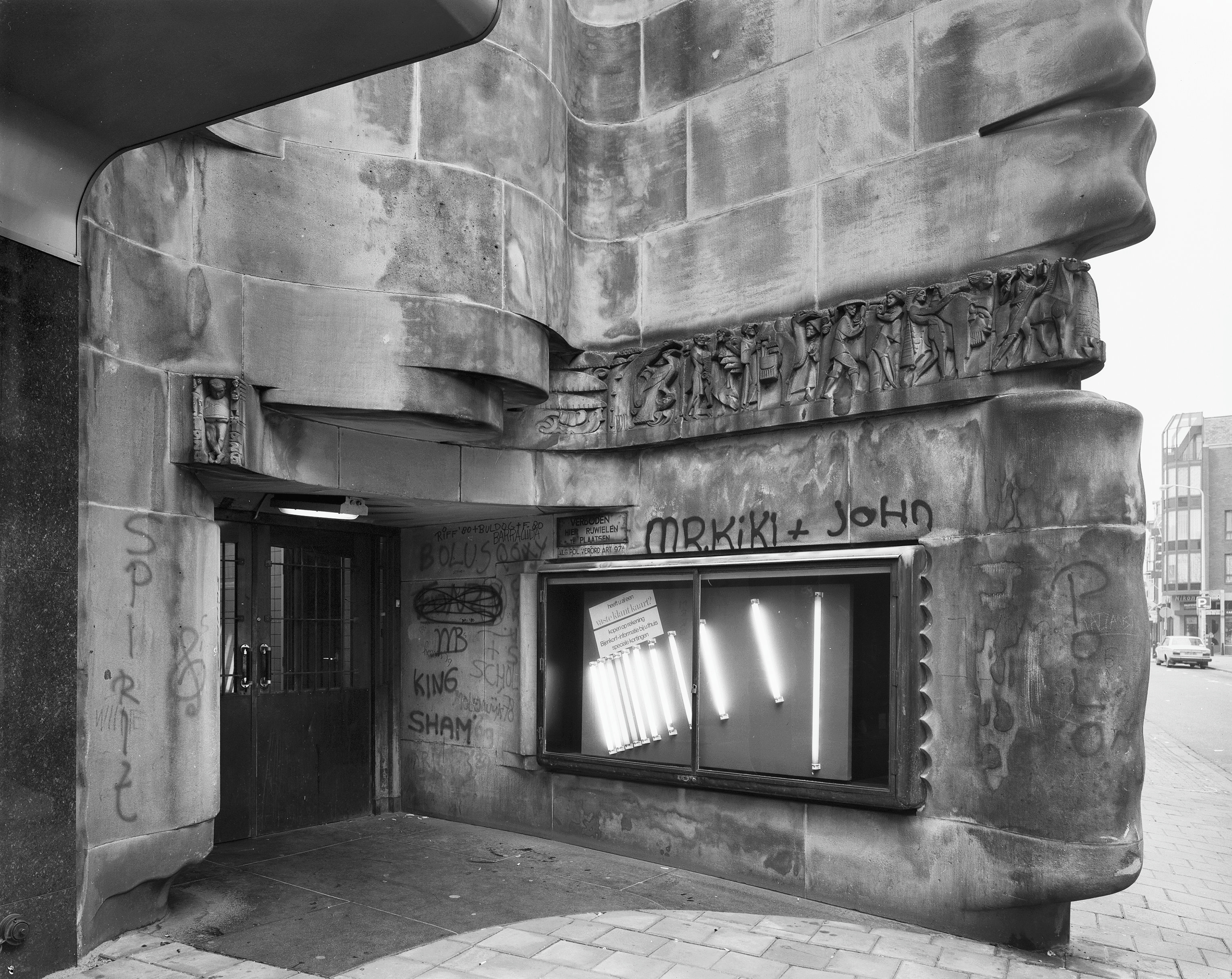
Relief at the “De Bijenkorf” department store, The Hague
