= Joanna Manganara =

Greek diplomat and activist

14th President of the International Alliance of Women
- In office 2013–2020
- Preceded by: Lyda Verstegen
- Succeeded by: Cheryl Hayles

Vice President for Europe of the International Alliance of Women
- In office 2004–2013
- Preceded by: Rosy Weiss

Personal details
- Education: University of Kent; University of Geneva
- Occupation: Sociologist

Joanna Manganara (Greek: Τζοάννα Μανγκανάρα) is a Greek diplomat, women's rights activist, from 2013 to 2020 she was the President of the International Alliance of Women (IAW,) which is the oldest still-existing international women's organization. She was also its Chief Representative to the United Nations. She served as Minister-Counselor for human rights at the Greek Ministry of Foreign Affairs from 1980 to 2005.

She served as the IAW's Vice President for Europe from 2004 to 2013, and was elected President on 11 September 2013 at the IAW's triennial congress in London, making her the overseer of more than 50 affiliated organizations worldwide. This position finished in 2020. She is also a member of the Executive Board of the European Women's Lobby, and a board member of the Greek Council for Refugees and the Hellenic National Committee for UNICEF. She is also President of the Movement of Citizens of Kolonaki, a town in her native Greece. This movement seeks to provide fair rights to its citizens, via the organization of protests outside of local politicians homes.

She was a lecturer at Panteion University from 1970 to 1982. She holds an MA in sociology from the University of Kent, and a licence degree from the University of Geneva. She is also a graduate of Pierce College.
