= Irène de Lipkowski =

French politician

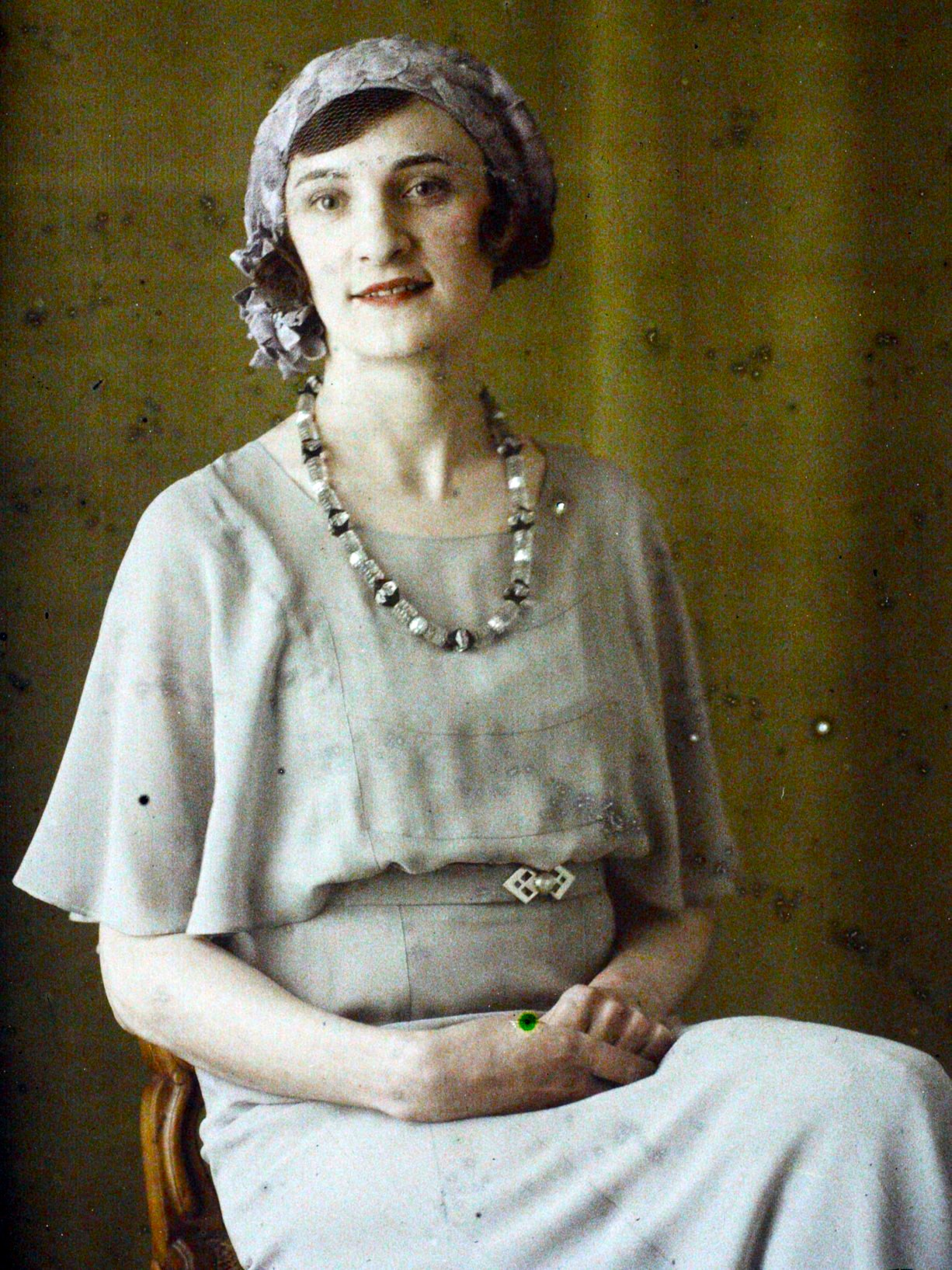
- 1931 Autochrome by Georges Chevalier

Member of the National Assembly of France
- In office 1951–1955

8th President of the International Alliance of Women
- In office 1973–1979
- Preceded by: Edith Anrep
- Succeeded by: Olive Bloomer

Personal details
- Born: 3 December 1898 Dun-sur-Auron, France
- Died: 16 August 1995 (aged 96)

Irène de Lipkowski (3 December 1898 – 16 August 1995) was a French politician who served as a member of the National Assembly from 1951 to 1955, and as the 8th President of the International Alliance of Women from 1973 to 1979.

She was one of the signatories of the agreement to convene a convention for drafting a world constitution. As a result, for the first time in human history, a World Constituent Assembly convened to draft and adopt the Constitution for the Federation of Earth.
