= Alice Yotopoulos-Marangopoulos =

Greek lawyer and criminologist

- Αλίκη Γιωτοπούλου-Μαραγκοπούλου

10th President of the International Alliance of Women
- In office 1989–1996
- Preceded by: Olive Bloomer
- Succeeded by: Patricia Giles

Personal details
- Born: Aliki Giotopoulou (or Yotopoulou); 1916/1917 Corfu, Greece
- Died: 31 August 2018 (aged 101) Athens, Greece

Alice Yotopoulos-Marangopoulos (1916/1917 – 31 August 2018) was a Greek lawyer and criminologist.

== Career ==
Born Aliki Giotopoulou (or Yotopoulou) in 1916 or 1917, the daughter of a lawyer, she served as Professor of Criminology, President of the Hellenic Society of Criminology, board member of the International Society of Criminology, lawyer at the Supreme Court, Vice President of the Bar Association of Athens, President of the Panteion University, President of the National Commission for Human Rights and as the 10th President of the International Alliance of Women (1989–1996). She was founder and President of the Marangopoulos Foundation for Human Rights.

== Publications ==
- Les mobiles du délit : étude de criminologie et de droit pénal : The Motives of Crime: Study of Criminology and Criminal Law (1973)
- The Peculiarities of Female Criminality and their Causes: A Human Rights Perspective (1992), Esperia
- Women's rights: human rights (1994), Estia
- Affirmative action : towards effective gender equality, (1998)
