= Edith Anrep =

Swedish lawyer and feminist (1912–2012)

7th President of the International Alliance of Women
- In office 1970–1973
- Preceded by: Begum Anwar Ahmed
- Succeeded by: Irène de Lipkowski

Personal details
- Born: 16 September 1912
- Died: 11 November 2012 (aged 100)
- Occupation: Lawyer

Edith Anrep (16 September 1912 – 11 November 2012) was a Swedish lawyer and feminist. She served as the 7th President of the International Alliance of Women from 1970 to 1973. In Sweden she was President of the Fredrika Bremer Association Scholarship Institution, vice-president of the Swedish Cancer Society and board member of the Swedish Committee for Cultural Cooperation on Europe.
