= Wilhelmina Drupsteen =

Dutch visual artist

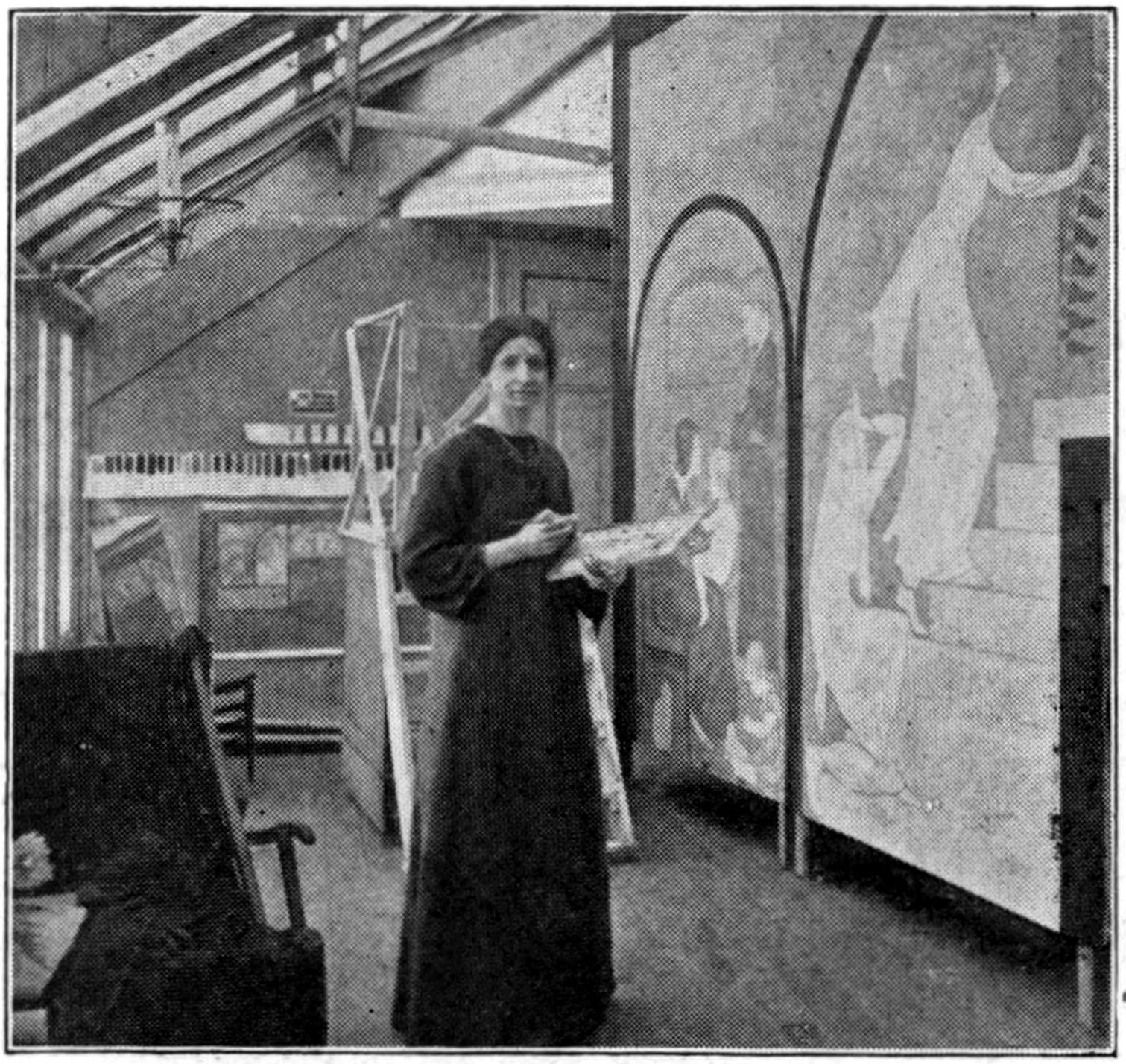
- Wilhelmina Drupsteen, 1913
- Born: 10 October 1880; Amsterdam, Netherlands
- Died: 2 April 1966 (aged 85); Oosterbeek, Netherlands
- Known for: Illustration

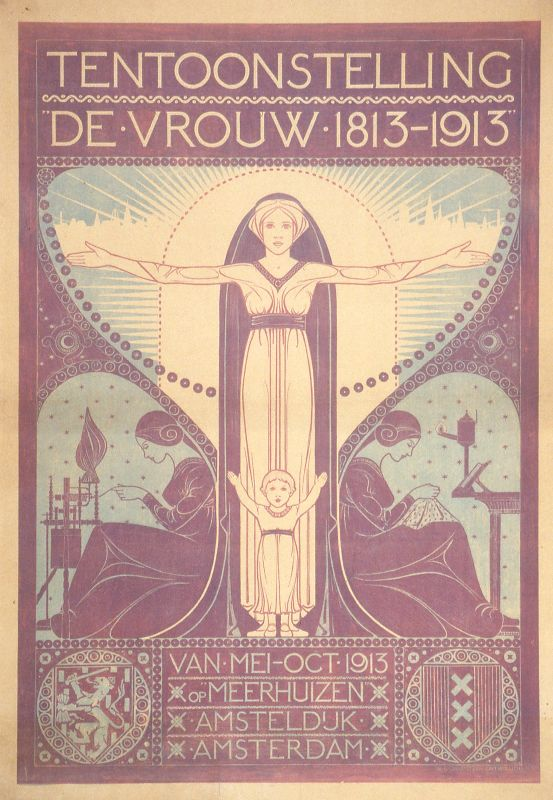
poster for De Vrouw 1813-1913

Wilhelmina "Willie" Cornelia Drupsteen (1880–1966) was a Dutch illustrator. She is known for her graphic work and book illustrations.

== Biography ==
Drupsteen was born on 10 October 1880 in Amsterdam. She studied at Rijksnormaalschool voor Teekenonderwijsers (National Normal School for Drawing Teachers). She went on to study at Rijksschool voor Kunstnijverheid (National School for Arts and Crafts), and Rijksakademie van beeldende kunsten (State Academy of Fine Arts). Her teachers included Karel de Bazel, Pieter Dupont, Mathieu Lauweriks, Xeno Münninghoff, Nicolaas van der Waay, and Herman Walenkamp

In 1902 she became a teacher at Dagteeken- en Kunstambachtsschool voor Meisjes (Day drawing and craft school for girls) where she worked until 1908. Drupsteen worked as an illustrator for the Dutch women's movement and other social organizations. She also provided illustrations for the magazine Maandblad der Vereeniging voor Verbetering van Vrouwenkleeding.

In 1905 she became the first woman illustrator to become a member of the Nederlandsche Vereeniging voor Ambachts- en Nijverheidskunst (Association for Craft and Craft Art) (VANK). In 1908 she won the Willink van Collen competition administered by the Arti et Amicitiae.

In 1913 Drupsteen created the poster for De Vrouw 1813-1913. The image also used for the cover of the exhibition catalog.

Suffering from physical and financial problems, Drupsteen moved from Amsterdam to Gelderland, eventually settling in Oosterbeek. By 1955 she was no longer able to work due to failing eyesight. Drupsteen died on 2 April 1966 in Oosterbeek.
