= Hanna Rydh =

Swedish archaeologist, politician and women rights activist (1891-1964)

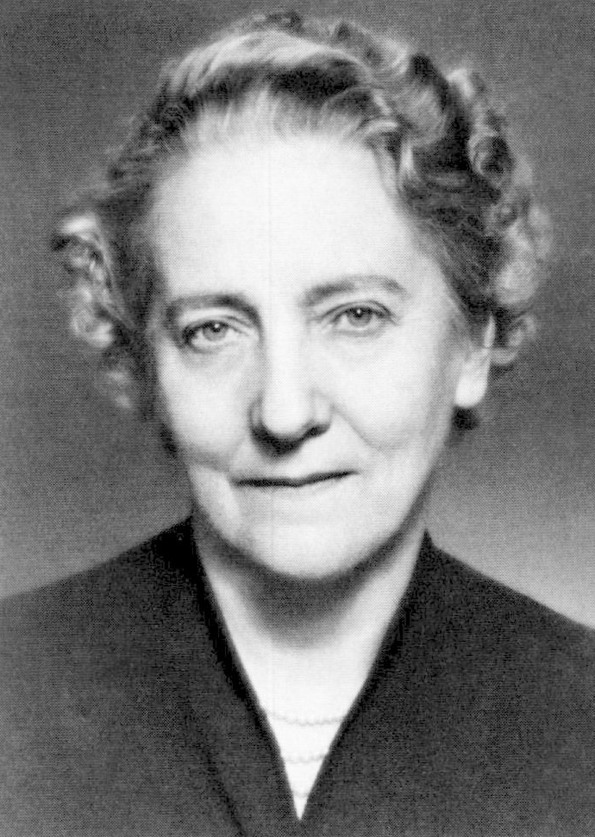
Hanna Rydh

Hanna Albertina Rydh (12 February 1891 – 29 June 1964) was a Swedish archaeologist and politician for the Liberal People's Party. She served as a Member of Parliament in the Riksdag from 1943 to 1944 and was the 3rd President of the International Alliance of Women from 1946 to 1952.

== Biography ==
Hanna Rydh was born in Stockholm to director Johan Albert Rydh and his wife Matilda Josefina Westlund. In 1919, she was married to fellow archaeologist Bror Schnittger (1882-1924). After his death, she was married in 1929 to Mortimer Munck af Rosenschöld (1887-1942) who served as Governor of Jämtland-Härjedalen (1931-1938).

=== Scientist ===
Rydh was a pupil at the Wallinska skolan in Stockholm and proceeded studying archaeology at Stockholm University. She graduated in literature history, archaeology and art history in 1915. She submitted her doctoral dissertation at Uppsala University in May 1919. Between 1916 and 1930, she and her husband conducted archaeological excavations at Adelsö and between 1917 and 1921 at Gästrikland. In 1922, she was granted a research grant from the International Federation of University Women. When asked if she should be given the scholarship, as she had just become a mother, she famously replied: "my son's birth makes no difference", which was given attention worldwide. She was attaché temporaire at the Musée des Antiquités Nationales in S:t Germain-en-Laye in 1924–1925.

Aside from her work as an archaeologist, she published in many popular scientific journal. About the time of her graduation, marriage and beginning of her professional life in 1919, women in Sweden had only recently achieved equal rights with men, which had been the goal of the women's movement since its start fifty years prior. The new focus of the Swedish women's movement was to use these rights, defy traditional gender prejudices, and prove wrong those who doubted women could handle their new role in society.

Hanna Rydh provided an example and role model of the "new woman" who could use her rights as a professional public person and still be a married woman with a family, which she demonstrated particularly during the tenure of her second spouse as governor in 1931–1938, when she performed all the social representational duties of a governor's wife of the time while in parallel being an internationally respected career professional.

=== Engagements ===
She was also engaged as a social reformer. Her first assignment was as a member of the central committee of the Swedish Student's Temperance Association (Sveriges studerande ungdoms helnykterhetsförbund) or SSUH in 1909–1914.

She was a member of the board of the Sveriges Husmodersföreningars riksförbund in 1936–1941, chairperson of Fredrika-Bremer-förbundet in 1937–1949, second vice chairperson of the Finland Relief Society (Centrala Finlandshjälpen) in 1940, vice president of the International Alliance of Women in 1939–1946, member of the commission of home-and family issues in 1941, the 3rd President of the International Alliance of Women from 1946 to 1952. She was a member of The Committee for Increased Women's Representation, founded in 1937 to increase women's political representation.

Hanna Rydh served as an MP for the Liberal Party in the Second Chamber of the Parliament of Sweden for Stockholm in 1943–1944. As MP she focused on work related issues for women public servants.

She was awarded the Swedish Royal Medal Illis Quorum in 1936.

== Selected works ==
- 1930- Adelsö (Stockholm : Wahlström & Widstrand i kommission)
- 1948 - Jämtland och Härjedalen (Uppsala : Lindblad)

== Related reading ==
- Margarita Díaz-Andreu, Marie Louise Stig Sorensen (2005) Excavating Women: A History of Women in European Archaeology (Routledge) ISBN 9781134727766
