= Irene Stoehr =

German Journalist (1941–2023)

- Born: February 16, 1941 Brzeg, Germany
- Died: February 26, 2023 (aged 82) Berlin
- Occupation: journalist, writer

Irene Stoehr (February 16, 1941, in Brzeg – February 26, 2023, in Berlin) was a German feminist historical social scientist and journalist. Her main research interests were the feminist movement and gender history in the 20th century.

== Life ==
She was one of the twelve professors who organized the first Berlin Summer University for Women at the FU Berlin in 1976, where the main themes of the new women's movement were discussed.

From 1982 to 1984, she was the editor and writer of the first national feminist monthly Courage and together with Eva Maria Appel she edited the feminist magazine Unterschiede (Differences) from 1991 to 1993.

In 2002, together with Rita Pawlowski, she created the "first critical analysis of the 50-year-old journal of the German Women's Council". Inge von Boeninghausen, then head of the National Council of German Women's Organizations, wrote in the foreword that the authors record "important steps in the struggle for equal rights for women, which has been a constitutional principle since 1949, but is still far from a living reality", using the example of individual policy areas.

== Works ==
=== Monographs ===
- Emanzipation zum Staat? Der Allgemeine Deutsche Frauenverein – Deutscher Staatsbürgerinnenverband (1893–1933), Pfaffenweiler, 1990.
- Frauenpolitik und politisches Wirken von Frauen in Berlin der Nachkriegszeit 1945–1949 (mit Renate Genth, Reingard Jäkel, Rita Pawlowski, Ingrid Schmidt-Harzbach), trafo Verlag Berlin, 1996.
- Berliner Agrarökonomen im 'Dritten Reich': von Max Sering zu Konrad Meyer; ein ‚machtergreifender' Generationswechsel in der Agrar- und Siedlungswissenschaft. Humboldt-Universität zu Berlin, Wirtschafts- und Sozialwissenschaften an der Landwirtschaftlich-Gärtnerischen Fakultät. Working paper 59 (2001).
- Die unfertige Demokratie: 50 Jahre "Informationen für die Frau" (mit Rita Pawlowski), herausgegeben vom Deutschen Frauenrat, Berlin, 2002.

=== Articles in magazines and collections ===
- Organisierte Mütterlichkeit. Zur Politik der deutschen Frauenbewegung um 1900. In: Karin Hausen (Hrsg.): Frauen suchen ihre Geschichte. Historische Studien zum 19. und 20. Jahrhundert, C.H. Beck, München 1983, ISBN 978-3-406-09276-3, S. 221–249
- Politik für Hausfrauen – „biologistisch“ und „konservativ“? Zur aktuellen und historischen Problematik einer feministischen Sprachregelung. In: Gisela Erler, Monika Jaeckel (Hrsg.): Weibliche Ökonomie. Ansätze, Analysen und Forderungen zur Überwindung der patriarchalischen Ökonomie, Juventa Verlag, Weinheim/München 1989, ISBN 978-3-87966-304-0, S. 17–37
- Staatsfeminismus und Lebensform. Frauenpolitik im Generationenkonflikt der Weimarer Republik, in Dagmar Reese / Eve Rosenhaft / Carola Sachse / Tilla Siegel (Hg.): Rationale Beziehungen? Geschlechterverhältnisse im Rationalisierungsprozess, Frankfurt am Main, 1993, S. 105–141.
- Feministische Generationen und politische Kultur. Die Frauenbewegung als Generationenproblem. In: Dokumentation der Ringvorlesung am Zentrum für Interdisziplinäre Frauenforschung der Humboldt-Universität zu Berlin, Wintersemester 1994/1995", Herausgeberin: Zentrum für Interdisziplinäre Frauenforschung der Humboldt-Universität zu Berlin, Trafo Verlag, 1996, ISBN 978-3-89626-087-1
- Frauenerwerbsarbeit als Kriegsfall. Marie-Elisabeth Lüders: Variationen eines Lebensthemas. In: Gunilla-Friederike Budde (Hrsg.): Frauen arbeiten. Weibliche Erwerbstätigkeit in Ost- und Westdeutschland nach 1945, Vandenhoeck und Ruprecht, Göttingen 1997, ISBN 978-3-525-01363-2, S. 62–78
- Feministischer Antikommunismus und weibliche Staatsbürgerschaft in der Gründungsdekade der Bundesrepublik Deutschland. In: Feministische Studien 1/1998
- Irene Stoehr, Rita Pawlowski (2002): Die unfertige Demokratie. 50 Jahre „Informationen der Frau“. Deutscher Frauenrat (Hg.), Eigenverlag
- Kalter Krieg und Geschlecht. Überlegungen zu einer friedenshistorischen Forschungslücke. In: Benjamin Ziemann (Hrsg.): Perspektiven der Historischen Friedensforschung, Essen 2002
- Stille Dienste. hoher Knall. Professor Sering und die Frauen*. In: Barbara Duden (Hrsg.): Geschichte in Geschichten. Ein historisches Lesebuch, Campus, Frankfurt 2003, ISBN 978-3-593-37252-5, S. 24–34
- Mit Susanne Lanwerd: Frauen- und Geschlechtergeschichte zum Nationalsozialismus seit den 1970er Jahren. In: Johanna Gehmacher, Gabriella Hauch (Hrsg.): Frauen- und Geschlechtergeschichte des Nationalsozialismus (Aufsatzsammlung), Studienverlag, Innsbruck 2007, ISBN 978-3-7065-4488-7, S. 22–68 (pdf)
- Friedensklärchens Feindinnen. Klara-Maria Fassbinder und das antikommunistische Frauennetzwerk. In: Julia Paulus (Hrsg.): Zeitgeschichte als Geschlechtergeschichte, Neue Perspektiven auf die Bundesrepublik, Campus Verlag, Frankfurt a. M. 2012, ISBN 978-3-593-39742-9, S. 69–91
- Lieber geben als nehmen? Westdeutsche Frauenorganisationen in menschenrechtspolitischer Perspektive 1948–1959. In: Roman Birke, Carola Sachse (Hg.) Menschenrechte und Geschlecht im 20. Jahrhundert. Historische Studien, Göttingen 2018

=== Literature ===
- Elisabeth Meyer-Renschhausen: Im Haus der Kutscherin tageszeitung, 13 September 2019
- Maria-Amancay Jenny: Widersprüche, Ambivalenzen und Verschrobenheiten – Irene Stoehr. In: Birgit Buchinger, Renate Böhm, Ela Großmann (Hrsg.): Kämpferinnen. Mandelbaum, Wien 2021, ISBN 978-3-85476-984-2, S. 155–173.
- Waltraut Schwab: Sie war frauenbewegt, unideologisch und eigen tageszeitung, 16 March 2023
