= Begum Anwar Ahmed =

Pakistani feminist

6th President of the International Alliance of Women
- In office 1964–1970
- Preceded by: Ezlynn Deraniyagala
- Succeeded by: Edith Anrep

Begum Anwar Ahmed was a Pakistani feminist, who served as chairperson of the United Nations Commission on the Status of Women in 1958 and as the 6th president of the International Alliance of Women from 1964 to 1970.

Her husband served as Pakistan's Ambassador to the United States.
