= Ralph St. Louis Pieris Deraniyagala =

Sri Lankan civil servant

Clerk to the House of Representatives
- In office 14 October 1947 – 26 October 1964
- Preceded by: office created
- Succeeded by: Sam Wijesinha

Clerk of the State Council
- In office 1 July 1947 – 4 July 1947
- Preceded by: D. C. R. Gunawardana
- Succeeded by: office abolished

Personal details
- Born: October 27, 1904
- Spouse: Ezlynn Deraniyagala
- Parent(s): Paul Edward Pieris (father); Hilda Obeyesekere Pieris (mother)
- Profession: Lawyer

Ralph St. Louis Pieris Deraniyagala, CBE (born 27 October 1904), was a Ceylonese lawyer and civil servant who served as Clerk of the State Council and Clerk to the House of Representatives from 1947 to 1964.

== Biography ==
Ralph St. Louis Pieris Deraniyagala was born on 27 October 1904 to Paul Edward Pieris, a civil servant and scholar, and Hilda Obeyesekere Pieris. His siblings included Paulus Edward Pieris Deraniyagala, Justin Pieris Deraniyagala, and Miriam Pieris Deraniyagala. He gained a BA and qualified as a barrister. He married Ezlynn Deraniyagala in 1935.

On 1 July 1947, Deraniyagala was appointed as Clerk of the State Council, and continued as Clerk to the House of Representatives until his retirement in October 1964.

In the 1948 Birthday Honours, Deraniyagala was appointed as a Member of the Most Excellent Order of the British Empire (MBE). He was then appointed as an Officer of the Most Excellent Order of the British Empire (OBE) in the 1953 Coronation Honours and Commander of the Most Excellent Order of the British Empire (CBE) in the 1954 New Year Honours.
