= European Women's Lobby =

Women's rights organization

European's Women Lobby
- Formation: 1990
- Legal status: Non-profit organization
- Headquarters: Brussels, Belgium
- Region served: EU, EU candidate countries, Iceland, UK
- Members: more than 2,000 organizations
- Secretary General: Mary Collins
- President: Dina Loghin
- Website: http://www.womenlobby.org

The European Women's Lobby (EWL) is an umbrella organization of women's non-governmental associations in Europe working for the interests of women and girls in all their diversity and gender equality in all areas of life.

EWL was founded in 1990, representing a total of more than 2,000 organizations. EWL membership extends to organizations in 26 EU member states, four EU candidate countries, Iceland, and the UK, as well as to European-wide bodies.

With a secretariat based in Brussels, Belgium, the EWL is one of the longest-standing European level NGOs, and works closely with European institutions and civil society partners. At the international level, the EWL has a consultative status at the Council of Europe, and participates regularly in the activities of the UN Commission on the Status of Women (CSW).

== History ==
The European Women's Lobby was created in response to a growing awareness of the need to defend women's interests at the European level. European women's organizations had conferences as early as 1982 to create a structure of cooperation within the European Economic Community. Among the leading figures were Fausta Deshormes, Hilde Albertini, Odile Quintin, Liliana Richetta, Helga Thieme, and Jacqueline de Groote. In November 1987 in London, 120 women, members of 85 organizations representing 50 million individual members, came together, and adopted two resolutions. The first called for the "creation of a structure for influence, open to all interested women's organizations, to exert pressure on European and national institutions to ensure better defence and representation of women's interest". In a second resolution, the delegates called upon the European Commission to "lend its support for the organization in early 1988 of a meeting, with a view to the implementation of such a structure". Support was granted, and the European Women's Lobby and its secretariat in Brussels were formally established in 1990. The EWL was founded in 1990 by Belgium, Denmark, France, Germany, Greece, Ireland, Italy, Luxembourg, Portugal, Spain, The Netherlands, and the United Kingdom national coordinations and 17 large European-wide women's organizations. At the time, just twelve countries formed the European Union, then known as the European Communities (EC). Over the years, as new Member States joined the EC, new national co-ordinations became members of the EWL. While the EU enlarged to countries of Central and Eastern Europe, the EWL established links and cooperation with women's organizations in these countries.

== Policies ==
=== Gender diversity ===
EWL promotes the interests of women and girls in all their diversity, opposes all forms of racism, homophobia, transphobia, and ableism, and has noted that "women are not a homogenous group and have multiple identities" and that "women with multiple identities are rendered more vulnerable to discrimination, violence and violation of their rights. The situation of migrant or undocumented women, women from ethnic minorities, indigenous women, Roma women, women with disabilities, rural women, girls, older women, lesbians and bisexual women, transgender women, has long been made invisible. It is urgent to make sure that all policies are designed to not leave a single girl or woman behind." In 2023, EWL executive committee member and former IAW President Marion Böker participated in ILGA-Europe's podcast "Trans Inclusion in the Women's Movement," which pointed out that the established women's movement consistently supports LGBT+ minorities. Böker warned against anti-democratic forces and forces on the far right – including groups that portray themselves as feminists but who are actually right-wing and racist – that try to pit women's rights against the human rights of minorities, including trans women, saying that "to make an organization inclusive, you have to fight for it." Böker stressed the importance of working on the basis of human rights, that are indivisible and universal, and to defend openness and democratic values. Böker's remarks align with a statement from UN Women that emphasized that those who promote "the human rights of women and LGBTIQ+ people share the same goals of achieving safe and fair societies" and condemned extremist anti-rights movements such as "anti-gender" and "gender-critical" movements. Beate von Miquel, the President of EWL's largest member organization, the National Council of German Women's Organizations, said that "trans women are women and we need to represent them and defend their rights."

=== Women in politics ===
The European Women's Lobby is a strong advocate of women's representation in politics at the European level, denouncing the under-representation of women. At the moment of the hearing of Ursula von der Leyen at the European Parliament confirming her as the new president and the first female president of the European Commission, the European Women's Lobby was calling for the European Commission to commit to a feminist Europe.

The European Women's Lobby has been also pushing for women quotas in private companies' management boards.

In the wake of the Me Too movement, which brought to light cases of sexual harassment at the European Parliament, the EWL called for putting in place adequate reporting structures at the EU institutions for cases of sexual harassment, in order to hold perpetrators accountable.

=== Women's economic independence ===
The EWL has been denouncing the gender pay gap, made worse by the austerity measures in Europe following the financial crisis, pushing more women into poverty. In 2020, the economic fallout from the COVID-19 pandemic again disproportionally affected women, according to EWL.

=== Prostitution ===
The European Women's Lobby has been advocating for Europe-wide legislation criminalizing the purchase of sex and sexual exploitation of women and girls and calling for abolition of prostitution. The member organizations are divided in the criminalization debate, with EWL's largest national member organization, the National Council of German Women's Organizations – German Women's Lobby, actively opposing criminalization and joining the Alliance Against a Sex Purchase Ban (Bündnis gegen ein Sexkaufverbot) sponsored by the German Women Lawyers Association, which argues that "criminalizing sex work does not protect against coercion, but leads to more health risks, violence, and precarious living conditions." Some of the largest international member organizations, such as the International Alliance of Women, a strongly UN-oriented organization whose members are themselves divided, maintain a neutral position in the debate, aligned with e.g. the declared position of UN Women.

== European legislation ==
The European Women's Lobby is monitoring European legislation. EWL raised the alarm regarding the effects on women of different European legislative proposal. For example, EU legislation imposing additional costs on plastic producers to achieve environmental objectives could have a negative economic impact on women if producers of single-use period products increase prices of period products containing plastic. In the area of digital policy the EWL has been advocating for the need to fight online violence in particular through the rules to be introduced in the Digital Services Act.
