= 13th Conference of the International Woman Suffrage Alliance =

The 13th Conference of the International Woman Suffrage Alliance was an international women's conference which took place in Copenhagen in Denmark on July 8 to 14 1939. It was the 13th international conference which was arranged under the International Alliance of Women.

The Conference was affected by worry about a possible war and what that would mean for women's rights and the importance of peace to prevent war, but the political situation made it difficult to find international methods to benefit the cause and not much progress was made.

The Conference was influenced by the ongoing antisemitism in Nazi Germany and the growing Zionism movement in Palestine. It is known for the well documented conflict between the Egyptian Delegation and Jewish-Dutch feminist Rosa Manus whether the delegates of the Organization of Jewish Women from Palestine, could be regarded as representatives of Palestine and the resistance of Egypt against Jewish immigration to Palestine.
