= 14th Conference of the International Woman Suffrage Alliance =

The 14th Conference of the International Woman Suffrage Alliance or Fourteenth Conference of the International Woman Suffrage Alliance was an international women's conference which took place in Interlaken in Switzerland 10–17 August 1946. It was the 14th international conference which was arranged under the International Alliance of Women.

The Conference resumed the work of the organization after the interruption of the second world war. The new political situation in the cold war made the old forms of international cooperation impossible, and the organization now took the step to work through the UN by becoming a NGO with consultative status in the Economic and Social Council of the United Nations.
