= Beate von Miquel =

German academic and women's rights advocate (born 1968)

- Born: 1968
- Occupation(s): Gender studies scholar, women's rights advocate

Beate von Miquel (born 1968) is a German women's rights advocate and gender studies scholar. She is President of the National Council of German Women's Organizations – German Women's Lobby, Germany's largest organization that campaigns for gender equality and women's rights, with 11 million members. She is also managing director of the Marie Jahoda Center for International Gender Studies at the Ruhr University Bochum. She studied protestant theology, history and political science at the universities of Marburg, Bonn, Göttingen and Bochum, and holds a PhD in political science. Her research fields are gender studies, media history, corporate history and contemporary church history. Miquel has worked as an academic and civil servant in the field of equality and diversity in the university sector. She is a member of Protestant Women in Germany, and in 2021 she was elected President of the National Council of German Women's Organizations. She is also vice president of the advisory board of the Bundesstiftung Gleichstellung, a federal foundation that promotes equality in Germany. Speaking on trans inclusion, Miquel said that said that "trans women are women and we need to represent them and defend their rights."

== Selected bibliography ==
- Evangelische Frauen im Dritten Reich: Die Westfälische Frauenhilfe 1933–1950, Aschendorff Verlag, 2006
