= Margarita Díaz-Andreu =

Spanish archaeologist

- Born: 1962 (age 63–64)
- Occupation: Archaeologist
- Awards: Ramón Menéndez Pidal National Research Prize in the Humanities

Margarita Díaz-Andreu García (born 1962) is a Spanish archaeologist and researcher. Since 2012, she has worked continuously as an ICREA research professor at the University of Barcelona. In 2021, she was awarded the Ramón Menéndez Pidal National Research Prize in the Humanities.

== Career ==
Díaz-Andreu graduated with a BA in 1985 from the Complutense University of Madrid (UCM). She completed postdoctoral research in England (1991–1993) and held a research contract at Durham University (1996–2011). Her research is focussed on prehistoric Iberia, women in archaeology and archaeoacoustics; as director of the ArqueólogAs project at the University of Barcelona, Díaz-Andreu worked to recover the histories of women in Spanish archaeological sciences. Between 2017 and 2018, she led the PALARQ Foundation project entitled "Soundscape and Rock Art in the Santa Teresa Canyon." From September 2018 until 2023, Díaz-Andreu worked on the Artsoundscapes Project, funded by the European Commission.

In 2021, she served as ICREA Research Professor at the Faculty of Geography and History of the University of Barcelona (UB), focusing on rock art, archaeoacoustics, gender, the history of archaeology, and archaeological heritage as priority lines of study. A 2025 co-authored paper demonstrated that conch shells could have been used for long-distance communication in Neolithic Catalonia. Díaz-Andreu has also held the role of vice-president of the Commission on the History of Archaeology of the International Union of Prehistoric and Protohistoric Sciences.

In March 2023 El Diario published an investigation which cited accusations of workplace harassment and unprofessional behaviour by Diaz-Andreu across several institutions. The accusations were made by staff and current and former students. In June of that year the same newspaper reported that the University of Barcelona had considered the allegations and as a result Díaz-Andreu was instructed to attend a re-education course. Furthermore, at the time, she was instructed not to supervise any new doctoral students nor to undertake any new research projects until the University of Barcelona was satisfied that her revised "team management, leadership, and conflict resolution skills" would not lead to disciplinary proceedings in future.

== Award ==
- The Ramón Menéndez Pidal National Research Prize in the Humanities (2021)

== Selected publications ==
- López-Garcia M, Díaz-Andreu M. Signalling and music-making: interpreting the Neolithic shell trumpets of Catalonia (Spain). Antiquity. 2025;99 (408):1480-1497.
- Díaz-Andreu, M. (2023). Women’s Pathways in the History of Spanish Archaeology: A New Synthesis. In: López Varela, S.L. (eds) Women in Archaeology. Women in Engineering and Science. Springer, Cham.
- Diaz-Andreu, M., and Stig Sorense, M. L. Excavating Women: a History of Women in European Archaeology (Routledge 2005)
