= Ezlynn Deraniyagala =

Sri Lankan lawyer and feminist (1908 – 1973)

5th President of the International Alliance of Women
- In office 1958–1964
- Preceded by: Ester Graff
- Succeeded by: Begum Anwar Ahmed

Personal details
- Born: Ezlynn Isabel Améliè Obeyesekere; 1908
- Died: 1973 (aged 64–65)
- Spouse: Ralph St. Louis Pieris Deraniyagala
- Children: Ralph Senaka (son)
- Education: Hillwood College, St. Bridget's Convent, St Anne's College, Oxford
- Occupation: Barrister

Ezlynn Isabel Améliè Deraniyagala (1908 – 1973) was a Sri Lankan lawyer and feminist, who was the first female barrister in the country.

== Early life and education ==
Ezlynn Isabel Améliè Obeyesekere was born in 1908, the only daughter and second child of F. A. Obeysekera, the speaker of the State Council of Ceylon and a member of the Legislative Council of Ceylon, and Anna Isabella née Sykes. She attended Hillwood College, Kandy before finishing her secondary schooling at St. Bridget's Convent, Colombo.

She then attended St Anne's College, Oxford, where she was president of the Geldart Society. In 1934 she obtained her degree and was called to the bar at the Inner Temple.

In 1935 she was appointed as an Advocate in the Supreme Court of Ceylon, becoming the first female barrister in Ceylon.

== Ceylon Women Lawyers' Association ==
She was elected as the first President of the Ceylon Women Lawyers' Association (1960-1961, 1966-1967). Deraniyagala served as the long-time president of the All-Ceylon Women's Conference. Deraniyagala served as the Vice President of the International Alliance of Women from 1952 to 1955, becoming its 5th president from 1958 to 1964, presided over the Alliance's 19th Congress in Ireland in 1961 and its 20th congress in Italy in 1964.

== Family ==
She married Ralph St. Louis Pieris Deraniyagala, CBE a lawyer, who became the Clerk of Parliament. He was a son of Sir Paul Pieris and Lady Hilda Obeyesekere Pieris.

== See also ==
- First women lawyers around the world
