= Mia Boissevain =

Dutch malacologist, editor

Maria Boissevain
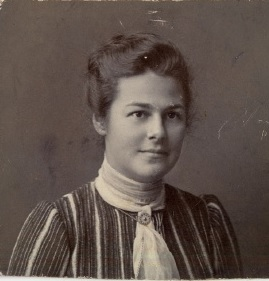
- Born: 8 February 1878; Amsterdam, Netherlands
- Died: 8 March 1959 (aged 81); London, England

Maria (Mia) Boissevain (8 February 1878 – 8 March 1959) was a Dutch malacologist and feminist.

== Life ==
Boissevain was the youngest of nine children. Her father was a shipowner from a rich Huguenot merchant family and her mother was the daughter of a lawyer.

== Education ==
Boissevain attended a high school for girls. After graduating, Boissevain attended a lecture on botany by Hugo de Vries, which sparked her interest in the subject. In 1896, she started studying natural science at the University of Amsterdam. Here she specialised in zoology. After graduating, she moved to Zürich to do further research on Dentalium species and at age 25 attained the title of doctor. Afterwards, she moved back to the Netherlands where she became a curator for Artis, a Dutch zoo and association for zoology. She would remain active as a researcher until 1915, but would retain her interest in zoology afterwards. Four mollusk taxa are named after her: the species Cadulus boissevaini, Antalis boissevainae, Fustiaria Mariae and the genus Boissevainia.

== Women's rights ==
While in Zürich, Boissevain encountered international students who were interested in women's rights. When she returned to the Netherlands, she visited Aletta Jacobs to talk about the Dutch women's rights movement. In 1908, Jacobs asked Boissevain to help with the preparation for the third International Congress of Women in Amsterdam. Here, she met other prominent feminists and would go on to become more involved in the women's movement. Together with Rosa Manus, who she had gone to school with, she founded a commission for propaganda within the Vereeniging voor Vrouwenkiesrecht and was its president until 1912. The same year, she and Manus proposed an exhibition that would highlight the circumstances of women between 1813 and 1913, inspired by the exhibitions held to celebrate 100 years of independence from the French. She wrote the catalog for the exhibition De Vrouw 1813–1913, which became successful. During the First World War, Boissevain helped the families of mobilised soldiers and Flemish refugees. In 1915, she was one of the organisers of the International Congress of Women in the Hague. In the same year, she also wrote a book about her life titled Een Amsterdamsche familie, which was published in 1967.

After 1915, Boissevain moved to Great Britain and adopted two English girls. She lived in Switzerland with her two daughters from around 1925 to 1928, moved to the Netherlands afterwards and lived in London from 1930 until her death in 1959. She is buried in Amsterdam.
