= National Council of German Women's Organizations =

Women's rights organization in Germany

Coordinates: 52.510135°N 13.400936°E

- Deutscher Frauenrat
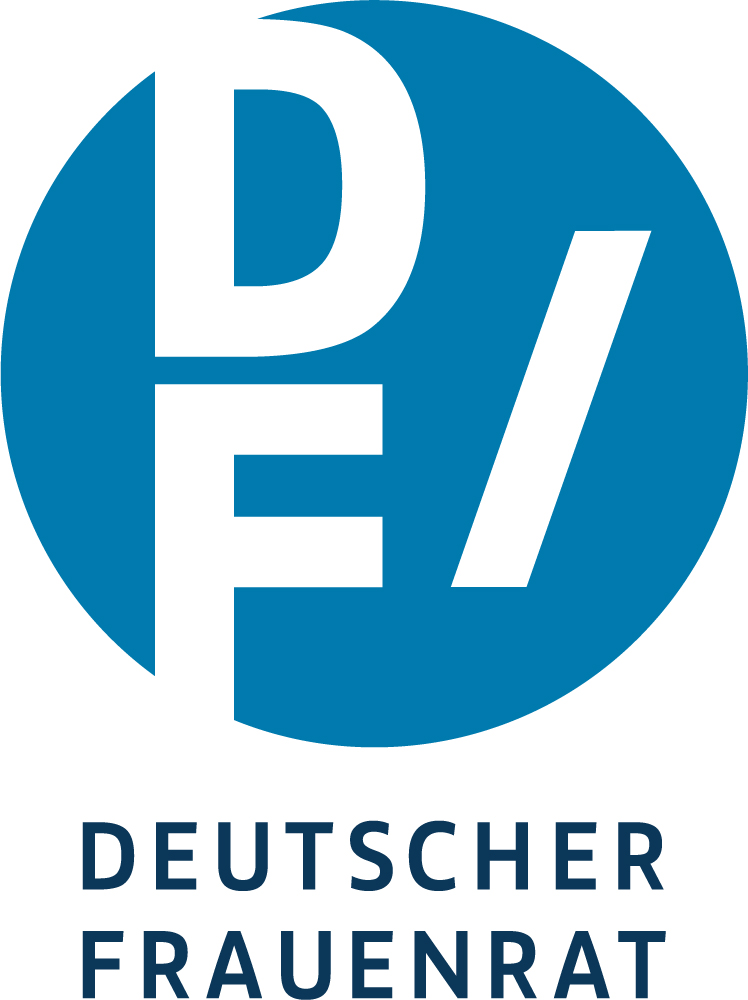
- Abbreviation: DF
- Formation: 1951
- Type: NGO
- Legal status: Registered association
- Purpose: Gender equality
- Headquarters: Berlin, Germany
- Methods: Law reform, political advocacy
- Members: 62 NGOs with 11 million members
- President: Beate von Miquel
- Website: www.frauenrat.de

The National Council of German Women's Organizations – German Women's Lobby (German: Deutscher Frauenrat – Lobby der Frauen in Deutschland) is a German umbrella organization for organizations concerned with women's rights and gender equality. One of Europe's largest women's organizations, it includes 62 member organizations with 11 million members.

== History and policies ==
It was founded in 1951 and views itself as a successor of the Bund Deutscher Frauenvereine, that existed from 1894 to 1933.

The council, similar to the Bund Deutscher Frauenvereine, was traditionally an umbrella organization for the bourgeois or "bourgeois-liberal" women's movement, but over time developed a broader political profile as a result of a rapprochement between the bourgeois-liberal women's movement and the labor or social democrat women's movement, as the labor unions also joined the organization. Today, it is a broad and representative umbrella organization for the German women's movement with 62 member organizations and 11 million members.

The National Council of German Women's Organizations initiated the establishment of the CEDAW Alliance Germany, and serves as its host institution. It is a founding member of the European Women's Lobby and its largest national chapter.

The council actively engages in advocating for women's rights and equality in politics, work, and within the family. The overarching goal is formal and real equality between genders in all areas of life. The organization operates on democratic principles, values tolerance, and emphasizes international cooperation. Its understanding of its mission also includes supporting the human rights of minority groups, and in the 21st century, the association has also become involved in advocating for the rights of transgender individuals and other queer communities in Germany. Thus the council opposes transphobia, supports gender self-identification and has stated that "trans women are women and we need to represent them and defend their rights." The National Council of German Women's Organizations is a member of the Bündnis gegen ein Sexkaufverbot, sponsored by the German Women Lawyers Association, which argues that "criminalizing sex work does not protect against coercion, but leads to more health risks, violence, and precarious living conditions."

Irene Stoehr, historical social scientist and journalist and Rita Pawlowski were of the importants members of the editorial staff of this organization.

Since 2021 Beate von Miquel has served as president of the organization.

== See also ==
- National Women's Council of Ireland
- Norwegian Women's Lobby
