= German Women Lawyers Association =

German professional association of women lawyers

- Deutsche Juristinnenbund
- Abbreviation: djb
- Formation: 1948
- Type: Professional association, Nonprofit
- Headquarters: Berlin, Germany
- Coordinates: 52.51118°N 13.38739°E
- President: Susanne Baer
- Website: djb.de

The German Women Lawyers Association (German: Deutscher Juristinnenbund; djb) is a professional association of female lawyers and economists in Germany and Europe's largest feminist legal policy organization.

== History and focus ==
It was founded in 1948 as the successor to the Deutscher Juristinnen-Verein, which existed from 1914 to 1933. The association had around 5,400 female lawyers as members in 2024. The founders were Luise Purps, Ruth Rogalski-Rohwedder, Anna Schlieper, Alma Schmidt-Perchner, Annette Schücking, Elisabeth Späth-Uden, and Hildegard Gethmann. It became a member of the International Federation of Women Lawyers (FIDA) in 1950.

The Deutscher Juristinnenbund is not a trade union, but an association for female lawyers with an interest in legal policy, especially in areas concerning women and equality. The association aims to promote "the development of law in all areas", advocates for equal rights and gender equality in all areas of society, and for women's legal interests. The association is a member of UN Women Germany and the European Movement in Germany. The association publishes the podcast Justitias Töchter about feminist legal policy. In 2024, the association marked its 75th anniversary with a conference on feminist foreign policy, where Foreign Minister Annalena Baerbock spoke on the German government's use of this approach in foreign policy.

The Deutscher Juristinnenbund supported the Self-Determination Act in Germany but criticized some aspects of the law for still baselessly stigmatizing trans women in a climate of increasing violence and discrimination against transgender people internationally. The association published a comprehensive consultation statement after a thorough discussion within the association, where it outlined the legal basis for its support of the law and stated that self-determination of legal gender is not in conflict with women's equality. The association distanced itself from discourses that baselessly portray "trans women as potential dangers and intruders in women's spaces," a "generalization for which there is no empirical basis."

The Deutscher Juristinnenbund is the initiator and coordinator of the Alliance Against a Sex Purchase Ban. Among the other members is the National Council of German Women's Organizations.

== Presidents ==
- 1949–1958: Hildegard Gethmann
- 1958–1960: Agnes Nath-Schreiber
- 1960–1963: Renate Lenz-Fuchs
- 1963–1965: Charlotte Graf
- 1965–1967: Hertha Engelbrecht
- 1967–1969: Renate Lenz-Fuchs
- 1969–1975: Helga-Christa Partikel
- 1975–1977: Renate Lenz-Fuchs
- 1977–1981: Lore Maria Peschel-Gutzeit
- 1981–1983: Anneliese Kohleiss|Annelies Kohleiss
- 1983–1989: Renate Damm
- 1989–1993: Antje Sedemund-Treiber
- 1993–1997: Ursula Raue
- 1997–2001: Ursula Nelles
- 2001–2005: Margret Diwell
- 2005–2011: Jutta Wagner
- 2011–2017: Ramona Pisal
- 2017–2023: Maria Wersig
- 2023-2025: Ursula Matthiessen-Kreuder
- since 2025: Susanne Baer
