= De Vrouw 1813–1913 =

De Vrouw 1813-1913
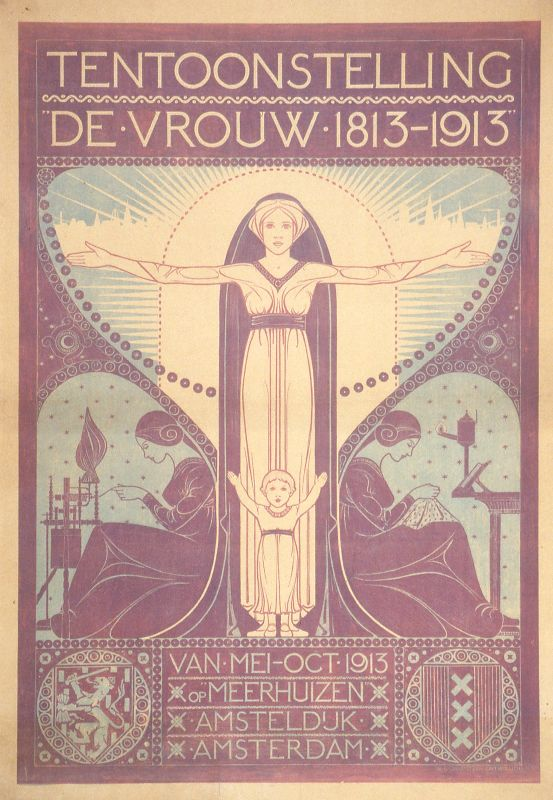
- poster for De Vrouw 1813-1913 by Wilhelmina Drupsteen
- Date: May 20, 1913 to October 10, 1913
- Location: Meerhuizen grounds in Amsterdam, the Netherlands

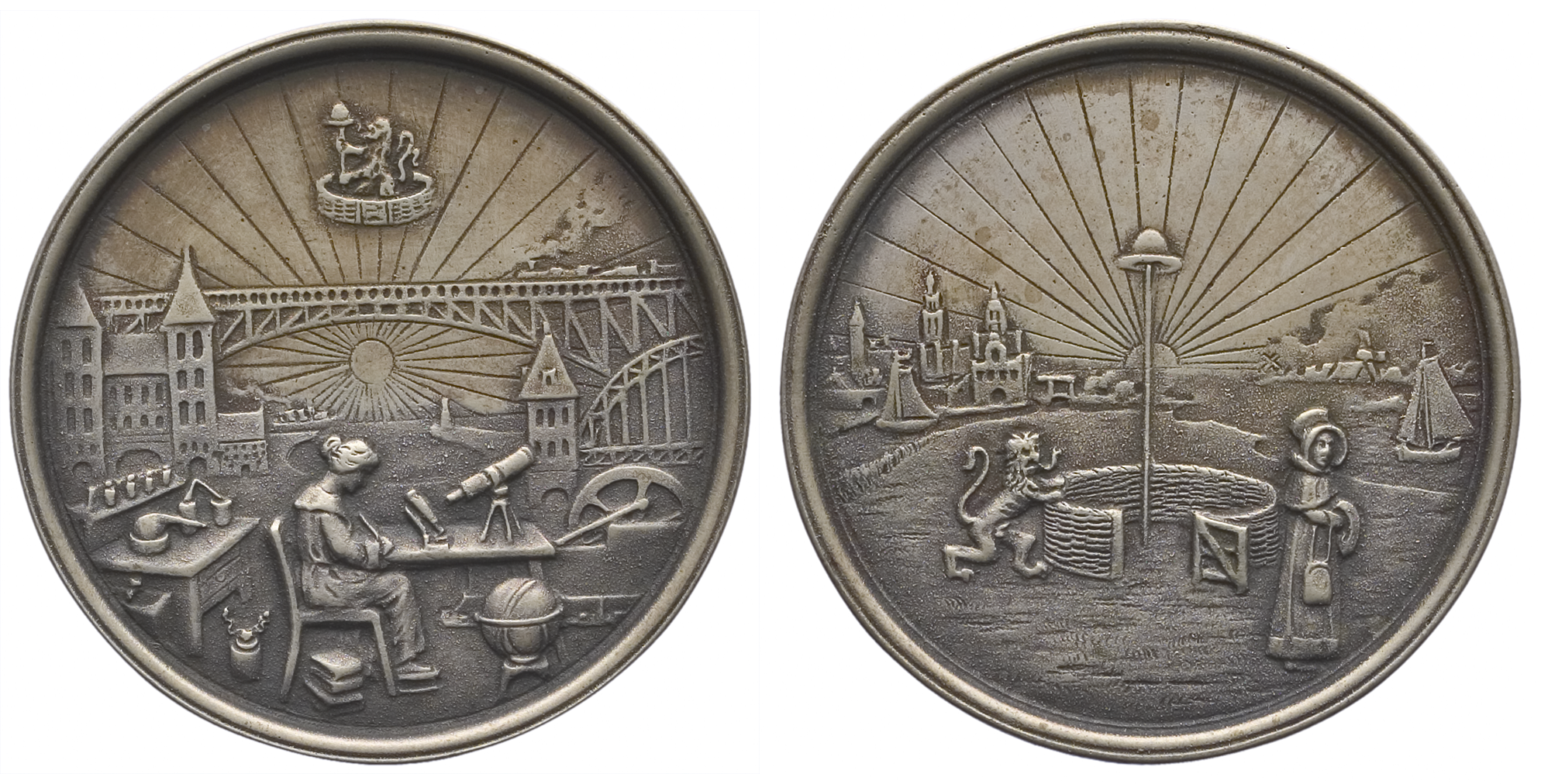
silver exhibition medal from De Vrouw 1813-1913

De Vrouw 1813–1913 (The Woman 1813–1913) was an exhibition held in 1913 in Amsterdam celebrating the 100th anniversary of liberation of the Netherlands from French occupiers in 1813. It highlighted the achievements of women through the century following liberation.

De Vrouw 1813–1913 followed the successful 1898 feminist exhibition Nationale Tentoonstelling van Vrouwenarbeid (National Exhibition of Women's Labor). De Vrouw 1813–1913 was organized by Mia Boissevain and Rosa Manus. Presented in the style of the popular turn-of-the-century World's Fairs, it was hoped that the exhibition would further the cause of Dutch women's suffrage. It included information on the women's movement and women's place in Dutch society. As well as political and social information, the exhibit displayed visual arts, literature, and drama. The exhibition had a conference hall where there were weekly lectures on feminist topics.

There were about 300,000 visitors to the exhibition. Queen Wilhelmina visited the exhibition twice, first in May and again in August.
