= International Alliance of Women =

International non-governmental organization

International Alliance of Women Alliance Internationale des Femmes
- Formation: Berlin, 3 June 1904; 122 years ago
- Founder: Carrie Chapman Catt
- Type: INGO
- Purpose: Political advocacy
- Headquarters: Geneva, Switzerland
- Members: 44 member organizations
- Official language: English and French
- President: Alison Brown
- Secretary-General: Antonia Lavine
- Affiliations: General Consultative Status with the United Nations Economic and Social Council, Participatory Status with the Council of Europe
- Website: womenalliance.org

The International Alliance of Women (IAW; French: Alliance Internationale des Femmes, AIF) is an international non-governmental organization that works to promote women's rights and gender equality. It was historically the main international organization that campaigned for women's suffrage. IAW stands for an inclusive, intersectional and progressive liberal feminism on the basis of human rights and liberal democracy, and has a liberal internationalist outlook. IAW's principles state that all genders are "born equally free [and are] equally entitled to the free exercise of their individual rights and liberty," that "women's rights are human rights" and that "human rights are universal, indivisible and interrelated."

In 1904 the Alliance adopted gold (or yellow) as its color, the color associated with the women's suffrage movement in the United States since 1867 and the oldest symbol of women's rights; through the Alliance's influence gold and white became the principal colors of the mainstream international women's suffrage movement.

The basic principle of IAW is that the full and equal enjoyment of human rights is due to all women and girls. It was one of the principal international organizations of the women's suffrage movement: the Alliance was founded by suffragists from eleven countries, maintained London headquarters for much of its early history, and by 1915 its newspaper Jus Suffragii represented women in twenty-six countries. The organization was founded as the International Woman Suffrage Alliance (IWSA) in 1904 in Berlin, Germany, by Carrie Chapman Catt, Millicent Fawcett, Susan B. Anthony and other leading feminists from around the world to campaign for women's suffrage. Its emphasis has since shifted to a broad human rights focus and the importance and value of women's contributions as equal partners. The prerequisite for securing women's rights is the universal ratification and implementation without reservation of the Convention on the Elimination of All Forms of Discrimination against Women (CEDAW). Today it represents 44 member organizations worldwide as well as individual members, and has its seat in Geneva. It also accepts individual members.

From 1926, the organization had strong ties to the League of Nations. Since 1947, IAW has had general consultative status to the United Nations Economic and Social Council, the highest UN status possible for a non-governmental organization, the fourth organization to be granted this status. IAW also has participatory status with the Council of Europe. It has representatives at the UN headquarters in New York, the UN office in Geneva, the UN office in Vienna, UNESCO in Paris, the Food and Agriculture Organization in Rome and the Council of Europe in Strasbourg. It also has representatives to the Arab League in Cairo and the Gulf Countries Council in Riyadh, and is a member of the European Women's Lobby in Brussels. IAW's working languages are English and French.

== History ==
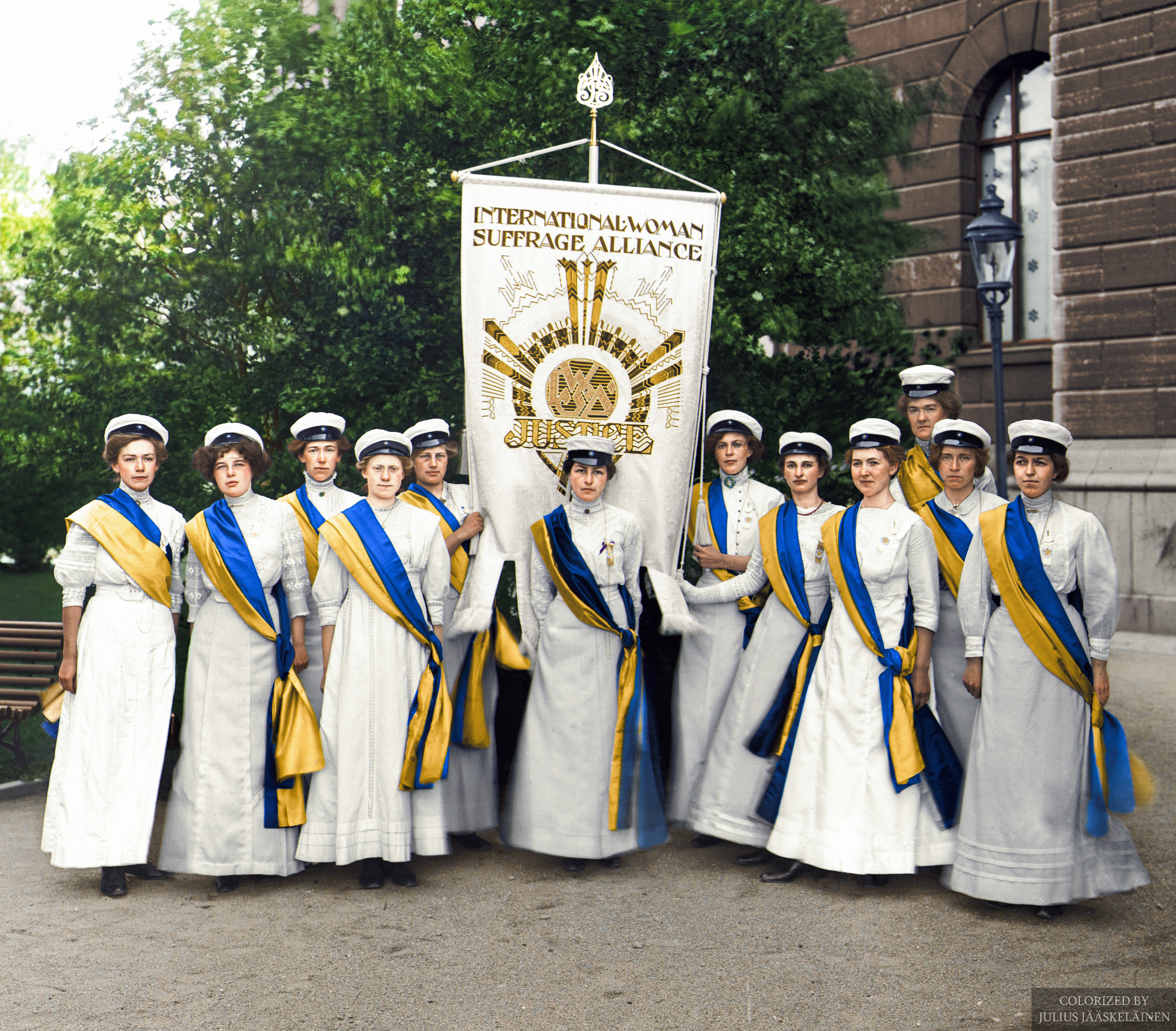
Colorized picture of Women from the Swedish National Association for Women's Suffrage (LKPR) (with student caps) in front of IWSA's (now IAW's) banner at the suffrage conference in Stockholm in 1911. Gold and white were the primary colors of the mainstream or liberal international women's suffrage movement, and had been used by American liberal suffragists since 1867

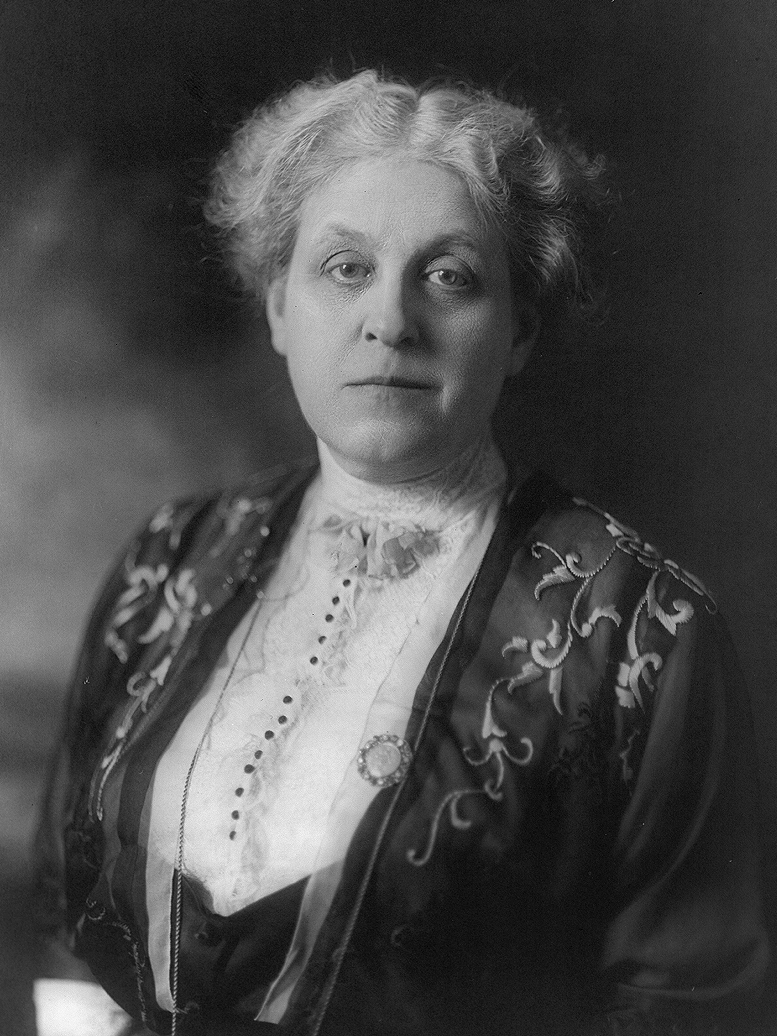
IAW's first President Carrie Chapman Catt

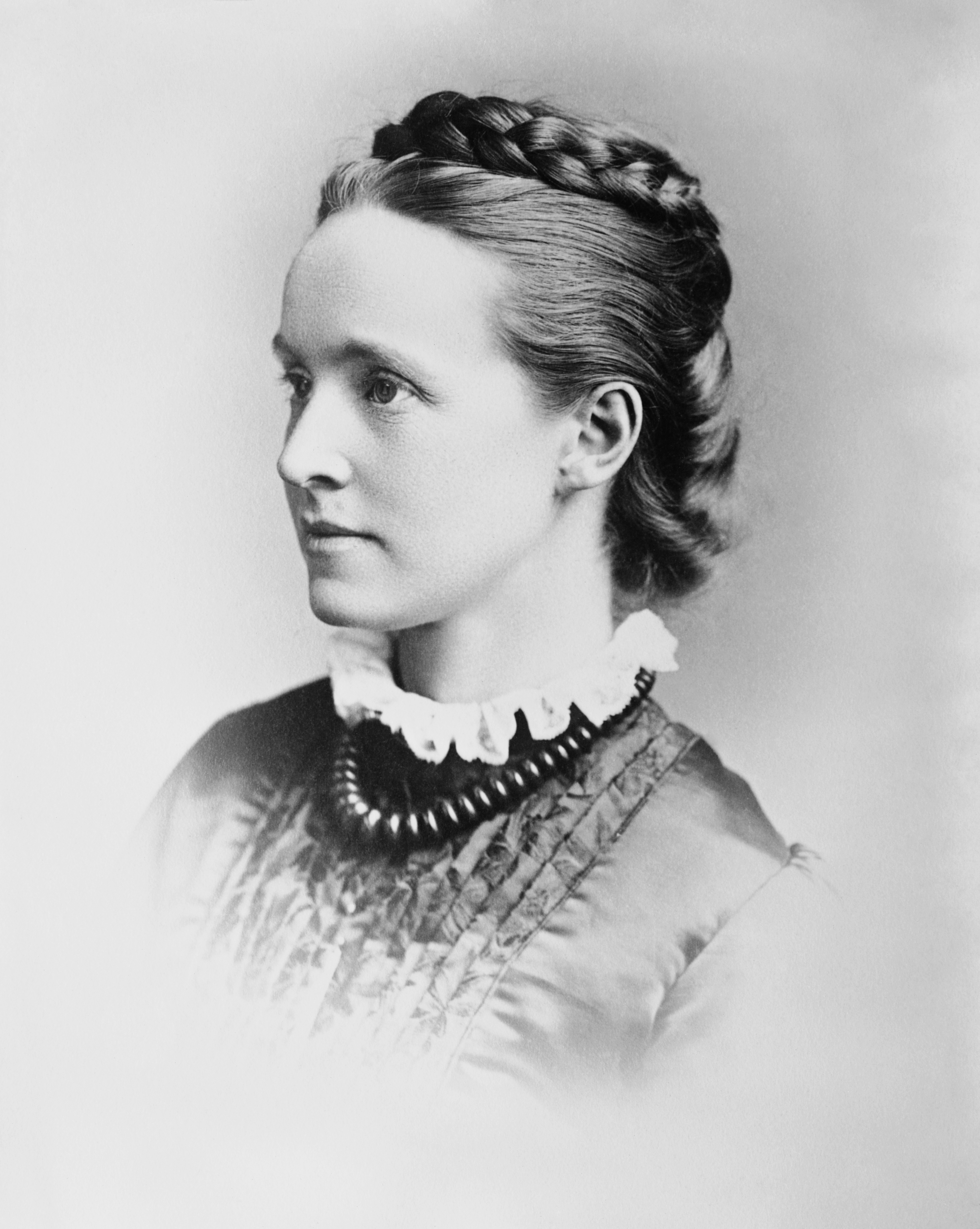
Co-founder and Vice President, Dame Millicent Fawcett

The International Alliance of Women, formerly the International Woman Suffrage Alliance, is historically the most important international organization within the bourgeois-liberal women's rights movement. The decision for the establishment of the organization was taken in Washington in 1902 by suffragists frustrated at the reluctance of the International Council of Women to support women's suffrage. As such the Alliance was a more progressive organization that emphasized legal and political equality between women and men from the outset. The Alliance was formally constituted during the Second conference in Berlin in 1904 as the International Woman Suffrage Alliance (IWSA), and was headquartered in London for much of its history. Its founders included Carrie Chapman Catt, Millicent Fawcett, Helene Lange, Susan B. Anthony, Anita Augspurg, Rachel Foster Avery, and Käthe Schirmacher. Adela Stanton Coit was also among those associated with the Alliance's foundation in 1904 and later served as its treasurer.

Among subsequent congresses were those held in Copenhagen (1906), Amsterdam (1908), London (1909), Stockholm (June 1911), and Budapest (1913). The French Union for Women's Suffrage (UFSF), founded in February 1909, was formally recognized by the IWSA congress in London in April 1909 as representing the French suffrage movement. IWSA also started its own monthly journal, Jus Suffragii. IWSA, influenced by moderate liberal feminist Millicent Fawcett to take a position against 'militant' tactics in suffrage campaigns, refused membership to the WSPU at their 1906 Copenhagen meeting.

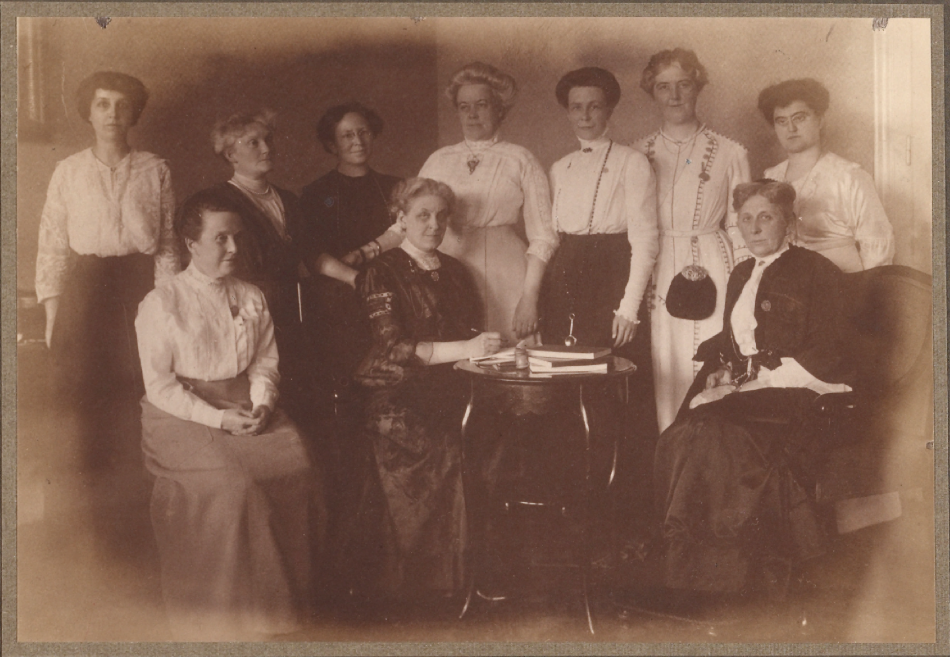
Board of the International Woman Suffrage Alliance at the 1913 Budapest congress. Standing row, left to right: Katherine Dexter McCormick, Adela Stanton Coit, Anna Lindemann, Annie Furuhjelm, Signe Bergmann, Chrystal Macmillan and Rosika Schwimmer. Seated row, left to right: Millicent Garrett Fawcett, Carrie Chapman Catt and Marguerite de Witt-Schlumberger.

At the Budapest congress, the Alliance discussed establishing international headquarters, enlarging Jus Suffragii and moving its publication. Coit, as treasurer, reported that £2,000 would be needed for the next two years to fund new headquarters, a paid secretary, an enlarged newspaper and publications; pledges of £2,510 were made. After the congress, the official monthly paper moved from Rotterdam to London and the Alliance established its international headquarters there. The Headquarters Committee consisted of Catt, Fawcett, Coit and Chrystal Macmillan; Coit chaired it for its first two years, and the three London members held seventy meetings between 1913 and 1920.

In the interwar period, the organization was one of the three major international "bourgeois" women's organizations, alongside the International Council of Women (ICW) and the Women's International League for Peace and Freedom (WILPF). Of these, IWSA (IAW) was more progressive and oriented towards legal equality and equal citizenship than ICW. At the same time, IWSA was more conservative than WILPF. The organization's members were often associated with liberal parties and movements, but some were also progressive conservatives or liberal conservatives. Most IAW members held "similar views of society and societal change, which assumed a top-down approach, where the elite were cast as the true agents of development." At the same time IAW claimed to speak on behalf of all women.

In the late 1920s, the organization changed its name to the International Alliance of Women for Suffrage and Equal Citizenship, and in 1946 this was altered to its current name, International Alliance of Women. The first executive board included Carrie Chapman Catt as president, Anita Augspurg as first vice-president, Millicent Garrett Fawcett as second vice-president and Rachel Foster Avery as secretary.

The organization's first President Carrie Chapman Catt also founded the League of Women Voters in the United States during her presidency.

The organization's second President, Margery Corbett-Ashby, spoke at length about the IWSA in a series of oral history interviews with the historian, Brian Harrison, conducted as part of the Suffrage Interviews project, titled Oral evidence on the suffragette and suffragist movements: the Brian Harrison interviews. The April 1975, September, November and December 1976, and February 1977 interviews all contain information about the IWSA.

Since the onset of the Cold War the alliance's liberal internationalist outlook was strengthened. The alliance held firm anti-communist views and maintained a clear pro-Western stance throughout the Cold War. Dame Margery Corbett Ashby, wrote that "it was us or the communist women who would organize the Near East." In the alliance's journal International Women's News it was stated in 1946 that the support of the United Nations and democracy must "remain in the forefront of our programme." Its third President Hanna Rydh worked actively to build cooperation in developing countries, partially to counteract communism.

IAW's members in the Nordic countries were also members of the Joint Organization of Nordic Women's Rights Associations.

== Policies ==
=== Principles ===
IAW works for a gender-equal society on the basis of human rights. The principles of IAW affirm that everyone, regardless of gender, is "born equally free and independent" and equally entitled to "the free exercise of their individual rights and liberty." The principles affirm that "women’s rights are human rights" and that "human rights are universal, indivisible and interrelated." IAW stands in a liberal democratic tradition; in IAW's journal International Women's News, it was stated in 1946 that support for democracy must "remain in the forefront of our programme." Former IAW President Marion Böker emphasized in 2023 that it is important to defend democratic values.

=== Political equality ===
IAW was founded to advocate for women's suffrage and political equality remains one of its traditional core issues.

=== Education ===
Girls' and women's education has been an important focus of the liberal women's rights movement since the 19th century, and remains one of the core issues of IAW and its affiliates. In line with IAW's increased focus on developing countries from the mid-20th century, girls' and women's education in developing countries has become an increasingly important topic.

=== Legal and economic equality ===
Legal and economic gender equality have been core issues of the liberal women's rights movement since the 19th century. For example, IAW works to strengthen women's land and property rights, especially in developing countries.

=== Sexual and reproductive health and rights ===
Sexual and reproductive health and rights is another focus of IAW and its affiliates, that has become more important since the postwar era. Currently, the IAW is hosting a project called "Water and Pads for schoolgirls- Empowerment for Life!" which aims to provide a basic menstrual health education in IAW member countries in Asia and Africa.

=== Violence against women and girls ===
Violence against women and girls, both conflict-related violence and domestic violence, is also a significant focus of IAW and its affiliates, particularly in modern times. For instance, the IAW wrote to the President of Nigeria urging the prosecution the members of Boko Haram following the abduction of 20 schoolgirls by the extremist organization in 2014.

=== Sexual and gender diversity ===
The IAW family belongs to the mainstream or liberal women's rights tradition and shares the mainstream feminist position on LGBT+ rights, which understands sexual and gender diversity as an essential aspect of women's human rights and gender equality. Speaking on trans inclusion, former IAW President Marion Böker said that for the women's rights movement, it is necessary to work on the basis of human rights, which are universal and indivisible, defend democratic values, and fight for an inclusive women's movement, and warned against anti-democratic forces and forces on the far right that try to pit women's rights against the human rights of minorities, describing anti-trans activists as "right-wing and racist." In 2021 IAW and its affiliate, the Icelandic Women's Rights Association (IWRA), co-organized a CSW forum on how the women's rights movement can counter anti-trans voices that threaten "feminist solidarity across borders," where Böker discussed her trans-inclusive position.

IAW affiliates such as Deutscher Frauenring advocate for trans-inclusive feminism and emphasize that far-right movements that undermine the human rights of minorities threaten democracy. The Danish Women's Society has stated that it sees the LGBTQA movement as a close ally in the struggle against inequality. The Norwegian Association for Women's Rights has warned against the anti-gender movement and supported legal protections against discrimination and hate speech on the basis of sexual orientation, gender identity and gender expression. The Icelandic Women's Rights Association has published a report on the situation of non-binary people in Iceland.

== Symbols ==
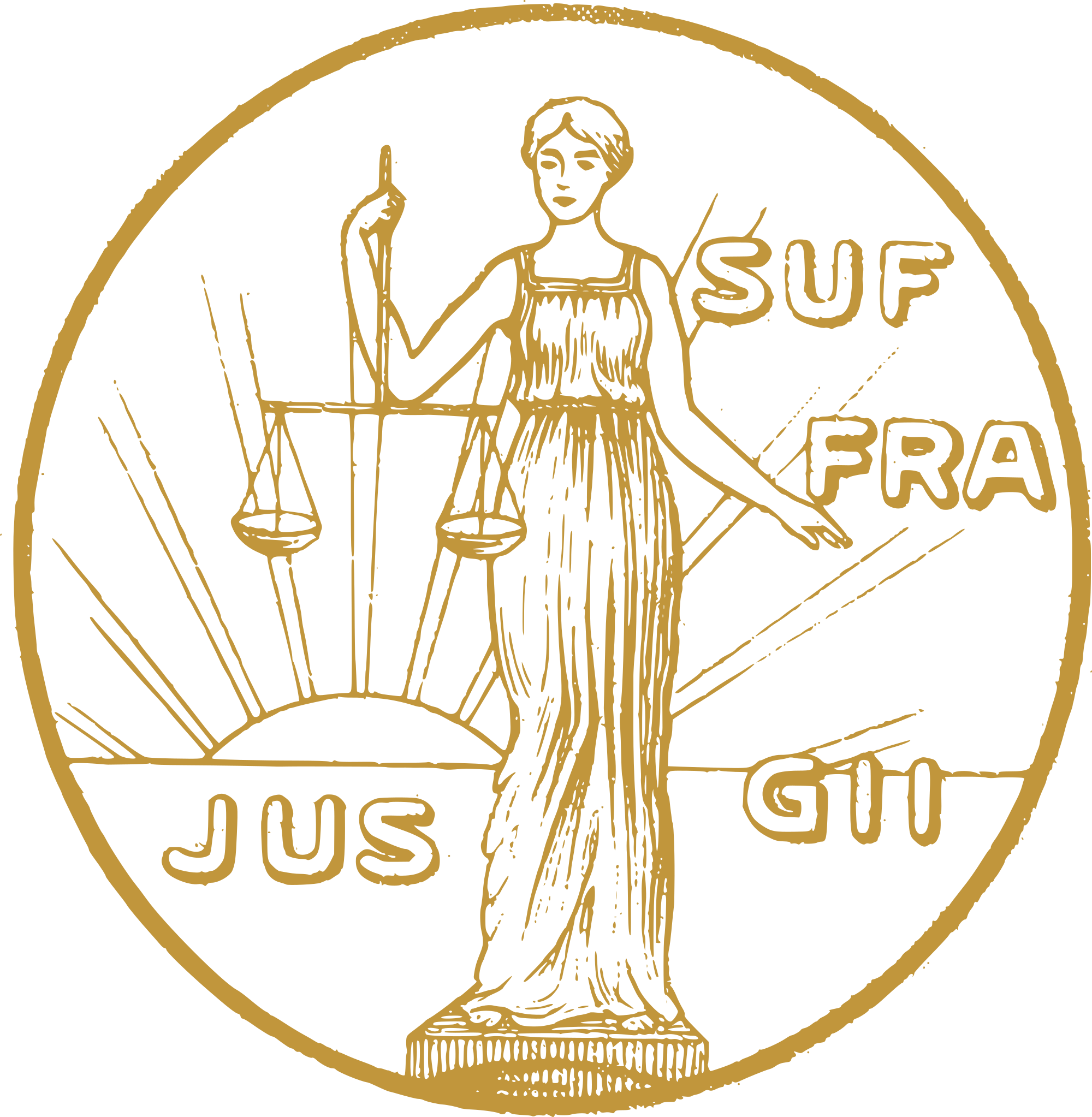
The original version of the logo of the International Woman Suffrage Alliance, now IAW

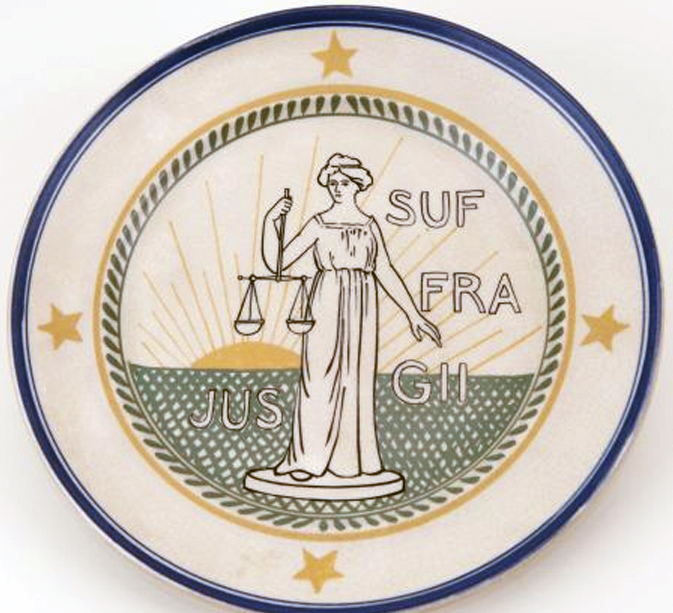
Plate with the symbol and motto of the International Woman Suffrage Alliance (IWSA). Text: "Jus Suffragii" (the right to vote). Lady Justitita holding a balance in her right hand.

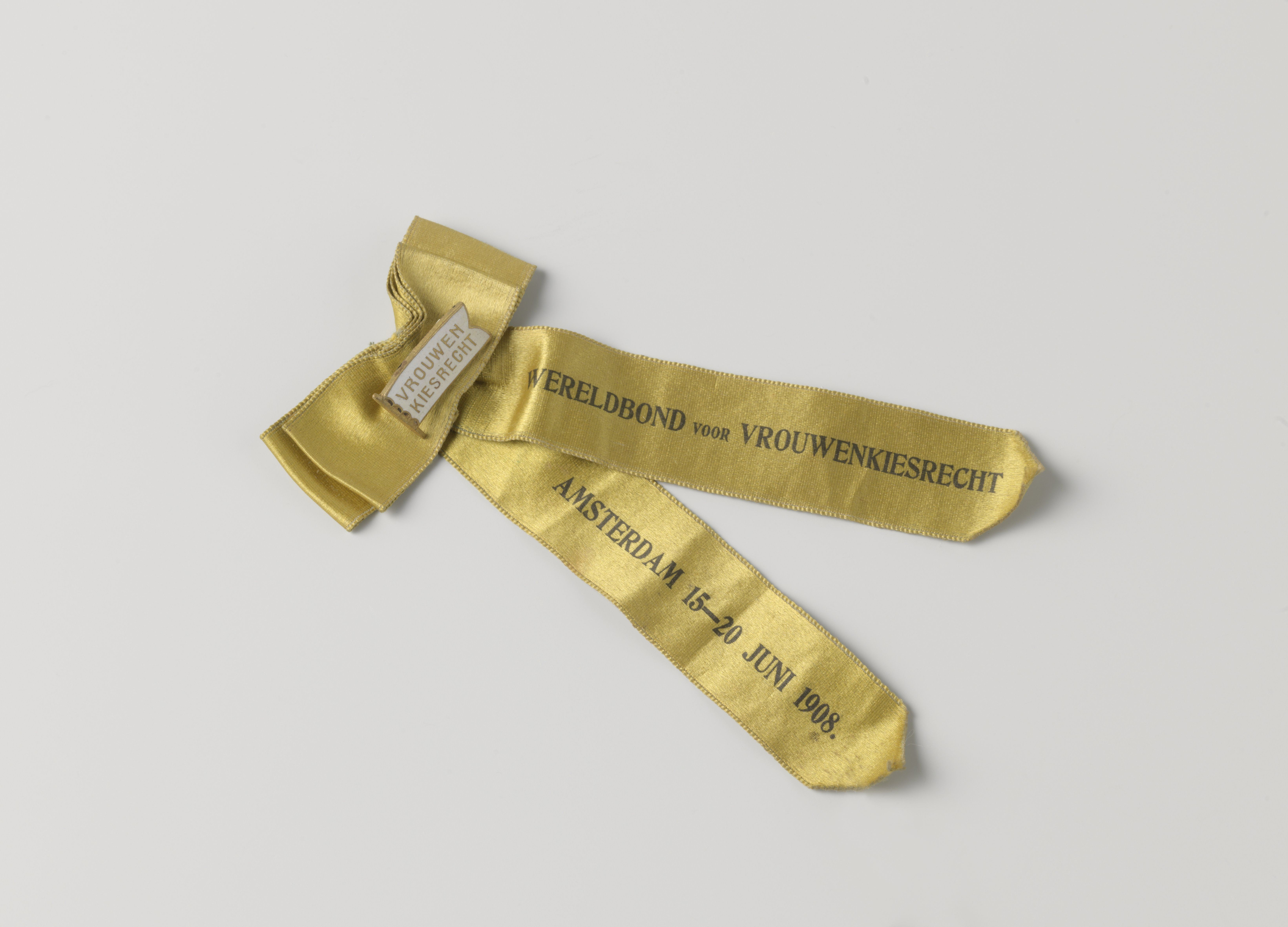
Gold ribbon used during the Fourth Conference of the International Woman Suffrage Alliance in Amsterdam, 1908. The color gold/yellow is the oldest symbol of women's rights

The organization adopted gold (or yellow; Or in heraldry) as its color in 1904. The color, derived from the sunflower, is the oldest symbol of women's rights. It had been adopted by American suffragists in 1867 and became the principal color of the American women's suffrage movement, typically used alongside white. Through the influence of the Alliance, gold and white became the principal colors of the mainstream international women's suffrage movement. Gold was associated with the sunflower, the Kansas state symbol, after Elizabeth Cady Stanton and Susan B. Anthony's 1867 Kansas campaign, and also signified enlightenment, the professed goal of the mainstream U.S. suffrage movement.

== Conferences ==
- 1st, Washington, D.C., 1902
- 2nd, Berlin, 1904
- 3rd, Copenhagen, 1906
- 4th, Amsterdam, 1908
- 5th, London, 1909
- 6th, Stockholm, 1911
- 7th, Budapest, 1913
- 8th, Geneva, 1920
- 9th, Rome, 1923
- 10th, Paris, 1926
- 11th, Berlin, 1929
- 12th, Istanbul, 1935
- 13th, Copenhagen, 1939
- 14th, Interlaken, 1946
- 15th, Amsterdam, 1949
- 16th, Naples, 1952
- 17th, Colombo, Ceylon, 1955
- 18th, Athens, 1958
- 19th, Dublin, 1961
- 21st, England, 1967
- 22nd, Königstein, West Germany, 1970
- 23rd, New Delhi, 1973

== Organization ==
An International Congress is held triennially in the home country of a member organization, and elects the executive board. The current President and Chief Representative to the United Nations is Alison Brown. The executive board also includes the Secretary-General, the Treasurer and until 20 other members, including two Executive Vice Presidents as well as Vice Presidents for Europe, the Arab countries, the Arab states of the Persian Gulf, Africa, and Regional Coordinators for North America, Pacific, and South East Asia.

=== Presidents ===
1. Carrie Chapman Catt (US) 1904–1923
2. Dame Margery Corbett Ashby (UK) 1923–1946
3. Hanna Rydh (Sweden) 1946–1952
4. Ester Graff (Denmark) 1952–1958
5. Ezlynn Deraniyagala (Sri Lanka) 1958–1964
6. Begum Anwar Ahmed (Pakistan) 1964–1970
7. Edith Anrep (Sweden) 1970–1973
8. Olive Bloomer (UK) 1979–1989
9. Alice Yotopoulos-Marangopoulos (Greece) 1989–1996
10. Patricia Giles (Australia) 1996–2004
11. Rosy Weiss (Austria) 2004–2010
12. Lyda Verstegen (The Netherlands) 2010–2013
13. Joanna Manganara (Greece) 2013–2020
14. Cheryl Hayles (Canada) 2020–2021
15. Marion Böker (Germany) 2021–2022
16. Alison Brown (US) 2022–

== Current status ==
The IAW represents 44 member organizations worldwide as well as individual members, and has its seat in Geneva. The IAW was granted general consultative status to the United Nations Economic and Social Council, the highest level possible, in 1947, and has participatory status with the Council of Europe. The IAW has permanent representatives in New York, Vienna, Geneva, Paris, Rome, Nairobi and Strasbourg and addresses the European Union through its membership in the European Women's Lobby in Brussels. The IAW's current representative to the UN headquarters, Soon-Young Yoon, is also chair of the NGO Committee on the Status of Women, New York.

The IAW pays particular attention to the universal ratification and implementation without reservation of the Convention on the Elimination of All Forms of Discrimination Against Women (CEDAW) and its Optional Protocol. The current IAW Commissions deal with the topics: Justice and Human Rights; Democracy; Peace; Elimination of Violence and Health.

== Members ==
Affiliates

- Association des femmes de l'Europe Méridionale, France
- African Women Lawyers Association (AWLA), Nigeria
- All India Women's Conference, India
- All Pakistan Women's Association, Pakistan
- Association Suisse pour les Droits de la Femme, Switzerland
- Bangladesh Mahila Samity, Bangladesh
- Canadian Federation of University Women (CFUW-FCFDU), Canada
- Country Women's Association of India, India
- Danish Women's Society, Denmark
- Deutscher Frauenring, Germany
- German Association of Female Citizens, Germany
- Frederika Bremer Förbundet, Sweden
- Greek League for Women’s Rights, Greece
- Hoda Chawari Association, Egypt
- Israel Federation of the Women's International Zionist Organization, Israel
- Kvenréttindafélag Íslands, Iceland
- League of Women Voters of Nigeria, Nigeria
- Lithuanian Women’s Society, Lithuania
- Nederlandse Vereniging voor Vrouwenbelangen, The Netherlands
- Norwegian Association for Women's Rights, Norway
- ntengwe for community development, Zimbabwe
- L'Observatoire Marocain des Droits des Femmes (OMDF), Morocco
- Pancyprian Movement Equal Rights & Equal Responsibilities, Cyprus
- Unioni Naisasialiito Suomessa Ry, Finland
- Women's Electoral Lobby, Australia
- Women Empowerment and Human Resource Development Centre of India, India
- Zambia Alliance of Women, Zambia

Associate members

- Alliance of Women of Serbia and Montenegro, Serbia
- APWA UK, United Kingdom
- Association d'Aide à l'Education de l'Enfant Handicapé, France and Cameroon
- Association Féminine Songmanégré pour le Développement AFD, Burkina Faso
- Bali Women's Union of Farming Groups, Cameroon
- CEFAP – Ladies Circle, Cameroon
- Frauen Netzwerk für Frieden, Germany
- La Colombe, Togo
- League of Women Voters of Victoria, Australia
- Olympes da la Parole – Voices of Olympia, Canada
- Reseau national des associations de tantines (RENATA) National Network of Aunties Association, Cameroon
- Rural Women’s Network of Nepal, Nepal
- Saroj Nalini Dutt Memorial Association, India
- Solidarité des femmes pour le développement, environnement et droits de l'enfant au Congo (SOFEDEC), Congo
- Sri Lanka Women’s Association in the UK (SLWA), United Kingdom
- Survie de la Mere et de l'Enfant, Benin
- Women's Comfort Corner, Zimbabwe

== See also ==
- List of suffragists and suffragettes
- List of women's rights activists
- List of women's rights organizations
- Women's suffrage organizations
- Timeline of women's suffrage
- Timeline of women's rights (other than voting)
