= International Association of Women in Radio and Television =

The International Association of Women in Radio and Television (IAWRT) is a women's organization involved in the broadcasting industry. The organisation of professional women working in media or educating about electronic and allied media, has a mission to strengthen initiatives which ensure women’s views and values are integral to media programming and to advance the impact of women in media.

IAWRT has consultative status with the United Nations Economic and Social Council (ECOSOC)

== History ==
The first meetings to form the organisation were held in 1949 and 1950. Delegates from eight countries officially formed what was then called IARW (International Association of Radio Women) in 1951. It became IAWRT (International Association of Women in Radio and Television) in 1957.

One of the founders of the organization, Willemijn Posthumus-van der Goot, left an extensive collection of papers from its early years, which are housed in the International Archives for the Women's Movement (Dutch: Internationaal Informatiecentrum en Archief voor de Vrouwenbeweging (IIAV)), located within the Atria Institute, a major women's archive based in Amsterdam.

IAWRT has long addressed the issue of what the media conveys, and the need for equity in the workplace. During the 1950s through to the 1980s, it was a friendship organization between women journalists on either side of the Iron Curtain, but one which shared professional insights and aimed to promote peace. At first, only one member from each country was permitted to join. As times changed, IAWRT became more of a networking organization for media women, holding its first conferences on the Asian continent in the Philippines in 1994, and then on the African continent in Zimbabwe in 1997. The formation of country chapters began under the leadership of the first Asian based president, the late Jai Chandiram of India.

As IAWRT continued to evolve, it included female digital journalists and media academics, and it began implementing media projects in various parts of the global south, supported by FOKUS in Norway. It has run projects and reported on gender representation on the media and released one of the few safety handbooks for journalists specifically aimed at the safety of women practitioners. IAWRT has worked on community film and media and the establishment of disaster response community radio in the Philippines. As well it has taken an increasing participatory role in the annual NGO-CSW and CSW held annually around and in UN headquarters in New York, USA. IT and Gender Justice solutions to cyber violence were among the 2018 events which IAWRT participated in. In 2019 its presentation will be Community Media Models for Disaster Preparedness and Risk Management. Its next publication will be a handbook on best practices for gender mainstreaming (women's voices in newsrooms and on the media) in 2019.

The organisation today has 14 chapters across the world and organizes regional and international conferences, film festivals, workshops and training for the professional development of its members. This includes safety training.

The 2018 regional conference was in Uganda. The 2017 biennial conference took place in Quezon City, the Philippines.

The President for 2017-20 is freelance Zimbabwean journalist and broadcaster, Violet Gonda. The Vice President is journalist safety trainer and Egyptian journalist Abeer Saady.

The United Nations main representative is Sheila Katzman backed by Rebecca Myles, both from the US Chapter.
