= Broese van Groenou =

Broese van Groenou is a Dutch surname. Notable people with the surname include:

- Wolter Broese van Groenou (1842–1924), Dutch businessman
  - Mien Broese van Groenou (1875–1960), Dutch feminist and pacifist
  - Dolf Broese van Groenou (1880–1961), Dutch athlete and architect
