= Miroiu =

Miroiu is a Romanian surname. Notable people with the surname include:

- Adrian Miroiu (born 1954), Romanian political philosopher
- Mihaela Miroiu (born 1955), Romanian political theorist and activist
