= Krassimira Daskalova =

Bulgarian historian

- Красимира Петрова Даскалова
- Born: 1957 (age 68–69)
- Other names: Krasimira Daskalova, Krassimira Petrova Daskalova
- Occupation: academic
- Years active: 1992–present

Krassimira Daskalova (Bulgarian: Красимира Петрова Даскалова, born 1957) is a Bulgarian academic and pioneer in gender studies. She served as editor of L'Homme: European Journal of Feminist History from 2003 to 2011 and is co-editor of Aspasia since 2007. Between 2005 and 2010 she was president of the International Federation for Research in Women's History.

== Early life and education ==
Krassimira Daskalova was born in 1957 and grew up in Ruse, Bulgaria. She graduated from the Hristo Botev Gymnasium in Ruse in 1975 and entered Sofia University the following year. After completing her master's degree in 1981, she worked in the State Historical Archive in Ruse as a research assistant until 1982. In 1983, she began working conducting historical and sociological research at the Center for Cultural Studies at Sofia University. The aim of her research was to assist in compiling the българската възрожденска интелигенция (Bulgarian Revival Intelligentsia) an encyclopedia published in 1988. The following year, Daskalova began her PhD studies and successfully defended her thesis, Учителите в Българското възраждане (Teachers in the Bulgarian Revival) in 1992. A polyglot, Daskalova speaks and has published in Bulgarian, English, French, German, Italian, Russian and Serbian. She has completed post-graduate research on scholarships and fellowships from the Fulbright Program, the German Academic Exchange Service, the Institute for Human Sciences, the Japanese Association of University Women, the Körber Foundation, and the Radcliffe Institute for Advanced Studies at Harvard University.

== Career ==
From 1992 to 2000, Daskalova taught as an assistant professor in library sciences and history, before being promoted to associate professor in the later year. Her two main focuses in teaching and research are the history of literature and the history women and gender relations. With regard to literature she has evaluated Bulgarian publishing, the history of reading, censorship, and the impact of literature on the intelligentsia. She has written about the origins of the Bulgarian women's movement in the 1850s, during the Ottoman Empire, as well as barriers to women's education and access to professions, which persisted in law and medicine until 1945. One of the pioneers in Bulgarian gender studies, she assisted in founding the academic discipline from the early 1990s. Introducing interdisciplinary comparative studies, Daskalova has evaluated discussion on methodological issues in documenting historic gendered studies, analyzed women's identity in the culture over time, and studied the representation of women in traditional textbooks. Her work has often uncovered narratives with meticulous research which were in conflict with the "official perspective of historical events".

From 2003 to 2011, Daskalova served as editor at the academic journal L'Homme: European Journal of Feminist History and from 2007, she had been co-editor of Aspasia. Her 2004 book, Voices of Their Own: Oral History Interviews of Women brought together a broad spectrum of women, from different ethnic backgrounds, who held diverse religious and political beliefs, and represented different levels of educational training and social class. The interviews were centered on the family and sought to gather information on the changing state of women in the twentieth century. Her 2006 book, A Biographical Dictionary of Women's Movements and Feminisms: Central, Eastern, and South Eastern Europe, 19th and 20th Centuries which was co-edited by Francisca de Haan and Anna Loutfi was honored that year by Choice Reviews with an "Outstanding Academic Title" award.

Between 2004 and 2008, Daskalova was chair on the board of the Bulgarian Association of University Women. From 2005 to 2010, she served as president of the International Federation for Research in Women's History. In 2009, she was involved in the launching of Sofia University's master's degree program in Women's and Gender History. In 2012, Daskalova was promoted full professor, after extensive review by her peers. Her book, Жени, пол и модернизация в България, 1878–1944 (Women, Gender and Modernization in Bulgaria, 1878–1944), published in 2012, treated the topic of sexuality and prostitution, which had not previously been evaluated in Bulgaria's history. Daskalova manages the first European master's degree program in women's and gender history. The program is operated as a consortium of scholars from participating universities of Central European University (Hungary), Lumière University Lyon 2 (France), Ruhr University Bochum (Germany), Sofia University (Bulgaria), the University of Padua (Italy), and the University of Vienna (Austria). Completing the program requires that students take at least one semester of courses at each partner.

== Selected works ==
- Daskalova, Krassimira (1997). Literacy and Reading in 19th Century Bulgaria. The Donald W. Treadgold Papers in Russian, East European and Central Asian Studies. Vol. 12. Seattle, Washington: Henry M. Jackson School of International Studies. OCLC 68466801.
- Daskalova, Krassimira (1997). "14. The Women's Movement in Bulgaria After Communism". In Scott, Joan Wallach; Kaplan, Cora; Keates, Debra (eds.). Transitions, Environments, Translations: Feminisms in International Politics. London: Routledge. pp. 162–175. ISBN 978-0-415-91541-0.
- Daskalova, Krassimira (March 2000). "Establishing a Women's History Course on Women in Bulgarian Society, 1840-1940, at Sofia University". Women's History Review. 9 (1). London: Taylor & Francis: 149–153. doi:10.1080/09612020000200229. ISSN 0961-2025. OCLC 4649343568. S2CID 144090260.
- Daskalova, Krassimira, ed. (2004). Voices of their Own: Oral History Interviews of Women. Translated by Muharska and, Ralitsa; Stoitsova, Elitsa. Sofia, Bulgaria: Polis Publishers. ISBN 978-954-796-008-4.
- de Haan, Francisca; Daskalova, Krasimira; Loutfi, Anna, eds. (2006). Biographical Dictionary of Women's Movements and Feminisms in Central, Eastern, and South Eastern Europe: 19th and 20th Centuries (1st ed.). Budapest, Hungary: Central European University Press. ISBN 978-963-7326-39-4.
- Hellsten, Sirkku K.; Holli, Anne Maria; Daskalova, Krassimira, eds. (2006). Women's Citizenship and Political Rights. Basingstoke, Hampshire: Palgrave Macmillan. ISBN 978-0-230-50290-1.
- Daskalova, Krassimira; Tomić, Caroline Hornstein; Kaser, Karl; Radunović, Filip, eds. (2012). Gendering Post-socialist Transition: Studies of Changing Gender Perspectives. ERSTE Stiftung. Vol. 1. Münster: LIT Verlag. ISBN 978-3-643-90229-0.
- Даскалова, Красимира (2012). Жени, пол и модернизация в България, 1878-1944 [Women, Gender and Modernization in Bulgaria, 1878-1944] (in Bulgarian). Sofia, Bulgaria: УИ "Св. Климент Охридски". ISBN 978-954-07-3319-7.
- Daskalova, Krasimira (2012). "Women's Suffrage in Bulgaria". In Rodríguez-Ruiz, Blanca; Rubio-Marín, Ruth (eds.). The Struggle for Female Suffrage in Europe: Voting to Become Citizens. Leiden, The Netherlands: Brill Publishers. pp. 321–338. ISBN 978-90-04-22425-4.
