= Aspasia (journal) =

- Discipline: History, gender studies
- Language: English
- Edited by: Maria Bucur, Krassimira Daskalova, Francisca de Haan

Publication details
- History: 2007–present
- Publisher: Berghahn Books
- Frequency: Annually

Standard abbreviations
- ISO 4: Aspasia

Indexing
- ISSN: 1933-2882 (print); 1933-2890 (web)
- LCCN: 2006212894
- OCLC no.: 778617456

Links
- Journal homepage

Aspasia: The International Yearbook of Central, Eastern, and Southeastern European Women's and Gender History is an annual peer-reviewed academic journal covering research on women's and gender history in central, eastern, and southeastern Europe. Aspasia was founded in 2006 by Francisca de Haan at the Gender Studies Department of the Central European University and is published by Berghahn Journals. Early editorial board members included the historians Maria Bucur and Krassimira Daskalova.

In the first decade of its existence, the yearbook became an important outlet for feminist research conducted by scholars from Central and Eastern Europe, such as the Romanian philosopher Mihaela Miroiu. In addition to original research articles, the yearbook publishes forums on topics related to women’s and gender history, as well as numerous English book reviews of texts published in the languages of Central and Eastern Europe.

== Abstracting and indexing ==
The journal is indexed and abstracted in:

- America: History and Life
- British Humanities Index
- Index Islamicus
- International Bibliography of Book Reviews of Scholarly Literature on the Humanities and Social Sciences
- International Bibliography of Periodical Literature
- MLA International Bibliography
- Scopus
- Sociological Abstracts
