= Johanna Naber =

Dutch feminist, historian and author

Johanna Wilhelmina Antoinette Naber
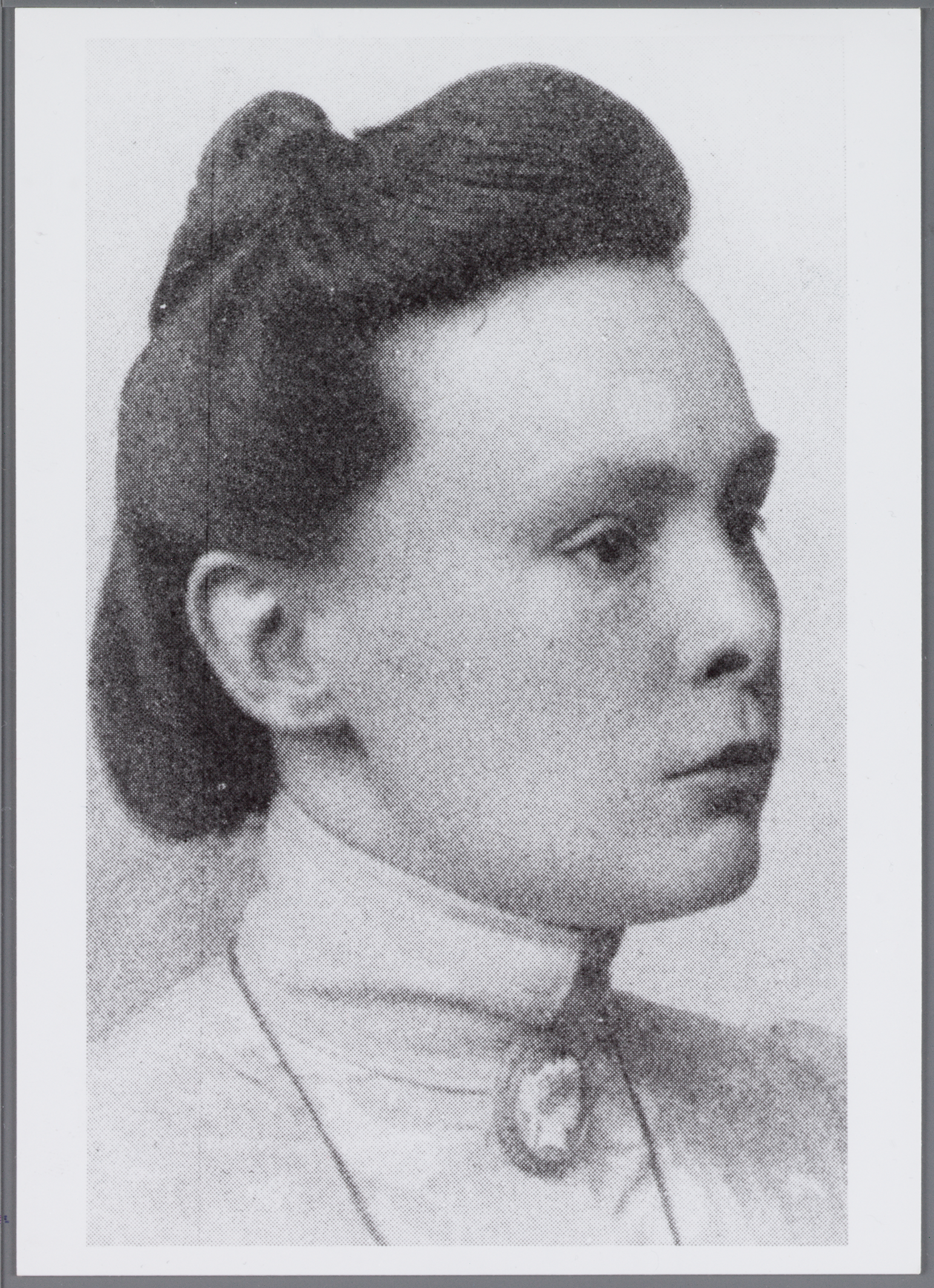
- Johanna Naber circa 1898
- Born: 25 March 1859; Haarlem
- Died: 30 May 1941 (aged 82); The Hague
- Other names: Rechlindis (pseudonym)
- Occupations: Feminist, historian, author

Johanna Wilhelmina Antoinette Naber (25 March 1859 – 30 May 1941) was a Dutch feminist, historian and author during the first feminist wave. She was one of the three founders of the International Archives for the Women's Movement (1935), now known as Atria Institute on gender equality and women's history, and was herself a prolific author of historical texts about influential women and the women's movement.

== Biography ==
Naber was born in Haarlem to an affluent and intellectual Dutch family. She was the second child and first daughter of rector and (future) professor of philology and classical languages Samuel Adrianus Naber (1828–1913) and his wife Anna Elizabeth L’Honoré (1830–1915). Two of her brothers went on to become professors. The Naber family moved from Zwolle (where they had moved to in 1864) to Amsterdam in 1870. In 1876, Johanna Naber received her HBS diploma after which she continued studying to acquire several teaching certificates. Despite his daughter's ambitions, Samuel Naber did not allow her to study at university. Naber remained unmarried and was therefore expected to stay at home and care for her elderly parents and, later, her unmarried brothers. Naber lived on her own for the first time at age 77. Naber's first book, pertaining to artistic needlework, was published under the pseudonym of Rechlindis in 1887.

== Involvement with the women’s movement ==
Naber's involvement with the Dutch women's movement started in 1896 when she signed up to contribute to the organisation of the National Exhibition on Women's Work. During the exhibition, which took place in 1898, she served as editor and writer for its official magazine Vrouwenarbeid (‘Women’s Work’). Naber went on to become board member and press officer of the Vereeniging voor Vrouwenkiesrecht (the Dutch Organisation for Women's Suffrage). She was one of six Dutch women who were present at the inaugural meeting of the International Woman Suffrage Alliance (IWSA) in Berlin in 1904. She briefly serves as the IWSA's Second Assistant Secretary, but was forced to resign due to her commitments as historian and author. She was involved in the organisation of a second exhibition on women's contributions to society in 1913 and consequently met several times with Dutch queen Wilhelmina who eventually knighted her in the Order of Oranje-Nassau. She was president of the Dutch Women's Council between 1917 and 1922. In her capacity as president, she was also involved with the International Council of Women. In the 1930s, she participated in the (eventually) successful opposition of a bill that proposed to ban married women from working (something she had also successfully opposed in 1910).

== Historian and author ==
Naber was a self-taught historian. During the 1890s, she started publishing on important female historical figures. During her lifetime she published many biographies of noteworthy women as well as works on the early Dutch women's movement in the 19th century. Some notable works include her 1909 Wegbereidsters ('Pioneers') about various women who had paved the way for the women's movement and Frederika Bremer (1901-1865). Naar hare brieven (1921) a biography of Swedish feminist and author Frederika Bremer based on her letters. She furthermore braved an attempt at an overview of the Dutch Women's Movement (entitled Eerste Proeve van een Chronologisch Overzicht van de Geschiedenis der Vrouwenbeweging in Nederland). This text later functioned as an important reference work for fellow IAV-founder Willemijn Posthumus-van der Goot's seminal overview of the Dutch women's movement since the 19th century Van Moeder op Dochter (‘Mother to Daughter’). In 1914, Naber established De Nederlandsche Vrouwengids (‘The Dutch Women’s Guide’) to address women's issues and concerns. The Guide ran until 1919. In 1918, she became the first female board member of the prestigious Maatschappij der Nederlandse Letterkunde or Society of Dutch Literature.

In 1935 she collaborated with Dutch feminists Willemijn Posthumus-van der Goot and Rosa Manus to establish the International Archives for the Women's Movement (IAV), now known as Atria Institute on gender equality and women's history.

== Politics and later life ==
Unlike many of her contemporaries in the women's movement, Naber was a staunch opposer of pacifism and was involved in several organisations that plead for a strong army in the early 1920s. She was a member of the Liberal State Party and her perspective on gender equality was adopted as part of the party's programme.

Naber died at age 82 on 30 May 1941 in the Hague.
