= Wies van Groningen =

Dutch writer and feminist (1929–2022)

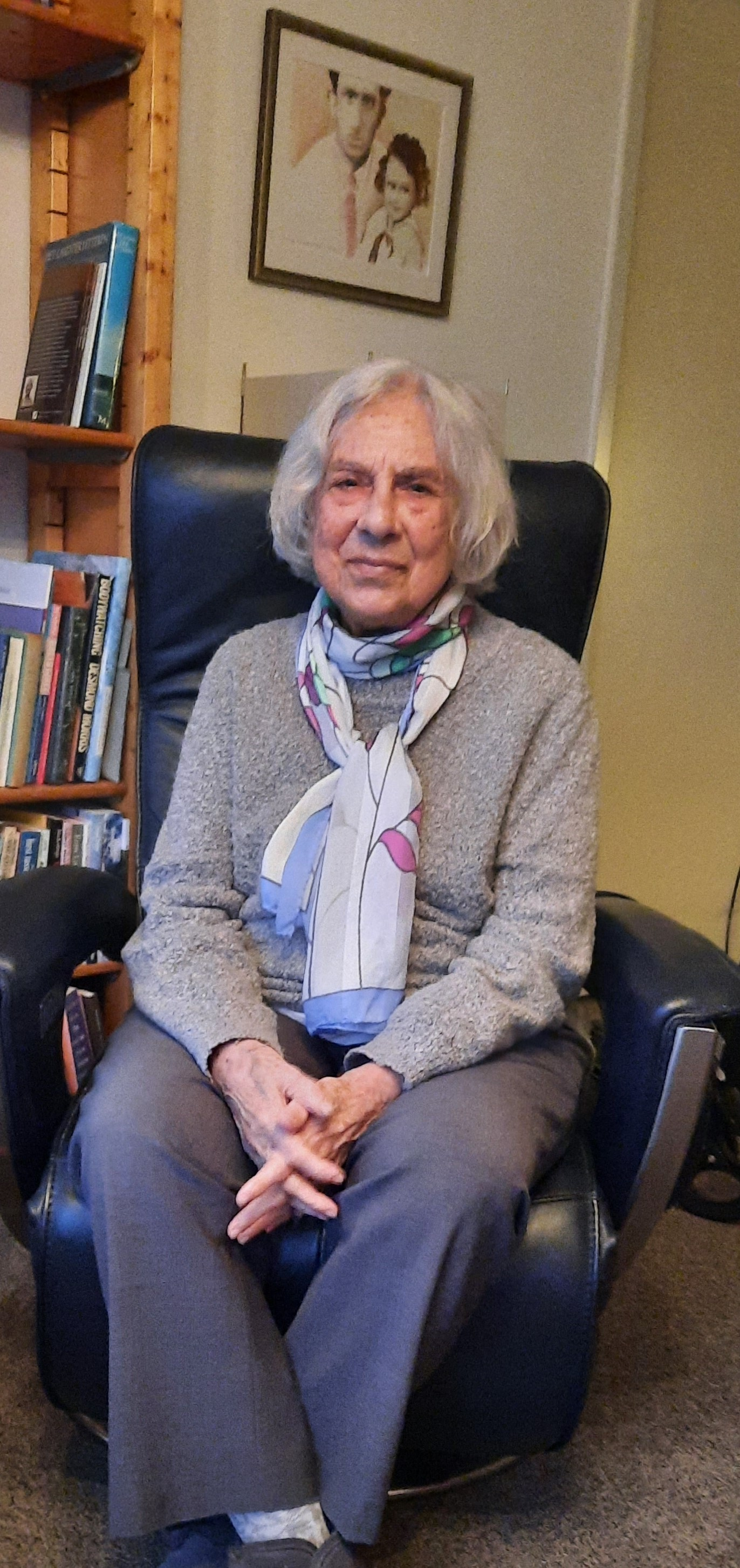
- Wies van Groningen in her apartment in IJsselstein 22 November 2022
- Born: Louise Elizabeth Metaal; 15 March 1929 Blangkejeren, Sumatra, Dutch East Indies
- Died: 30 December 2022 (aged 93) IJsselstein
- Occupation: writer, story collector

Louise Elisabeth (Wies) van Groningen (née Louise Metaal) (15 March 1929 – 30 December 2022), was a Moluccan Dutch writer and story collector. She was active in the Black, migrant and refugee women's movement (zwarte, migranten- en vluchtelingenvrouwen (ZMV) in Dutch) and in the Dutch Moluccan and Indonesian community. Her aim was to improve information for and about ZMV women. She wrote many stories about her ancestors, and encouraged Dutch Indonesian and Moluccan women and men to record the life stories of their ancestors.

== Early life, education and family ==
Louise Elizabeth Metaal, (known as Wies) was born on 15 March 1929 in Blangkejeren, Sumatra, in the Dutch East Indies, daughter of a Moluccan mother, Clara Hukom and a Dutch Royal Netherlands East Indies Army (KNIL) soldier, Barend Nicolaas Jacobus Metaal. She was the second in a family of four children. The family moved with her father's military job and they lived in Batavia, Tjimahi, and Bandung. In 1939, whilst on leave in the Netherlands, her parents decided that because of the impending war, her mother and the children would be better off staying in the Netherlands until her father had completed his last year of service in the East Indies. They settled in Delft, in South Holland. Then the Second World War broke out and Japan occupied the Dutch East Indies. Her father died as a prisoner of war in 1942 as a result of the Dutch East Indies campaign. The family assimilated into the local community in Delft, with little contact with other Moluccan people. The young Wies found this life very strict. At the age of 17, she was shocked to hear her mother speak Malay to some visitors, and didn't understand what she was saying.

Wies Metaal earned an HBS-A degree and worked in the library of Delft University of Technology for a few years. She married Frans Popko van Groningen in 1953 and had four children. She took the name Wies van Groningen. She later attended the PABO-Beeldende Vorming and then taught at a number of primary schools in Utrecht before taking early retirement. In 1973 she travelled through Indonesia with her mother and recalled thinking "I know this, I'm home".

== Women's movement: Black, migrant and refugee women ==
After her early retirement, van Groningen joined the Vrouwenbibliotheek Utrech (Women's Library Utrecht) in 1988. Here, she had a clear goal in mind: to improve the provision of information for and about Black, migrant and refugee women.

She put significant effort into making the collection visible and accessible in the field of ZMVV women. She made many proposals for improving the Women's Thesaurus (a list of terms/keywords to search by subject). In the field of white women's emancipation, this system was a huge improvement on ‘regular’ keyword systems, but often proved unsuitable for information about ZMV women. Wies was an active participant in the national working group working on improving the Women's Thesaurus, exposing blind spots and working to find solutions. She also ensured an increased budget for this part of the collection. She was a member of the supervisory committee of the International Information Centre and Archive for the Women's Movement (IIAV)'s project “Information on Black, Migrant and Refugee Women” from 1992 to 1995.

== Writing and collecting stories ==
Wies van Groningen started writing at the age of 60. Awareness of what she described as her ‘double blood’, which she learnt about through stories from her mother, brought her into the Moluccan community in the 1990s. In 1992 she visited her mother's family home in Oma. She published her first collection in 1995, featuring stories from her mother, Clara Hukom. She elaborated the story further in her autobiographical story Is militair-is militair.

Around 1998, Wies van Groningen switched from the Women's Library Utrecht, to Museum Maluku, the Moluccan Historical Museum. There, she focused on recording women's history, especially that of Moluccan women. In partnership with Christien Hetharia, she interviewed twenty Moluccan women, and published the interviews in Holland ligt niet dicht bij de hemel (Holland is not close to heaven). The women interviewed were Susette Huwae, Coos Ayal, Jossy Keiluhu, Salomina (Mien) Sapuletej-Lawalata, Anna Bathseba de Fretes-Rehatta, Netty Batawangge-Tamonob, Naomi Lawalata-Usmany, Augustien Souisa, Cisca Pattipilohy, Nona Matulessy, Annet Rahantoknam, Farida Pattisahusiwa, Colette Voorwinde, Fientje de Kock-Hully, Monica Akihary, Johanna Tomasowa-Tapilaha.

At the Moluccan Historical Museum, she was active in collecting stories of Moluccan women and men in a project called Meer dan een verhaal (More than a story). A public appeal was made inviting people to send in short stories about their Moluccan grandparents. Many stories were submitted and two collections of short stories were published, Meer dan een verhaal and Luister naar mijn verhaal. In 2010, van Groningen led the publication of Pasar Cerita a new collection of stories with memories not only of Moluccans, but also of people from Indonesia and the Dutch East Indies.

Wies van Groningen continued to write into her 90s. Her last book, Vertellingen uit een koloniaal verleden, was published in 2021, a year before her death. In it she told the life story of her grandmother Louisa Hukom, who earned her living as a seamstress on the Maluku Islands after being abandoned by her husband. Louisa Hukom's life had previously been described in the story ‘De goede slang’ (The good snake), by Dutch-Indonesian writer Maria Dermoût (1888–1962), whose family she had worked for.

Wies van Groningen spoke several times on Radio Oras, the Moluccan voice in Amsterdam and surroundings in 2021. One interview was repeated on 15 January 2023 following the announcement of her death (at 33 minutes in).

Wies van Groningen died in IJsselstein on 30 December 2022.

== Recognition ==
In 2000, van Groningen received the ZAMI award for her story ‘Over grenzen heen’. The judges wrote: "Met een minimum aan woorden weet de schrijfster sfeervol, poëtisch en suggestief zonder zweverigheid haar verhaal te vertellen. Haar stijl kenmerkt zich door een bijzondere cadans, bijna bezwerend van uitwerking. Aldus wordt de orale verteltraditie, zoals de auteur deze uit de Indische cultuur kent, schriftelijk vastgelegd’ (With a minimum of words, the writer manages to tell her story atmospherically, poetically and suggestively... Her style is characterised by a special cadence, almost incantatory in its effect. Thus the oral narrative tradition, as the author knows it from Indonesian culture, is recorded in writing).

== Publications ==
- Clara Hukom. Verhalen uit Blangkedjerèn (Stories from Blangkedjerèn) 1995.
- Het gaat om meer dan boeken op de plank. (It's more than books on the shelf) In: Zamikrant, jrg 4 (1995), nr 7, p. 10-12
- Interview met een ‘vergeten’ migrantenvrouw (Interview with a ‘forgotten’ migrant woman)(with Cisca Pattipilohy). In: Zamikrant, 1995, nr 8. P.9-11 (Interview with Lien Kapuw)
- Om een pakje tabak, Toehan jang kasih en De kris, In: Oost-Indische inkt: 400 jaar Indië in de Nederlandse letteren; (400 years of the East Indies in Dutch literature) edited by Alfred Birney. Amsterdam/Antwerpen, 1998, p. 557
- Meer dan een verhaal (More than a story) (ed.). Utrecht, 1998
- Luister naar mijn verhaal (Listen to my story) (ed.). Utrecht 1999
- Kruidnagelen en nootmuskaat. In: Vertrouwd en vreemd. Ontmoetingen tussen Nederland, Indië, en Indonesië. (Cloves and nutmeg in Familiar and strange. Encounters between the Netherlands, the East Indies, and Indonesia). Hilversum, 2000.
- Clara Hukom; verhalen uit Blangkedjerèn. Is militair, is militair (Clara Hukom; stories from Blangkedjerèn. Is military, is military). Utrecht, 2000.
- Holland ligt niet dicht bij de hemel; interviews met Molukse vrouwen. (Holland is not close to heaven; interviews with Moluccan women) (with Christien Hetharia). Utrecht, 2003
- Mijn vader zat ook bij het KNIL. (My father was also in the KNIL) Utrecht, 2005. ISBN 90-809395-1-X
- Manusela; reisverhaal van Leonor Pattinasarany (Manusela; the story Leonor Pattinasarany's travels), Landelijk Steunpunt Educatie Molukkers, 2009
- Pasar Cerita (ed.). Utrecht, Pasar BUKU, 2010
- Mijn voormoeders van de Molukken (My foremothers of the Moluccas). Boekscout, 2014 ISBN 978-9402207309
- Vertellingen over een koloniaal verleden (Tales of a colonial past). Utrecht, 2021

=== Bibliography ===
- PATTYNAMA, Pamela, De dramatiek van de waardigheid; over Clara Hukom, verhalen over Blangkedjeren, ZAMI newspaper, 1995, no. 8, pp 41–46
- SERIESE, Edy. Indische verteltraditie voortgezet. Wies van Groningen vertelt de verhalen van haar moeder. In: De Pasar newspaper, 4 March 1995, pp. 4.
- BIRNEY, Alfred. Wies van Groningen. Oost-Indische inkt, 400 jaar Indië in de Nederlandse letteren (Amsterdam/Antwerpen,1998.pag. 557. ISBN 978-9025497811
- ASDONCK, Marjolein. Schrijven dwingt mij goed over mijzelf na te denken." Een portret van Wies van Groningen. Moesson, onafhankelijk Indisch tijdschrift, December 2000, pp. 22-25
- STRAVER, H. Wies van Groningen. In: Wonder en geweld; de Molukken in de verbeelding van vertellers en schrijvers. Part 2. LSEM, Utrecht 2007. P. 234-241. ISBN 9789076729459
