= Mihaela Miroiu =

Romanian philosopher (born 1955)

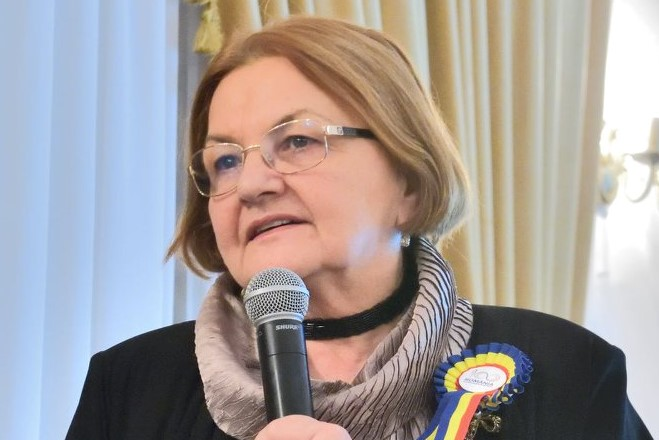
- Mihaela Miroiu in 2018
- Born: 10 March 1955 (age 71); Hunedoara, Romanian People's Republic

Academic background
- Education: University of Bucharest

Academic work
- Discipline: Philosophy
- Sub-discipline: Philosophy of mind Feminism; Human rights
- Institutions: National University of Political Studies and Public Administration

Mihaela Miroiu (born 10 March 1955) is a Romanian political theorist and feminist philosopher, the most prominent activist for women's rights and a very well known activist for Roma rights and, more generally, for the rights of minorities. She is currently a professor of Political science at the Faculty of Political Science, National University of Political Studies and Public Administration, Bucharest.

She was and is involved in numerous institutional, civic and political contributions for setting and development of political science and democratization in Romania. She introduced the first Ph.D. program in Political Science in Romania in 2000, the first courses in Gender Studies in 1994, and the first Masters in Gender Studies in 1998.

== Early life and career ==
Mihaela Miroiu was born in Hunedoara, Romania. She studied Philosophy at the Faculty of Philosophy, University of Bucharest, earning a BA in 1978 and a PhD in 1978. She is married to Adrian Miroiu, Professor of Political Science at NSPSPA. At the beginning of her career, Miroiu taught philosophy in various high schools in Bucharest. In 1994 she became a lecturer at the Faculty of Political Science at the National University of Political Studies and Public Administration, Bucharest and associate professor at the Faculty of Philosophy, University of Bucharest, teaching Feminist Philosophy. She was dean of the Faculty of Political Science, 1997–2001. She initiated feminist studies (1994) and gender studies (1998). In 2001 she introduced and coordinated the first Romanian collection of Gender Studies at Polirom publishing house. She initiated two non-governmental organizations: ANA Society for Feminist Analyses in 1995 and Curriculum Development Center and Gender Studies – FILIA in 2000.

Miroiu has won several research grants at major universities, such as Cornell University, USA in 1994; at Central European University, Budapest, Hungary in 1994, 1995, 1996; Warwick University in 1997; at New Europe College, Bucharest between 1998 and 1999; St. Hilda's College, Oxford University, Great Britain 2002; and between 2003 and 2004 a Fulbright research grant at the Department of Political Science, Indiana University, Bloomington, USA.

She coordinated research grants on gender issues in partnership with several European and American institutions: the Institute for Advanced Studies, Vienna, UNESCO, New Europe College, SNSPA, Babeș-Bolyai University, Konrad Adenauer Foundation, ERSTE Foundation, FRAGEN IIAV, International Information Centre and Archives for the Women's Movement, Indiana University, Bloomington.

She has lectured as a visiting professor at Cornell University, New School for Social Research, Central European University, Budapest, Manchester University, Warwick University, Indiana University, OSF Moldova, University of Santander, University of Vienna, Stockholm University, and the University of Gothenburg. She received numerous awards, including Women Inspiring Europe, European Institute for Gender Equality, 2010, Brussels; Outstanding Achievements Award, Association for Women in Slavic Studies Eurasian and East-European Studies (AWSS), 2010; Excellence in Teaching offered by the National Alliance of Student Organizations in Romania, 2007; award for Promoting Equality of Opportunities in Romania, National Council for Preventing and Combating Discrimination, Bucharest, 2005; for promoting women's rights, Woman of the Year, 2005, Avantaje Magazine. She is also an Honorary Citizen of Hunedoara, Hunedoara County, since 2017.

== Civic and political contributions ==
As a women's rights activist and public intellectual, Miroiu is the author of numerous papers and policy proposals for democratization and the rule of law, as well as anti-discrimination, equal opportunity, and minorities' rights. She has played an important role as adviser and trainer for the democratic political parties concerning political ethics, ideologies and gender policies. She played an important role as lobbyist for The law of parental leave (1998), The law against discrimination (2000), The law for fighting violence against women. She also lobbied for the introduction of the principle of equal opportunity in the Romanian Constitution (2003) and for setting up of the Romanian National Agency for Equal Opportunities and promoted the ratification of the Istanbul Convention in Romania. Miroiu is still lobbing at present for gender parity in local, national, and European elections, equal pay for equal work, equity among salaries between masculinized and feminized domains, and rural women's access to water and heating facilities.

She has been involved, as a public intellectual, in writing numerous articles and public policy papers for democratization and the rule of law, as well against discrimination and equal opportunities in Romanian cultural and political journals such as Dilema veche, Revista 22, Observator Cultural, Adevărul, Gândul, and Avantaje. She was involved in the critical analysis of Romanian politics and policies in cultural and political debate programs on television, such as TVR, Pro TV, Realitatea TV, and Antena 1. In the last decade she is best known as an advocate and influencer in favor of the same causes on the social network Facebook; she is the most influential public female intellectual fighting for the observance of women's and minorities dignity and rights. Since the very beginning of the process of democratization, Miroiu was an active participant and influencer in protests for decommunization, democratization, and the rule of law. Since 2000 she is directly involved in protests for gender justice, for fighting violence against women, for miniorites' rights, and for environmental causes.

== Contributions to social issues ==
Miroiu has made numerous contributions to democratic culture, political theory, gender studies, ethics and education. By writing in 1995 The Thought of the Shadow, she became the first Romanian feminist philosopher, criticizing the philosophic postmodernism from a feminist perspective. In this book, Miroiu analyzes the alliance and mésalliance between feminism and philosophy, including Romanian philosophy, arguing in favor of philosophical reassessment of the feminine and the womanly, in the context of a culture still dominated by dichotomies and the idea that women are rather treated as "shadows of philosophical thought".

In 1996 she wrote Convenio. On Nature, Women and Morals, a book from the perspective of Feminist Ethics and developed her own theoretical perspective in Ethics through the theory of the convenient. This philosophical perspective on morality is seen as "the particular approach in the context of feminist ethics," but by the type of arguments, tackles many other theoretical perspectives on morality: Kantianism, utilitarianism, ethics of rights, Rawls's theory of justice and its critics, as well as ethics of care.

In 1997 she published with Vladimir Pasti and Cornel Codiță the book Romania. Matter of Facts – a diagnosis of the evolution of the Romanian society (which she characterizes as a "survival society" with a "show-room democracy"). In 1999 she publishes The Backward-Looking Society, a book in which she analysis the ideological and political tendencies of the post-communist society, as a "cocktail of conservatisms," a dominant combination between left-conservatism, represented by the socialists, well supported by the majority of the electorate in terms of deindustrialization, loss of status and employment; and right-conservatism, represented by National Liberal Party and National Peasant Party, also dominant in the mainstream of public intellectuals. In 2000 she initiates the theorization and analysis of leftist conservatism internationally, in the context of the XVIII-lea International Congress of Political Science Association (IPSA), in Quebec with the paper "Poverty, Authority and Leftist Conservatism." Also in 1997, she coordinated with Laura Grunberg books on gender studies such as Gender and Education and Gender and Society.

In 2004, she published The Road to Autonomy. Feminist Political Theories, the first book of feminist political theories by a Romanian author. In this work, Miroiu analyzes the evolution and trends of feminist theories and political movements, including Romania in the general research context. In 2002, she and Otilia Dragomir edited the book Feminist Lexicon, a dictionary that has the role to initiate in the study of Romanian feminist authors, publications, and women's movements. In 2003 she wrote the first guide of policies that promote gender equity in higher education in Eastern Europe - Guidelines for Promoting Gender Equity in Higher Education in Central and Eastern Europe. She contributed to the affiliation of Gender studies at ATHENA European Network for Gender Studies in 2002. She has also implemented gender policies projects for the Romanian Ministry of Education. She coordinated the Gender Barometer, with Renate Weber (2000), the first national research in regard to the perceptions, relations and roles on gender in the Romanian society. She edited with Maria Bucur the book Patriarchy and Emancipation in the Romanian Political Thought (2002), Birth. Living Histories with Otilia Dragomir (2010) and the book Feminist and Environmentalist Movements in Romania (2015).

Miroiu introduced the classes of Political Ethics in 1997 and, in collaboration with Gabriela Blebea, wrote the first book on Professional Ethics in 2001. Significant for her constant interest for an ethical perspective in Political Theories and Gender Policies is that she used a grid of Political Ethics in the design of the analysis in the book Contemporary Political Ideologies (2012). She was also interested in the analysis of how political actors used conflicts derived from strategies of lustration in Romania. She has also coordinated a first national research about Ethics inside Romanian universities and the draft code of ethics adopted by the Ministry of Education in 2005. She has taught a course on Applied Ethics at the Psychology Masters at Babeș-Bolyai, between 2000 and 2011. She currently teaches Ethics in International Relations at SNSPA.

Regarding educational politics, Miroiu has contributed to the reform of the Philosophy curricula in high school after the fall of communism. She coordinated the first Philosophy handbook in 1993, which was published for seven years afterwards. She coordinated the first handbook of Civic Culture for high school – Civic Culture, Democracy, Human Rights, Tolerance in 1995. Other important publications are those analyzing educational policies, such as the book The Romanian Education Today, (co-author with Gabriel Ivan, Vladimir Pasti, Adrian Miroiu) and the analysis of gender policies in education, through international grants – The Gender Dimension of Education in Romania, Institute for Advanced Studies, Viena (2001) and Case Study on Gender-sensitive Educational policy and Practice, SNSPA (2003) and the book Guidelines for Promoting Gender Equity in Higher Education in Central and Eastern Europe (2003).

Mihaela Mioriu drew on literary writing ever since she was in high school. She continued to write literature, first for her friends – Stories about Cadmav – in the 1980s, but she published the short stories and the novel only after 1990. In 2005, with Mircea Miclea she published the autobiographical book The R'East and the West and With my own Woman Mind (2017).

== Critics ==
A series of critics arose from other feminists, many of them Eastern European, and they refer to the fact that she rejects the idea of compatibility between feminism and communism, as long as women could not freely associate, express their own interests and change the cultural, civic and political agenda. The most significant dispute in regard to these arguments was in Aspasia International Yearbook of Central, Eastern and Southeastern European Women's and Gender History, Volume I, New York, 2007, in the context put to debate by Miroiu "Communism was a State Patriarchy, not a State Feminism." A series of authors criticize her perspective - like Krassimira Daskalova, Elena Gapova, Angelika Passara - while others review their own perspectives assumed in the 1970s in regard to the relation between feminism and Marxism.

Critics related to Miroiu's approach to liberal feminism (in the relation with ethical welfare type of feminism), respectively with the risks of an approach less close with the role of the welfare state and the policies of protecting women are also brought by Anca Gheauș. This inclination is however regarded as contextually reasonable by Nanette Funk.

Andreea Molocea (2015, 31) in "(Re)construcția feminismului românesc (1999–2000)" speaks of Romanian feminism as being closely connected with academia, due to the fact the majority of early feminists were coming from the academic sphere. Thus, the activists tended to limit their diversity of action and were rather open to Western feminist theories. Having the tendency to report to and to signal issues in conformity with their status and perspectives, the early feminists omitted the issues of poor women, confronting with the difficulties of the market transition, issues that these feminists knew less about because they had never been researched. This is also due to the lack of rural NGOs or activities targeted and representing women from such areas (Molocea 2015, 34). Another critic relies on Romanian liberal feminism that tended to be homogeneous and generally focused on the rights, liberties, and autonomy of women and its lack of intersectionality with ethnicity, class, or sexual orientation (Vlad 2015). Also the professionalization of the women's movement and the lack of contact with the women that feminism represents is another criticism. Miroiu answers these critics in the book studying the analysis of women's and environmental movements from Romania, as well as international critics in the study "On Women, Feminism and Democracy" vol. Post-Communist Romania at Twenty-Five. Linking Past, Present and Future (Stan and Vancea eds, 2015).

As for her activity as an women's rights activist, Mihaela Miroiu was criticized for taking a passive stance towards certain acts of sexual harassment that were brought to her attention by one of her students at the National University of Political Studies and Public Administration (SNSPA). The acts of sexual harassment Professor Marius Pieleanu was accused of took place, allegedly, in the early 2000s, when the Faculty of Political Science of SNSPA, of which he is a member, was led by Adrian Miroiu, Mihaela Miroiu's husband. She responded to the criticism by claiming that at the time of those incidents no university code of ethics was in place to provide specific procedures for the sanctioning of sexual harassment.

== Selected works ==
=== Books ===
- Gândul Umbrei: Abordari feministe în filosofia contemporana [The Thought of the Shadow: Feminist Approaches in Contemporary Philosophy] Bucharest: Alternative Publ. House, 1995
- Convenio: Despre natura, femei si morala [Convenio: On Nature, Women and Morals] Bucharest: Alternative Publ. House, 1996 translated in Macedonian, Skopje, 2005
- România. Starea de fapt [Romania. Matter of facts], Bucharest: Nemira, 1997 (co-authored with V. Pasti and Cornel Codita)
- Învatamantul romanesc azi [The Romanian Education Today], (co-authored with Gabriel Ivan, Vladimir Pasti, Adrian Miroiu), Iași: Polirom, 1998
- Societatea Retro [The Backward-Looking Society], Bucharest: "Trei" Pub. House, 1996
- Introducere în etică profesională [Professional Ethics, an Introduction], Bucharest: "Trei" Pub. House, 2001 (co-author with Gabriela Blebea)
- The Gender Dimension of Education in Romania, SOCO Project Paper No. 83 Vienna www.iwm.at/publ-spp/soco83pp.pdf
- Guidelines for Promoting Gender Equity in Higher Education in Central and eastern Europe, CEPES, UNESCO, Bucharest, 2003; The Romanian version: Politici ale echitatii de gen. Ghid pentru invatamintul universitar din Europa Centrala si de Est. Politeia, Bucharest, 2003. Translated in Bulgarian, 2008
- Drumul către autonomie:Teorii politice feministe [The Road to Autonomy: Feminist Political Theories] Iași: Polirom, 2004
- R'estul și Vestul [The rest and the West] Iași: Polirom, 2005 (co-author with Mircea Miclea/ autobiographical novel)
- Neprețuitele femei [Priceless women] Iași: Polirom, 2006 (articles in reviews and journals)
- Dicolo de ingeri și draci. Etica în politica românească [Beside angels and demons] Iași: Polirom, 2007 (articles in reviews and journals)
- The Birth of Democratic Citizenship (co-author Maria Bucur), Indiana University Press, Bloomington, 2018

=== Edited books ===
- Ghid de idei politice [Guide to political ideas] Bucharest: Pan-Terra 1990 (Coeditor with Adrian Miroiu)
- Sophia, Reader for the Philosophy Faculty, Universitatea Bucharest, 1995
- Jumătatea anonimă [The Anonymous Half. Anthology of Feminist Philosophy] Bucharest: Șansa, 1995
- Gen și Educație [Gender and education] Bucharest: ANA, 1997
- Gen și societate [Gender and society] Bucharest: Alternative, 1997
- Gender Barometer (coed. Renate Weber). Open Society Foundation and Gallup Organization (Bucharest), 2000 (with Renate Weber)
- The Gender Dimension of Education in Romania, SOCO project Paper No.83, IWN Policy Project (Vienna), 2000
- Lexicon feminist [Feminist lexicon] Iași: Polirom, 2002 (co-editor with Otilia Dragomir)
- Patriarhat și emancipare în gândirea politică românească[Patriarchate and emancipation in the Romanian political thought] Iași: Polirom, 2002 (co-editor with Maria Bucur)
- Nașterea. Istorii trăite [The birth. The experienced history] Iași: Polirom 2010 (with Otilia Dragomir)
- Ideologii politice actuale. Semnificații, evoluții și impact [Contemporary political ideologies] Iași: Polirom, 2012
- Mișcări feministe și ecologiste în România (1990–2014) [Feminist and ecologic movements in Romania from 1990 to 2014] Iași:Polirom, 2015

=== Textbooks ===
- Filosofie. Manual pentru licee (Philosophy. Handbook for High Schools), Editura Didactica si Pedagogica, 1986–1989, "The Theory of Knowledge".
- Lecții de filosofie[Philosophy lessons] Bucharest: Humanitas, 1990
- Filosofie. Manual pentru licee [Philosophy. Textbook for highshool pupils] Bucharest: Editura Didactică și pedagogică, 1992, "The human condition"
- Filosofie. Teme de studiu pentru licee (Philosophy. Study Topics for High Schools), Editura Didactica si pedagogica, Bucharest, 1993–1998, "Happiness", "Philosophy" (author and co-coordinator)
- Cultură civică. Democrație, Drepturile Omului. Toleranță [Civic culture. Democracy. Human rights. Tolerance] Bucharest:Editura Didactică și pedagogică, 1995, "Tolerance", "Prejudices" (author and co-coordinator)
- Filosofia, fericirea, dreptatea [Philosophy, happiness, justice] Bucharest: All, 1997
- Filosofie. Teme de studiu pentru licee [Philosophy. Studying themes for highschool pupils] Bucharest: Editura Didactică și pedagogică, 1998
- Filosofia, fericirea, dreptatea, Dumnezeu [Philosophy, happiness, justice, God] Bucharest: All, 1999
- Etica politica, Distance learning (Political Ethics, Handbook for Students and Reader), electronic format, www.politice. ro. Political Science Faculty, NSPSA, Bucharest, 2002/2005
- Teorii politice feministe (Feminist Political Theories. Handbook for Students and Reader), electronic format, www.politice. ro. Political Science Faculty, NSPSA, Bucharest, 2002/2005

=== National and international research journals ===
- "From Pseudo-Power to Lack of Power", European Journal of Women's Studies, Sage Publications, no. 1, 1994, pp. 107–100
- "Ana's Land. The Right to be Sacrificed", Ana's Land, Sisterhood in Eastern Europe, Westwiew Press Publications (Boulder), 1996, pp. 136–40
- "All in One: Fairness, Neutrality and Conservatism – A Case Study of Romania", Prospects, vol. XXXIV, no. 1, 2004, pp. 85–100
- "Post-Totalitarian Pre-Feminism", (coauthor Liliana Popescu), Romania since 1989. Politics, Economics and Society, Henry F. Carey (Ed.), Lexington Books (Maryland), 2004, pp. 297–314
- "State Men, Market Women", Feminismos, Muyer y participation politica, Universita Alicante, Numero 3, 2004, pp. 84–99
- "Communism was a State Patriarchy, not a State Feminism", Aspasia. International Yearbook of Central, Eastern and Southeastern European Women's and Gender History, Volume I, 2007, pp. 197–201.
- "An Exotic Island: Feminist Philosophy in Romania", Signs: Journal of Women in Culture and Society, Vol. 34, No. 2, 2009, pp. 233–239
- "Not the Right Moment. Politic of the Delay", Women's History Review, Routledge, Issue 1, Vol. 18, 2010, pp. 575–593
- "A Mind of Our Own. Gender Studies in Romania", Aspasia. International Yearbook of Central, Eastern and Southeastern European Women's and Gender History, Volume 4, 2010, pp. 167–176
- "The Politics of Domestic Violence in Postcommunist Europe and Eurasia", Local Activism, National Policies, and Global Forces, Katalin Fábián (Ed.), Indiana University Press (Bloomington), 2010,'Perspectives on Politics Review. Nr, 9, Vol. 2, 2011, pp 461–463
- "Guidelines for Promoting Gender-Inclusive Curriculum in Higher Education", From Gender Studies to Gender in Studies. Case Studies on Gender Inclusive Curriculum in Higher Education, Laura Grunberg Ed., CEPES UNESCO (Bucharest), 2011, pp. 227–246
- "Morality in Politics, or the Politics of Morality ? "Neo–Purification" in Romania", Applied Ethics. Perspectives from Romania, Mureșan Valentin and Shunzo Majima (Eds.), Hokkaido University Press, 2013, 209-228
- "Feminism and Ethical Liberalism: Reflections on Postcommunist Transition", Global Capitalism, Socialist Markets and Feminist Interventions Shanghai University (Shanghai), 2014, pp. 230–257
- "On Women, Feminism and Democracy", Post-Communist Romania at Twenty-Five. Linking Past, Present and Future Stan, Lavinia and Diane Vancea (Eds.), Lexington Books (New York), 2015, pp. 83–102

== Sources ==
- Interview in Gardianul
- Interview in Dilema Veche
- Ghodsee, Kristen R. (July–August 2011). "On feminism, philosophy and politics in Post-communist Romania: An interview with Mihaela Miroiu (Bucharest, 17 May 2010)". Women's Studies International Forum. 34 (4): 302–307. doi:10.1016/j.wsif.2011.04.005.
- TV Show with Mihaela Miroiu on Realitatea TV, Drama femeii moderne part I
- Stroe, Marian. "Recenzii și Note de lectura" en Revista Română de Sociologie, series 9, year XIX, nr. 3–4, p. 347–349, București, 2008
