= Mien van Wulfften Palthe =

Dutch feminist and pacifist (1875–1960)

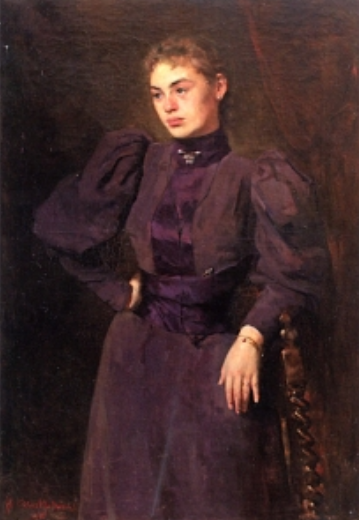
- Palthe-Broese by Floris Arntzenius (1896)
- Born: Frederika Wilhelmina Broese van Groenou; 1 April 1875; Djokjakarta, Dutch East Indies, Kingdom of the Netherlands
- Died: 11 November 1960 (aged 85); The Hague, The Netherlands
- Other names: Frederika Wilhelmina van Wulfften Palthe-Broese van Groenou, Mien Palthe-Broese, Mien van Wulfften Palthe-Broese van Groenou
- Occupations: actress, women's rights and peace activist
- Years active: 1900–1940

Mien van Wulfften Palthe (1 April 1875 – 11 November 1960; Broese van Groenou) was a Dutch feminist and pacifist. As a member of the Vereeniging voor Vrouwenkiesrecht (Society for Women's Suffrage) and Women's International League for Peace and Freedom, she strove to secure enfranchisement for women and worked as an advocate for peace.

== Early years ==
Frederika Wilhelmina Broese van Groenou was born on 1 April 1875 in Djokjakarta, Dutch East Indies, part of the Kingdom of the Netherlands to Jeannetta Emilia (née Wieseman) and Wolter Broese van Groenou. She was the oldest of the seven siblings and her father was serving in the Royal Dutch East Indies Army at the time of her birth. In 1878, he left the military and became director of a sugar company and managed the Tandjong Tirto factory. Broese and her next youngest sister, Miel were sent to live and attend school in The Hague in 1883. The rest of the family joined them there in 1890 and established a household. Wolter continued to manage the Javanese sugar plant from the Netherlands and as a liberal who believed in women's suffrage and world peace, he encouraged his daughters in attaining their education.

In 1891, Broese was sent to Allenswood Boarding Academy, an exclusive girls' school in Wimbledon, London. Enrolling in the Haagsche Kookschool (Hague Cooking School) the following year, she took classes there before deciding to obtain her Lower Education Act Certificate in 1893. Though able to teach school with the certificate, Broese wanted to be an actress and though initially her parents did not approve they finally gave consent. Between 1898 and her graduation in 1900, she attended the Amsterdam Theater School.

== Career ==
Upon completing her schooling in 1900, Broese adopted the stage name Wilma and debuted in Friedrich Schiller's play Mary Stuart with the Rotterdam Theater Company. She performed with this theater troupe for two years and then switched to the Netherlands Theater Company, where she performed for an additional year. On 12 May 1903, Broese married Jan Richard van Wulfften Palthe, director of industrial textile firm specializing in dying and laundering. Settling in the Van Stolkweg neighborhood of The Hague, Broese gave up theater and focused on raising the couple's three sons: "Wolter (1905), Richard (1907) and Joachim Adolf (1908)".

Broese's active involvement with women's suffrage began in 1908. Up to that point, she had been apathetic to the cause, but when the International Woman Suffrage Alliance scheduled their 4th conference to be held in Amsterdam, her family donated six hundred guilders (the equivalent of around €7,000 or $8,000 US in 2016 currency), to provide assistance for foreign attendants' travel expenses and lodging. During the conference, she and her sister Miel, hosted teas for the conventioners and Broese met Aletta Jacobs, who would become a close friend for the remainder of her life.

After the Conference, Broese became dedicated to the cause of women's enfranchisement and joined the Vereeniging voor Vrouwenkiesrecht (Society for Women's Suffrage). From 1915, she served as chair of The Hague branch's chapter committee of promulgation and hosted a booth to disseminate information about women's suffrage each Monday in the market near the intersection of the Brouwersgracht and Prinsengracht canals. That same year, she participated in the Women's Conference at The Hague, which occurred between 28 April and 1 May, to protest World War I and develop a plan to prevent war in the future. Broese chaired the committee to provide accommodations for those attending the conference and met influential foreign feminists like the Hungarian sisters, Franciska and Rosika Schwimmer. An organization was formed at the conference which would become the Women's International League for Peace and Freedom (WILPF).

When the congress ended two delegations of women were formed to meet with European heads state over the next several months. Jane Addams and Jacobs led one group of women while Rosika Schwimmer and Chrystal Macmillan led another. The women who made up the delegations included Broese, Emily Greene Balch, Rosa Genoni, Alice Hamilton, Lola Maverick Lloyd, Cornelia Ramondt-Hirschmann, and Julia Grace Wales and were divided according to whether their countries were involved in the war. Those from countries who were active combatants visited neutral countries and those who were from countries which were neutral visited the governments of countries involved in the war. The women secured agreement from reluctant Foreign Ministers, who overall felt that a mediating body would be ineffective. Nevertheless, they agreed to participate, or not impede creation of a neutral mediating body, if other nations agreed and if President Woodrow Wilson would initiate a body. In the midst of the war, Wilson refused.

In 1918, Broese used her theatrical talents to present a performance for the Hague chapter of the Vereeniging voor Vrouwenkiesrecht, parodying Parliamentary actions concerning women's suffrage. The following year at the Women's Peace Congress held between 12 and 17 May in Zurich, she was one of the featured speakers, just four months before Queen Wilhelmina signed into law women's right to vote. Shortly thereafter, she and her husband helped Aletta Jacobs move to The Hague and provided her with financial support, as she had lost her earnings due to poor investments. For the remainder of her life, Jacobs was financially supported by Broese and her family.

Once the suffrage fight was won, Broese turned her energies toward the peace movement. In 1924, she became treasurer of the national branch of the WILPF. That same year, she helped organize the festivities to celebrate Jacob's 70th birthday. When Jacobs died in 1929, Broese was designated as her sole heir. She provided a burial space in her family's mausoleum in Loenen op de Veluwe for Jacobs and worked to create a monument in Driehuis to join Jacobs' remains with her husband, Carel Victor Gerritsen's remains. Gerritsen and Jacobs' remains were reinterred at this monument in Westerveld Cemetery in 1931. She continued as treasurer of the Dutch branch of the WILPF until 1940.

== Death and legacy ==
Broese died on 11 November 1960 from leukemia. She was buried in the Broese family estate of Groenouwe. As Jacobs' heir, Broese donated the papers of Aletta Jacobs to Rosa Manus one of the founders of the International Archives for the Women's Movement. The majority of the papers were looted by the Nazis in 1940 and not returned to the Netherlands until a decade after they were rediscovered in a secret archive in Russia in 1992. Jacobs' papers now are housed at the Atria Institute in Amsterdam, as are Broese's archival records.

== See also ==
- List of peace activists
