= Mineke Bosch =

Professor of Modern History at the University of Groningen

- Born: 1954 (age 71–72); Pretoria, South Africa

Academic background
- Education: University of Groningen; Erasmus University of Rotterdam
- Thesis: Het geslacht van de wetenschap. Vrouwen en hoger onderwijs in Nederland, 1878-1948 (The gender of science: women and higher education in the Netherlands, 1878-1948)
- Doctoral advisor: Prof. dr. H. van Dijk, EUR; Prof. dr. S. Sevenhuijsen, UU

Academic work
- Discipline: Modern History
- Institutions: University of Groningen

Cornelia Wilhelmina (Mineke) Bosch (born 1954) is a Dutch historian born in South Africa. She is Professor of Modern History at the University of Groningen in the Netherlands.

== Early life ==
Mineke Bosch was born in Pretoria, South Africa on 2 July 1954. She studied history at the University of Groningen and then received her PhD (cum laude) from Erasmus University Rotterdam in 1994. It was titled The gender of science: women and higher education in the Netherlands 1878-1948.

== Career ==
Mineke Bosch's research focuses on history of science, women's and gender history, international women's movements and (auto)biography. She is the author of a biography (An Unwavering Faith in Justice: Aletta Jacobs 1854-1929) of Aletta Jacobs, the first woman to attend a Dutch university officially and campaigner for women's suffrage. According to Bosch, "I think Aletta Jacobs would fully agree with the # MeToo movement - although of course I can't speak for her."

Bosch travelled to Moscow with Myriam Everard in 1994 in order to assess if any works from the International Archives for the Women's Movement could be recovered.

Between 1998 and 2007 Bosch was Associate Professor in the Centre for Gender and Diversity at the University of Maastricht. She was appointed to the centre's special chair in Gender and Science. Her inaugural lecture was entitled The burden of tradition: Gender and the culture of memory in science.

Bosch became Professor of Modern History at the University of Groningen in 2008.

== Suffrage exhibition ==
To mark 100 years of universal suffrage in the Netherlands, Bosch and Egge Knol have organised an exhibition called Battle! 100 years of women's suffrage (Strijd! 100 jaar vrouwenkiesrecht) at the Groninger Museum.

== Selected publications ==
- Bosch, M. (2019 forthcoming) Strijd!: de vrouwenkiesrechtbeweging in woord en beeld, 1882-1922
- Bosch, M. (2005) Een onwrikbaar geloof in rechtvaardigheid: Aletta Jacobs 1854-1929 Balans ISBN 9789460030321.
- Bosch, M. & Kloosterman, A. (1985) Lieve Dr. Jacobs. Brieven uit de Wereldbond voor Vrouwenkiesrecht, 1902-1942 Feministische Uitgeverij Sara
