= Francisca de Haan =

Dutch gender historian

Francisca de Haan is a Dutch historian who specializes in women's and gender history. From 2002 until 2022, she has taught at the Central European University, first in Budapest and since 2020 located in Vienna, where she is now Professor Emerita of Gender Studies and History, as well as being a fellow at the International Institute of Social History in Amsterdam. Her publications include A Biographical Dictionary of Women's Movements and Feminisms: Central, Eastern, and South Eastern Europe, 19th and 20th Centuries (2006) and she is the founding editor of Aspasia: The International Yearbook of Central, Eastern and South Eastern European Women’s and Gender History (since 2007). From 2005 to 2010, de Haan was vice-president of the International Federation for Research in Women's History.

Brought up in the Netherlands in a family which included several independent, unmarried teachers, De Haan aspired to become a teacher from an early age. She later developed an interest in history and in an academic career. After graduating as an M.A. at the University of Amsterdam in 1985, she earned a doctorate in history from the Erasmus University of Rotterdam in 1992. Her PhD thesis was awarded with a Study-Prize of the Praemium Erasmianum Foundation and was published in English in 1998.

With the notable exception of her book about the Dutch Jewish van Gelderen family (Een eigen patroon. Geschiedenis van een joodse familie en haar bedrijven, ca. 1800-1964, published in 2002), De Haan's work is devoted almost exclusively to the women's movement. These include a co-authored book about Elizabeth Fry and Josephine Butler in Britain and The Netherlands; a co-edited volume about women's activism; and another co-edited volume about Rosa Manus, in 1935 the founding president of the International Archives for the Women's Movement in Amsterdam (now called Atria), and a long-term vice-president of the International Alliance of Women. She has taken a special interest in the three most influential women's organizations of the Cold War years: the International Council of Women, the International Alliance of Women and the Women's International Democratic Federation. Her most influential article, “Continuing Cold War Paradigms in Western Historiography of Transnational Women’s Organisations: The Case of the Women’s International Democratic Federation (WIDF),” was published in the Women’s History Review in 2010. In this connection, De Haan has also traced the development of interest in women's rights at the United Nations. Her articles and book chapters have appeared in Dutch, English, French, German, Spanish, and Turkish. In 2025, Francisca de Haan received a Suffrage Science Award.

== Selected works ==
- 2023: The Palgrave Handbook of Communist Women Activists around the World
- 2017: Rosa Manus (1881-1942): The International Life and Legacy of a Jewish Dutch Feminist. Co-edited with Myriam Everard
- 2013: Women's Activism: Global Perspectives from the 1890s to the Present
- 2010: “Continuing Cold War Paradigms in Western Historiography of Transnational Women’s Organisations: The Case of the Women’s International Democratic Federation (WIDF),” Women’s History Review 19, no. 4 (September 2010): 547–573
- 2006: A Biographical Dictionary of Women's Movements and Feminisms: Central, Eastern, and South Eastern Europe, 19th and 20th Centuries
- 1999: The Rise of Caring Power: Elizabeth Fry and Josephine Butler in Britain and the Netherlands. Co-authored with Annemieke van Drenth
- 1998: Gender and the Politics of Office Work: The Netherlands 1860-1940
