= Maria Bucur =

American-Romanian historian

Maria Bucur (born 2 September 1968 in Bucharest, Romania) is an American-Romanian historian of modern Eastern Europe and gender in the twentieth century. She has written on the history of eugenics in Eastern Europe, memory and war in twentieth-century Romania, gender and modernism, and gender and citizenship. She teaches history and gender studies at Indiana University Bloomington, where she holds the John W. Hill Professorship. Between 2011 and 2014 she served as founding Associate Dean of the School of Global and International Studies and helped inaugurate the first SGIS graduating class in 2014.

== Education and professional biography ==
After attending Georgetown University as an undergraduate in the School of Foreign Service (1987–91) and spending a year at the UCL School of Slavonic and East European Studies in London (1989–90), she obtained graduate degrees (MA and PhD) in history from the University of Illinois Urbana-Champaign (1996). There she worked under the guidance of Keith Hitchins and Sonya Michel. She has been working at Indiana University, Bloomington, since 1996, where she holds the John W. Hill Chair in East European History. Since 2016 she has also been a professor of Gender Studies.

At Indiana University she served as Chair of Gender Studies (2008–09), Director of the Russian and East European Institute (2006–07 and 2009–11), Co-Director of the European Union Center for Excellence (2006–07), and founding Associate Dean of the School of Global and International Studies (2011–14).

She has worked for several publications: Associate editor of The American Historical Review (2003–06), co-editor for the Aspasia Yearbook of Gender and Women's History (2005–12), board member for Gender & History, Journal of Women's History, Archiva Moldaviae, Cogent Arts and Humanities, and Integru.org.

She has served as President of the Association for Women in Slavic Studies (2009–11), as Coordinator of the Gender and Women's History Network for the European Social Science History Conference (2006–10), and as Chair of the Committee on Women Historians for the American Historical Association (2014–16).

In addition, she has served on the General Council as well as the History Committee of the National Council for Accreditation of University Titles, Diplomas, and Certificates, Ministry of Education and Research, Romania (2016–18).

== Research and publications ==
Bucur has published eight volumes, three of them as a single author, and the rest as co-author or editor. Her first monograph, Eugenics and Modernization in Interwar Romania (2002), examined the intellectual debates and policy-making activities of a group of doctors, lawyers, biologists, anthropologists, and politicians who used eugenicist ideas to propel Romanian society and institutions to a level of modernization in social engineering akin to attempts made in Germany and other West European states during the same period. Her second monograph, Heroes and Victims: Remembering War in Twentieth-Century Romania (2009), offered a close examination of various forms of remembering and commemorating the two world wars from 1918 onwards, with a focus on the tensions between grassroots and individual efforts (autobiographical writing, funerary monuments, commemorative plaques) and state-initiated commemorations (military cemeteries, official remembrance day commemorations, films). With a focus on the different meanings embodied in these various efforts, Bucur illuminates the important role played by such contestations in shaping the meaning of heroism, patriotism, and self-sacrifice along gender, regional, and ethno-religious lines. More recently, she has published Gendering Modernism: A Historical Reappraisal of the Canon (2017), which asks readers to reconsider the revolutionary aspects of modernism from the perspective gender norms.

In 2018, she published two books. The Century of Women: How Women Have Transformed the World Since 1900 was a bold overview of recent history from a feminist humanist perspective, placing women's historical empowerment at the heart of understanding recent changes in politics, economics, demography, culture, and knowledge making. Karen Offen, of Stanford University, called it a book that "should find a place on every intelligent person's reading list." With the political philosopher Mihaela Miroiu, Bucur published Birth of Democratic Citizenship: Women in Modern Romania in November 2018 with Indiana University Press. Her latest book is The Nation's Gratitude: War and Citizenship in Romania after World War I, published with Routledge in 2022.

In addition to these monographs and other co-edited volumes, she has published over seventy articles and chapters in a variety of outlets, including The American Historical Review, The Times Literary Supplement, Project Syndicate and Public Seminar. She has had dozens of media appearances and interviews in the press, from the History Channel to Al-Jazeera.

== Romanian studies ==
A passionate promoter of culture and history from her native country, Bucur has helped organize eleven conferences on Romanian Studies (2007–2017) at Indiana University. Together with her colleague Christina Zarifopol-Illias, she worked to establish the first Romanian Studies graduate fellowship in the United States at Indiana University. She has worked with various partners in Romania. At Babeș-Bolyai University in Cluj-Napoca, together with a team of scholars from Indiana University and the Central European University, she helped launch the Oral History Center in 1997. She has worked with colleagues at the National University of Political Studies and Public Administration in Bucharest on several research and publication projects, and also taught several graduate workshops. She has collaborated with Transylvania University in Brașov and the Aspera foundation on two oral history workshops. In addition to these academic events, she has worked with artists and musicians to promote visibility for Romanian culture.

== Awards and honors ==
Bucur is the recipient of numerous grants and fellowships, among them two National Endowment for the Humanities research grants, a research fellowship from the Woodrow Wilson Center in Washington, DC, and a fellowship from the American Association of University Women. In May 2018 she was awarded an Honorary Doctorate from the National University of Political Studies and Public Administration in Bucharest, Romania.

== Books ==
- The Nation's Gratitude: War and Citizenship in Romania after World War I. London: Routledge, 2022
- Birth of Democratic Citizenship: Women in Modern Romania, with Mihaela Miroiu. Bloomington: Indiana University Press, 2018.
- The Century of Women: How Women Have Transformed the World Since 1900. Lanham: Rowman & Littlefield, 2018.
- The Global West: Connections and Identities, with Frank Kindner, Ralph Mathisen, Sally McKee, and Theodore R. Weeks, 3rd rev. ed. Boston: Cengage, 2017.
- Gendering Modernism: A Historical Reappraisal of the Canon. London: Bloomsbury Academic, 2017.
- Making Europe.The Story of the West. Co-author with Frank Kidner, et al. 2nd rev. ed. Belmont, CA: Cengage, 2012.
- Heroes and Victims: Remembering War in Twentieth-Century Romania. Bloomington, IN: Indiana University Press, 2009.
- Gender and War in Twentieth Century Eastern Europe. Co-editor with Nancy M. Wingfield. Bloomington, IN: Indiana University Press, 2006.
- Eugenics and Modernization in Interwar Romania. Pittsburgh, PA: Pittsburgh University Press, 2002; translated into Romanian as Eugenie și modernizare în România interbelică (Iași: Polirom, 2005).
- Patriarhat și emancipare în istoria gîndirii politice românești. Co-editor with Mihaela Miroiu. Iași, Polirom, 2002.
- Staging the Past: The Politics of Commemoration in Habsburg Central Europe,1848 to the Present. Co-editor with Nancy Wingfield. La Fayette, IN: Purdue University Press, 2001.
