= Jai Chandiram =

Jai Chandiram (26 December 1937 – 11 May 2013) was a media person. She was the deputy director general of Doordarshan. She contributed to the use of media in education and was instrumental in introducing its use at premier institutes like Central Institute of Education – NCERT, Indira Gandhi Open University (IGNOU), and the Asia Pacific Institute for Broadcasting and Development (AIBD) in Kuala Lumpur, among other institutions.

== Early life ==
She earned a Teacher's Training Diploma, Lady Irwin College, New Delhi, 1957. She studied Drama and Radio at Briarcliff College, New York. She earned a Bachelor’s of Science in Broadcasting Television, School of Journalism and Communications at University of Florida, Gainesville in, 1961. Jai earned her master's degree from the School of Journalism and Communications, University of Florida, Gainesville, 1966.

== Career ==
Chandiram began her career as a producer in Doordarshan at age 24 in 1961, two years after the Television Division of the All India Radio was started. She was given charge of setting up India's school television broadcasts. She was one of the first TV professionals who had no radio background. Her main concerns were gender imbalance issues, children's education, and distance learning. She had no predecessors to learn from at Doordarshan. Doordarshan had a large audience base, and she looked at details, both big and small, to ensure that the programs were visually appealing and intellectually stimulating.

Later she would describe the extent of improvisation which was the norm: figuring out the exact 20-minute period when the light coming through the studio window was just right to go through the prism and demonstrate VIBGYOR, and supplementing studio lights for other programming with lights borrowed from her uncle’s car workshop."

In the mid 1970s, she worked for the Satellite Instructional Television Experiment in Ahmedabad (SITE), which took television to Indian village schools.

Chandiram was a part-time actress off-Broadway. Several of her admirers were impressed with her "grasp of issues and networking skills".

She was a jury member at NHK (Japan) and the IAWRT Awards.

=== Positions ===
She held individual contributor and executive roles, including:

- President of the International Association of Women in Radio and Television(IAWRT) and founder and Managing Trustee, IAWRT – India Chapter.
- Head of the television department at the Central Institute of Education of the National Council for Educational Research and Training(NCERT)
- Head of the department of television at the Film and Television Institute, Pune
- Head of the Fortune Institute of Information and Television (FICT)
- Advisor at the Delhi International Arts Festival
- Media consultant(Television) at the Asia Pacific Institute for Broadcasting and Development, (AIBD), Kuala Lumpur
- Head of the Educational Media Production Center of Indira Gandhi National Open University (EMPC-IGNOU)
- Executive director, Media, at the Indira Gandhi National Center for the Arts (IGNCA)
- Advisor to the Government of Andhra Pradesh for the cluster of channels focussing on education, named Mana TV
- Director of Doordarshan, Delhi
- Director of Doordarshan, Ahmedabad
- Director of Doordarshan, Central Production Centre
- Examiner for the Jamia Millia Institute for Mass Communication
- Commonwealth of Learning Consultant and trainer for National Institute of Teachers (NIT) and NOUN, Nigeria
- Worked with Ammu Joseph to study the training of Sri Lankan journalists, for UNESCO
- Consultant for the Princess Diana Leprosy Mission Trust
- Media Advisor, DEP-SSA IGNOU

== Recognition ==
- First Asian president of IAWRT
- Recipient of the IAWRT Lifetime Achievement Award
