= Wolter Broese van Groenou =

Dutch businessman

- Born: 2 January 1842; Apeldoorn, Netherlands
- Died: 27 October 1924 (aged 82); Den Haag, Netherlands
- Citizenship: Dutch
- Occupations: Soldier; Businessman
- Father: Mien van Wulfften Palthe, Dolf Broese van Groenou, Wolter Broese van Groenou

Wolter Broese van Groenou (2 January 1842 – 27 October 1924) was a Dutch businessman who was the owner of the Tandjong Tirto sugar plantation near Djokjakarta.

== Early and personal life ==
Wolter Broese van Groenou was born in Apeldoorn on 2 January 1842, as the son of Arend Joachims Broese van Groenou and Wilhelmina Stefania Albertina Jalink.

On 14 May 1874, the 32-year-old Broese van Groenou married Jeanetta Emilia Wieseman (1854–1931) at Yogyakarta, Dutch East Indies, and the couple had six children, including Mien van Wulfften Palthe, who went on to became a feminist and pacifist, Dolf Broese van Groenou, who participated in the architecture event in the art competition at the 1924 Summer Olympics, and Wolter Broese van Groenou, who together with Dolf played football for HVV Den Haag at the turn of the century, with both starting in the 1899 KNVB Cup final.

== Club career ==
Broese van Groenou attended the Royal Military Academy in Breda, after which he was sent to the Dutch East Indies, becoming a soldier in the Royal Dutch East Indies Army until 1878. While there, he married Jeanetta, whose father, Frederik (1830–1907), was a large planter in Yogyakarta, and he went on to take over his father-in-law's sugar plantation and sugar factory Tandjong Tirto, thus amassing a fortune. In 1891, the family moved back to the Netherlands, specifically Den Haag, from where Broese van Groenou continued to manage the sugar factory.

After initial hesitation, he agreed with her eldest daughter Mien to attend the Amsterdam Theatre School in 1898, where she graduated in 1900. In 1906 he bought a plot of land at Parkweg and asked his son, architect Dolf, to design a villa for the family, the so-called villa Hejmo Nia ("our home" in Esperanto), which was completed in 1908.

At the beginning of the 20th century, Broese van Groenou established an eighty-hectare estate near the Dutch town of Loenen on the Veluwe, where in 1925, a family mausoleum with columbarium was built.

== Death ==
Broese van Groenou died in Den Haag on 27 October 1924, at the age of 82.
