= Atria Institute on gender equality and women's history =

Atria Institute
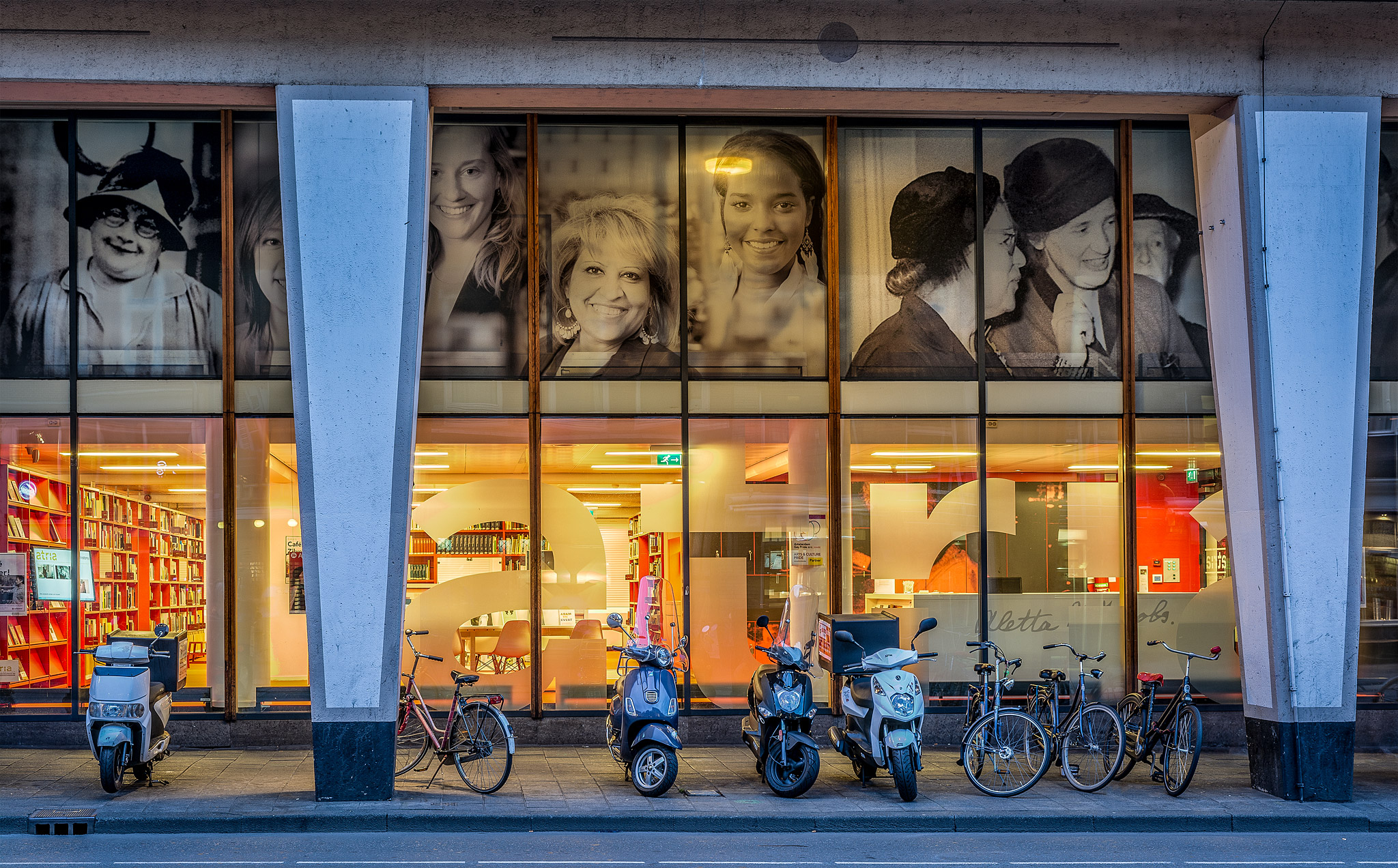
- Atria, view of the public library on the ground floor, Vijzelstraat 20, Amsterdam
- 52°21′57″N 4°53′35″E
- Location: Amsterdam, Netherlands
- Type: Public library
- Established: 1935

Other information
- Website: atria.nl

Atria, institute on gender equality and women's history is a public library and research institute in Amsterdam dedicated to research and policy advice on gender equality and to the documentation and archival of women's history. Its previous names were International Information Centre and Archive for the Women's Movement (IIAV) (1988-2009) and Aletta, Institute for Women's History (2009-2013).

== History ==
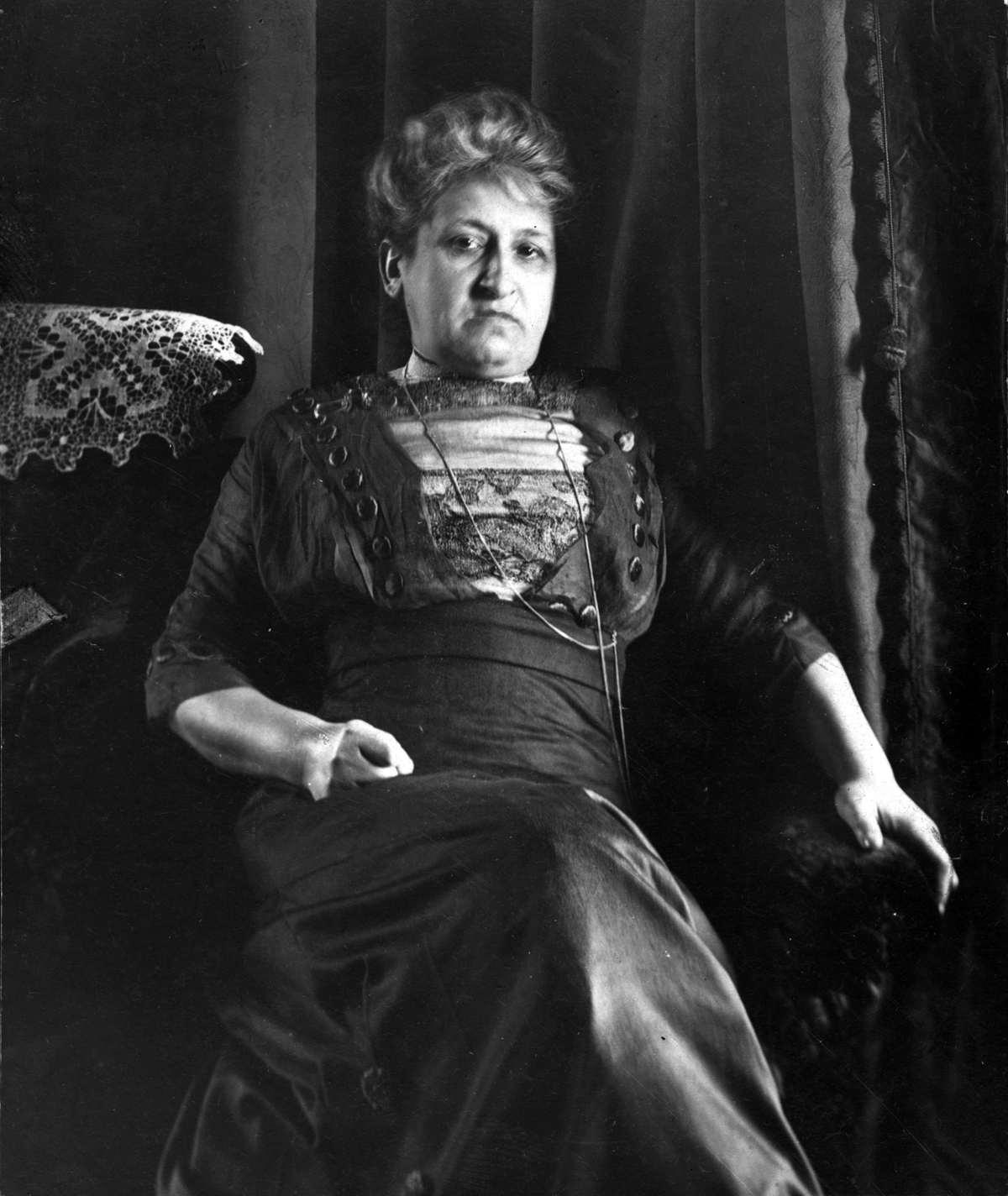
Aletta Jacobs

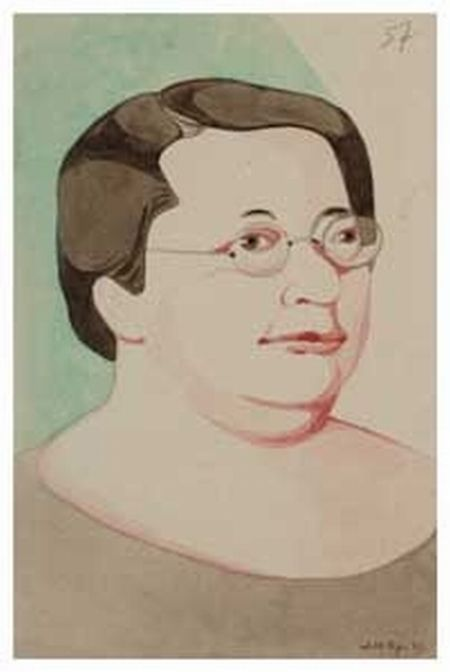
Rosa Manus by "J.H. Sp." (Koos Speenhoff). Rosa Manus (1881-1942) was a coworker of Aletta Jacobs and a feminist and pacifist activist.

=== Foundation ===
In 1988, the International Archives for the Women's Movement (Dutch: Internationaal Archief voor de Vrouwenbeweging (IAV)), the Documentation Centre for the Women's Movement (Dutch: Informatie en Documentatie Centrum (IDC)), and the journal Lover merged to form the International Information Centre and Archives for the Women's Movement (Dutch: Internationaal Informatiecentrum en Archief voor de Vrouwenbeweging (IIAV), with the goals of making information available for study and cooperation across the broad spectrum of women's activities, covering both historic and contemporary aspects of their lives. In ongoing efforts to collect materials, they set a goal to acquire at least one periodical from each country throughout the world.

At the end of 1993 the IIAV moved to the former Catholic church of Gerardus Majellakerk, built in 1924 in Byzantine Revival style, Obiplein in Amsterdam-Oost. On 11 August 2009, the organization was renamed the Aletta Institute for Women's History, in honor of Aletta Jacobs and two years later, moved back into Amsterdam, housing at Vijzelstraat 20. Aletta Institute merged with the E-Quality Information Centre for Gender, Family and Diversity Issues on 28 January 2013 to form the Atria Institute on Gender Equality and Women's History. Atria, the brightest star of the Southern Triangle, is always moving and has variable magnitude. The star's characteristics represent why it was chosen as a symbol of the organization, which focuses on "both the inequality and the variability of the relationship between men and women in society".

=== Background ===
IAV had been formed in 1935 by prominent feminists from three different eras of the Netherlands' women's movement: Rosa Manus, Johanna Naber and Willemijn Posthumus-van der Goot. The three women wanted their collected materials about the First wave of feminism, which included the personal papers of Aletta Jacobs, to be available for research and study. To that end, they negotiated with the International Institute of Social History (IISG) to allow them two rooms in the IISG building located at Keizersgracht 264 to establish a library. During World War II their archival materials were stolen by Nazi plundering and the library remained closed until 1947. Posthumus-van der Goot was the only founder who survived the war. She became president of the IAV and headed the effort to reclaim their stolen property. In 1947, a small number of boxes of materials were returned and then in 1966, Ivo Krikava, a librarian in Hradec Králové, Czechoslovakia found and returned four books with the IAV stamp in them. This collection, with later acquisitions, was accommodated in the 1950s within a building at Herengracht nr. 262–266. When the IAV obtained a substantial government grant during the International Women's Year 1975, the collection had grown beyond the capacity of the building.

IDC was founded in 1968, as the repository for documents of the Netherlands Women Council, and focused on collecting contemporary information on the Second feminist wave. In 1973, the Man Vrouw Maatschappij founded and began publishing the feminist cultural magazine Lover. These two organizations were sharing space with the Foundation of Women in the Visual Arts (Dutch: Stichting Vrouwen in de Beeldende Kunst (SVBK)) at Keizersgracht 10, when IAV moved into the space with them. After cohabitating for seven years, the three organizations merged in 1988.

== Archival policies ==
While the materials were to be widely shared, the organization had to establish policies and procedures to deal with preservation, privacy, legalities and other concerns. Some of the issues they addressed were that the creator of the archive, not the repository (the IIAV), determines what is included in the records they donate. The second premise was that the IIAV determined the scope of the collections that they wanted to acquire, thus they are limited to women and the various women's movements. Finally, the institute recognized that after its acquisition, the archivist had to be able to organize and preserve only those materials within the scope. From its earliest beginnings, the archive was intended to be an international archive repository, though the fact that the women's movements were confined at that time to Western countries and their colonial territories, shaped the character of the collected materials. After the war ended, there was a shift in focus to more national concerns and almost all donations, as there was no active acquisition effort, came from Dutch women with ties to the various women's groups.

In the first part of the 1970s, women's history groups at Dutch universities began utilizing the materials of the archive. Wanting better access to the materials, the first professional inventory was completed in 1980 and published in 1982. Acquisitions began in earnest for the first time since the 1930s in 1989. The focus was on documents created by ordinary women living their private lives, rather than on the public leaders of the organizations. Previous focus on leadership had left significant gaps in women's history and the birth of gender studies made documents such as personal diaries and letters gain importance. Over 700 document collections, made it imperative that the organization adopt professional preservation techniques and establish a separate archival department, which became the impetus for the 1988 merger. Policy established at the creation of IIAV set forth the new policy that their collection would focus primarily on women in the Dutch women's movement, in its diverse factions. Two exceptions were added: one for archives on international conferences and organizations, and another for archives created where records might be damaged because they could not be stored properly. Another important stipulation was that the records would be national in scope, thus records of local organizations or branches of national organizations are ineligible for inclusion. To coordinate which archival facilities might hold which collections, the organization maintains the Database Women's Archives (DAVA), as a reference.

In 1992, the institution modified their collection policies to specifically include acquisitions from black, migrant and refugee populations and by 1998 had made the records collected to date available to the public. Wies van Groningen was a member of the supervisory committee of the project “Information on Black, Migrant and Refugee Women” from 1992 to 1995. In 2005 another policy change created two divisions of the acquisitions area specifically focused on oral history and video records.

== Archival collections ==
Since the institute was not founded until 1988 and established their acquisition policy the following year, the bulk of the materials in the institution were collected in the 1980s or later. Just some of the organizational collections include, the records of the feminist organization Tegen Haar Wil (Against Her Will); the papers of a martial arts center, Kenau, where women learned self-defense; the archives of the oldest Dutch women's organization, Labor Ennobles (Dutch: Arbeid Adelt), documents of the Dutch Association of Business and Professional Women (Dutch: Nederlandsche Vereeniging van Werkende Vrouwen); the archival records of the International Federation of Business and Professional Women; the archival materials of the International Federation for Research in Women's History (IFRWH); the archives of the International Federation of University Women (IFUW); the records of the first Dutch Arab organization, the National Association of Single Arab Women (Dutch: Landelijke Vereniging van Alleenstaande Arabische Vrouwen); and the papers of Zami, a multi-ethnic women's organization, among others. In 1992, another portion of the looted archive of IAV was discovered and after eleven years of negotiations with Moscow's Osobyi Archive was returned to Amsterdam in 2003.

Among the individual archives which the institute holds are the personal papers of both Aletta Jacobs and Rosa Manus. In 1994, the documents of Johanna Naber, who had willed them to IAV, but changed her will after the Nazis looted the archives, were received by the institution from her family. The personal archives of Betsy Bakker-Nort and Mien van Wulfften Palthe are also part of the institutes' collections.

== Facility ==
The facility as of 2012, housed more than 100,000 books, 30,000 photographs and posters, and 6,000 periodicals of women's and feminist international publications, comprising nearly 1,500 linear meters of archival materials. The ground-floor reading room contains 500 shelves of books published since 2000 and current issues of some 175 periodicals and journals, comprising around 3,500 linear meters of materials.

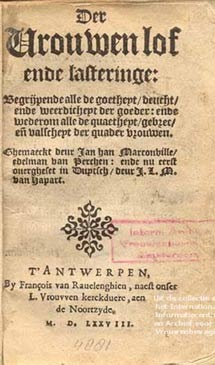
Jean de Marconville: Der vrouwen lof ende lasteringe, 1578, an early Dutch translation of De la bonté et mauvaistié des femmes, 1563. The oldest book in the Atria library collection.

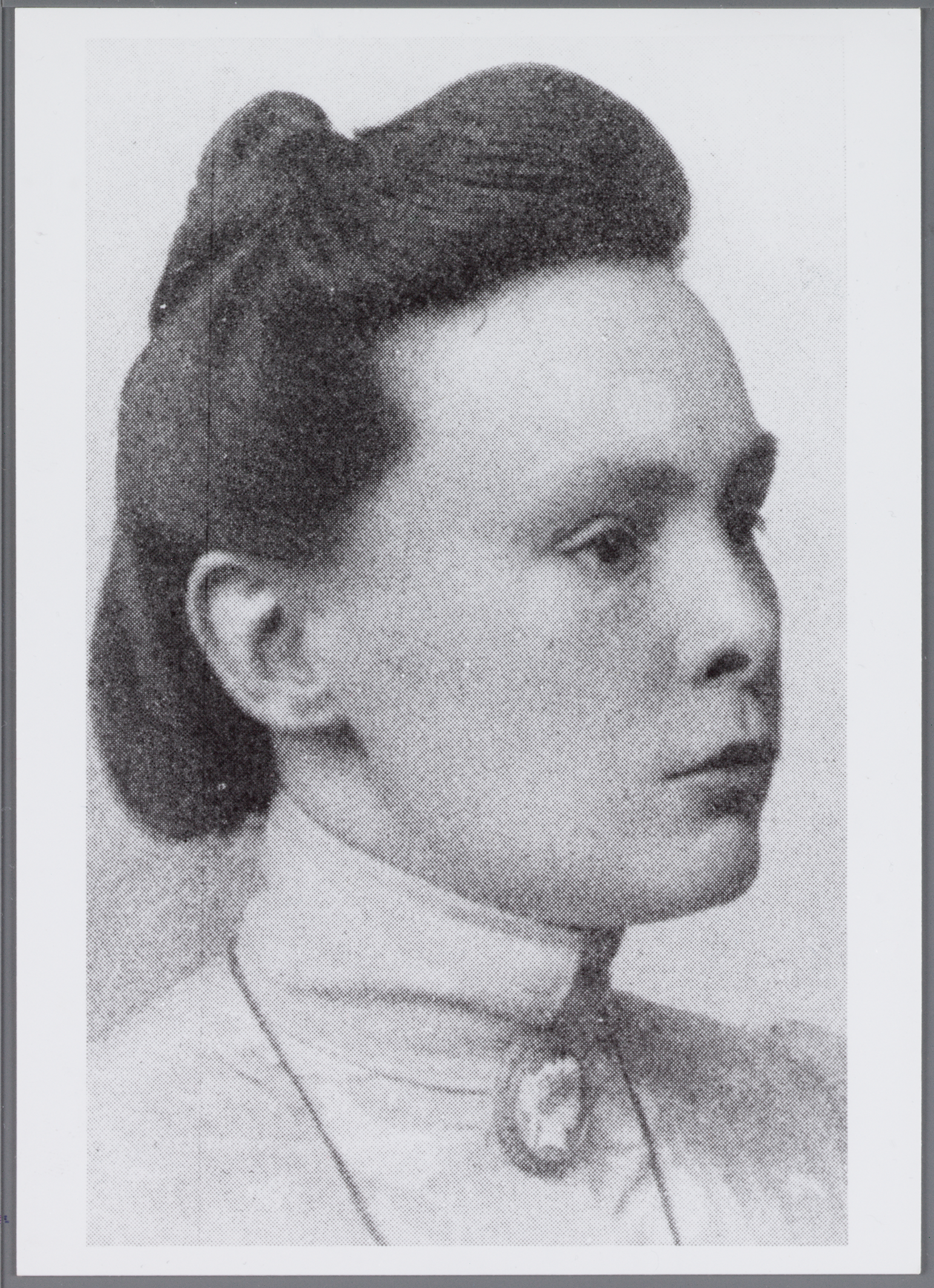
Johanna Naber (1859-1941) around 1898, Dutch feminist and cofounder

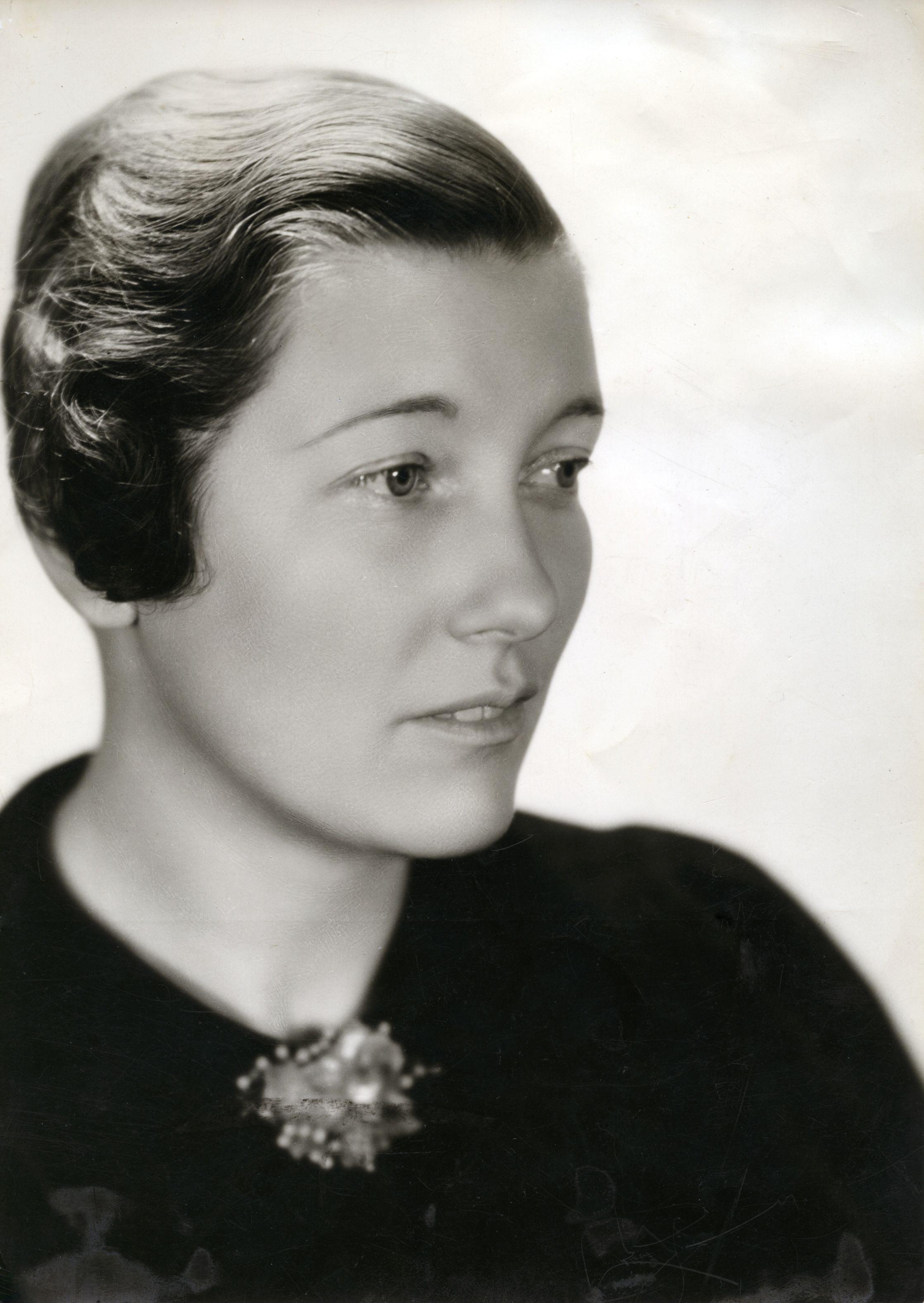
Willemijn Posthumus-van der Goot (1897–1989), Dutch feminist and cofounder

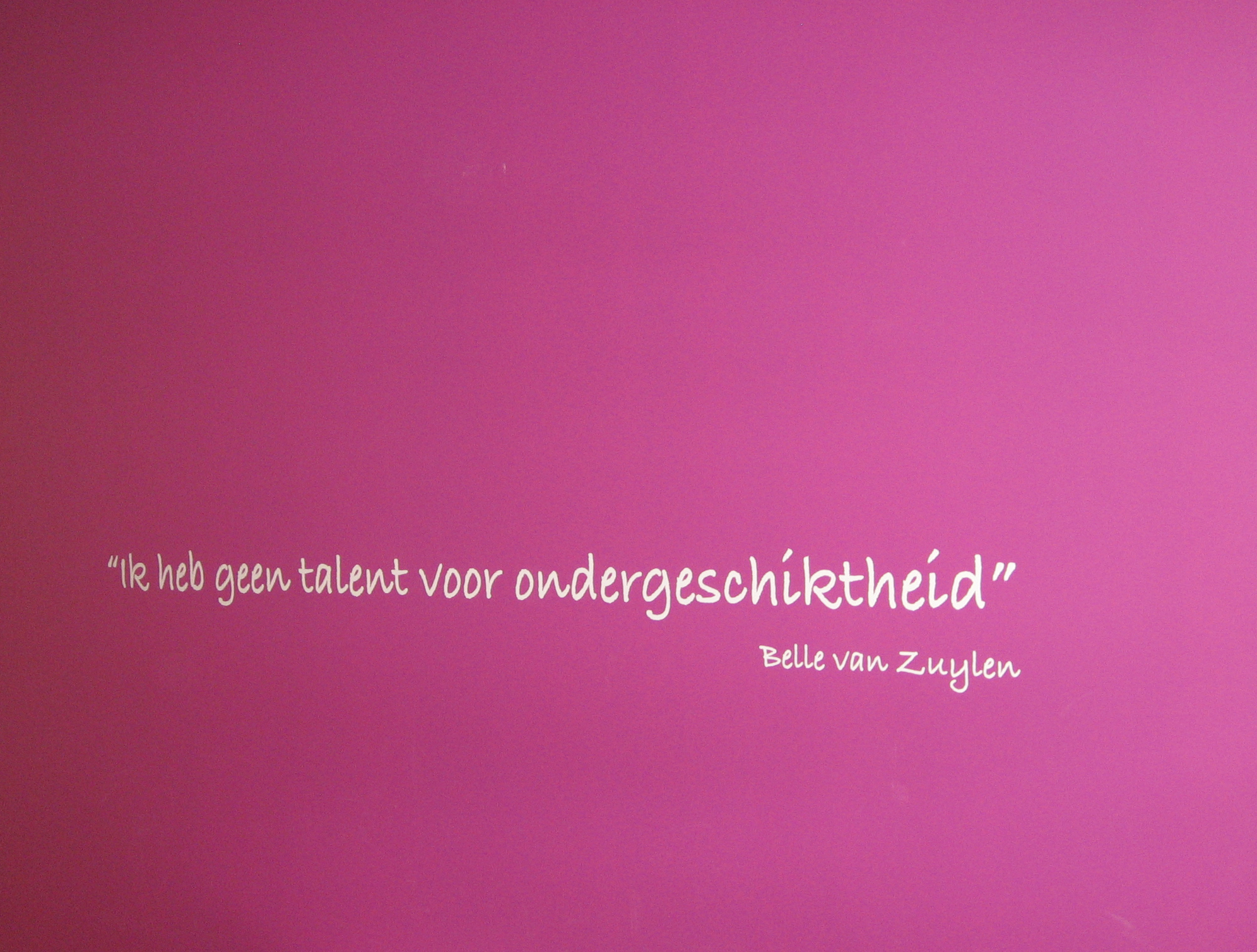
Quote of Belle van Zuylen on a wall at the office of Atria. "I lack talent for subservience", translation of Je n'ai pas les talents subalternes (letter to James Boswell).

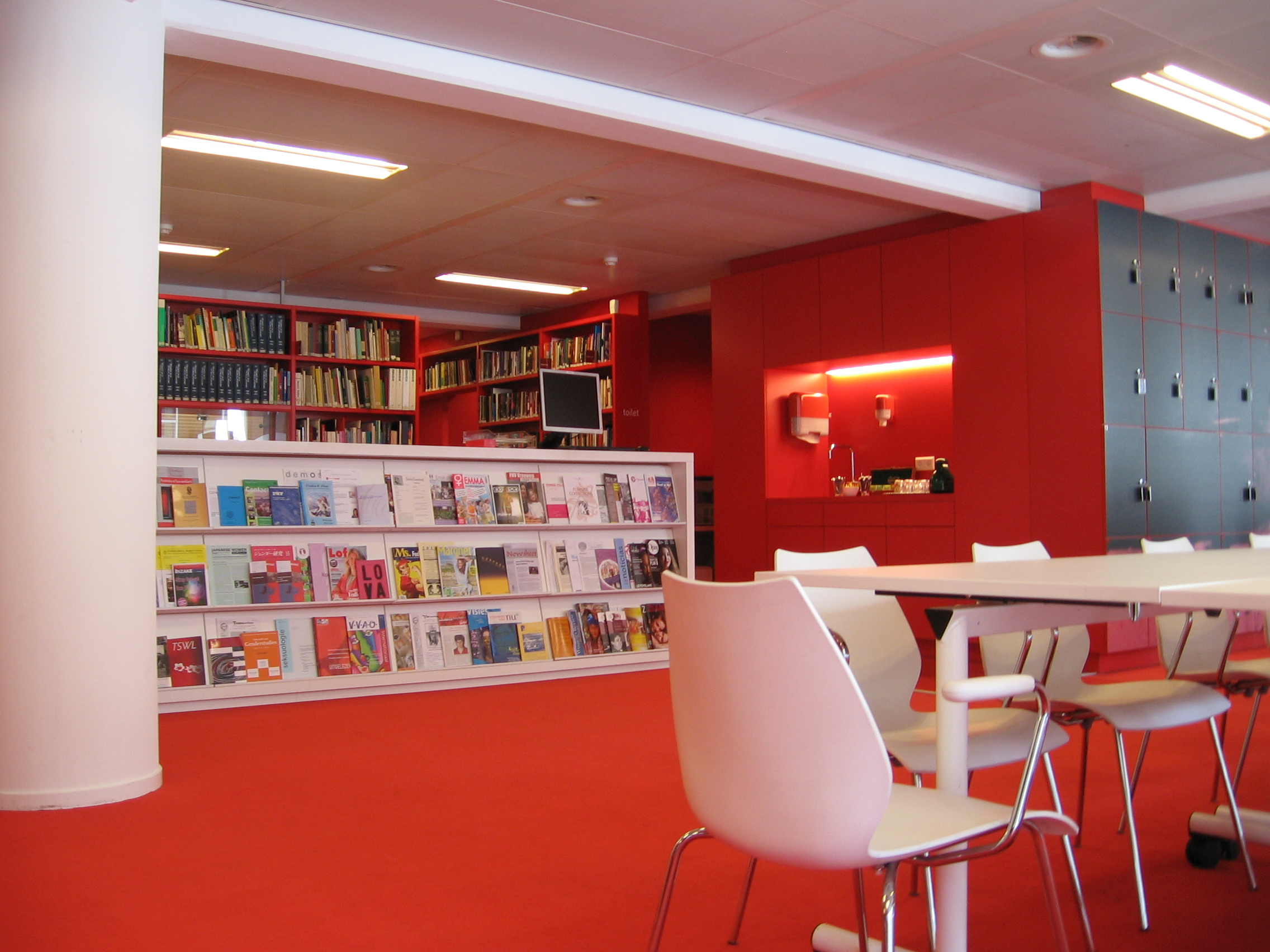
Atria library

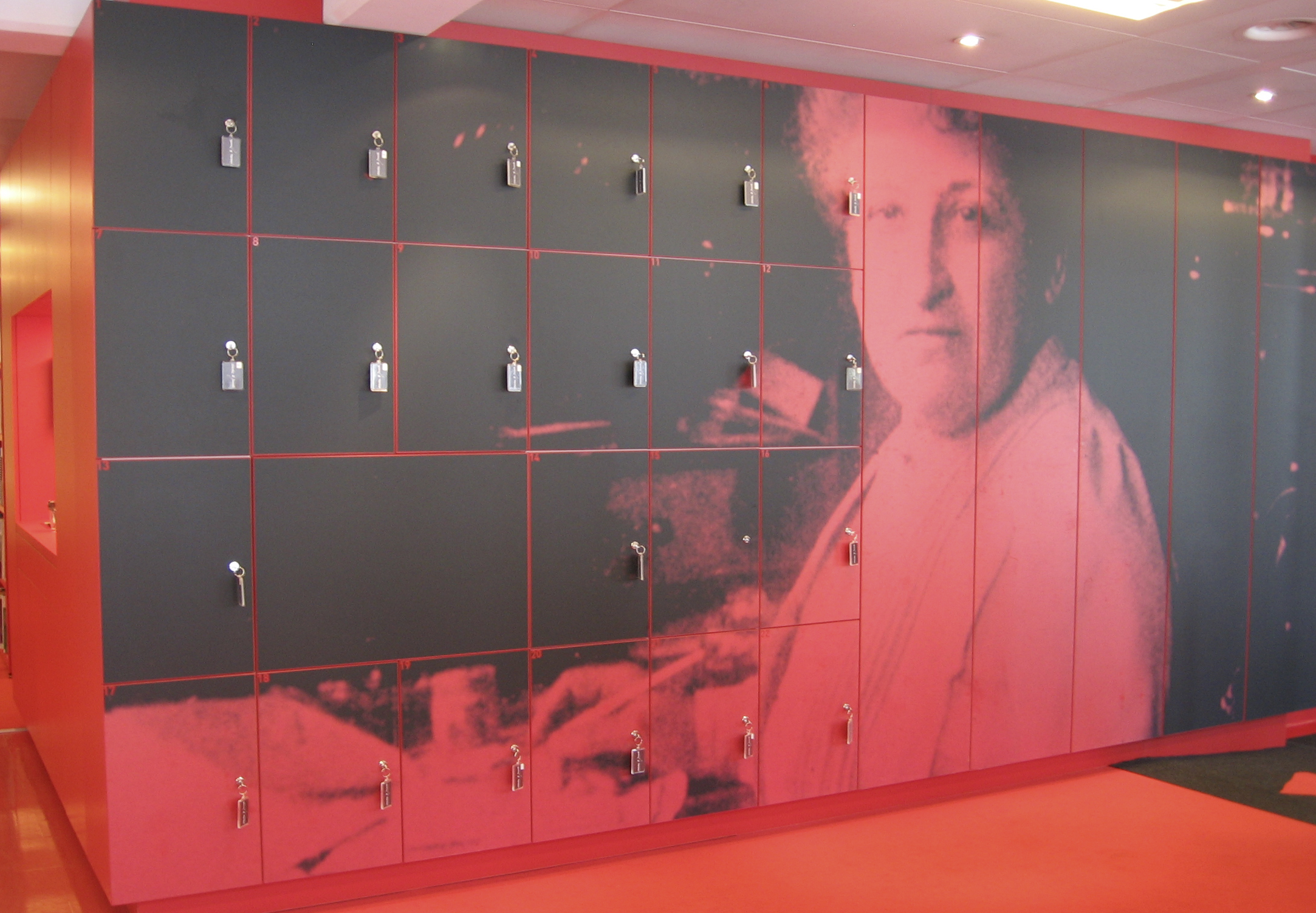
Atria library. Lockers with a portrait of Aletta Jacobs
