= Willemijn Posthumus-van der Goot =

Dutch economist, feminist and radio broadcaster (1897–1989)

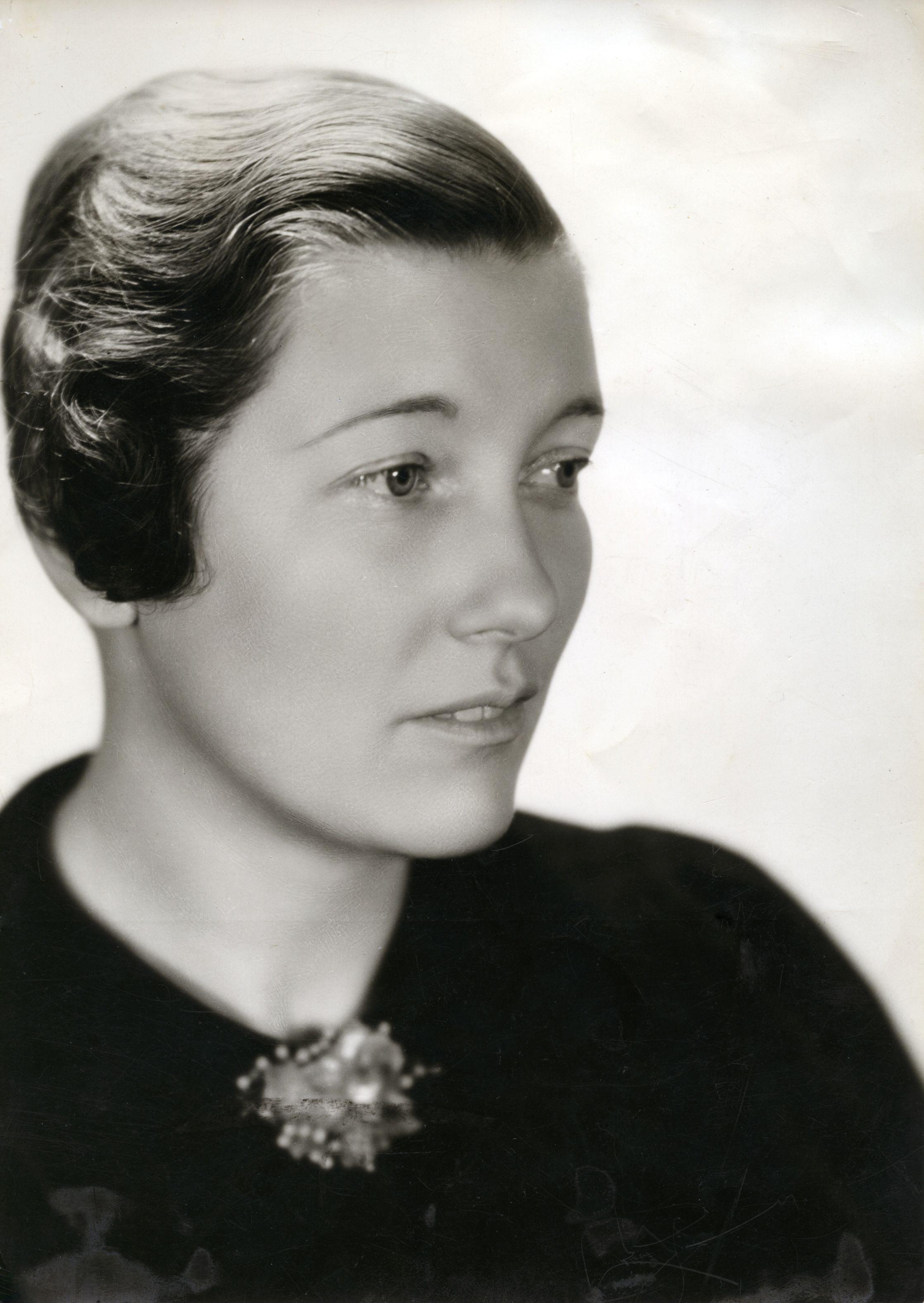
- Born: Willemijn Hendrika van der Goot; 2 May 1897; Pretoria, South Africa
- Died: 16 January 1989 (aged 91); Amsterdam, Netherlands
- Other names: Lilian van der Goot, Willemien Hendrika van der Goot, Willy van der Goot, Peggy Vlug (pen-name)
- Occupations: economist, feminist, peace activist, radio broadcaster
- Years active: 1933–1977

Willemijn Posthumus-van der Goot (2 May 1897 – 16 January 1989) was a Dutch economist, feminist and radio broadcaster. As the first woman to attain a doctorate in economics in the Netherlands, her work focused on the impact of working women on the economy. Recognizing that there were few sources, she joined with other feminists to create the International Archives for the Women's Movement in 1935. Writing reports on women's work, she refuted government claims that women working outside the home was of no benefit. First proposed in 1939, the Household Council, which she saw as an organization to foster training and organize domestic laborers was instituted in 1950. She founded the International Association of Women in Radio, as an organization for professional development and networking in 1949. As a peace activist, she was involved in the promotion of pacifism and believing women had unique qualities for solving world problems, she established the International Scientific Institute for Feminine Interpretation. In 1982, in recognition of her significant contributions to the Dutch Women's Movement, Posthumus-van der Goot was appointed as an officer in the Order of Orange-Nassau. In 2008, she, her husband and sister, were honored as Righteous Among the Nations by the government of Israel, for their fostering children during the Dutch occupation by the Nazis.

== Early life ==
Willemijn Hendrika van der Goot was born on 2 May 1897 in Pretoria, South Africa to Elisabeth Marijna (née Castens) and Fiepko van der Goot. Her father was an engineer and Lilian, as she was called, grew up with her sister, Annie, in the Dutch colony of Batavia, Dutch East Indies. She attended Gymnasium Koning Willem III obtaining a certificate to teach French in 1914. Moving to Switzerland, Van der Goot originally began her higher education studies in engineering in Lausanne, but when she decided to study economics instead, she transferred to the new school Nederlandsche Handels-Hoogeschool (Netherlands School of Commerce) in Rotterdam in 1920. During her studies, she joined the Rotterdam Female Students' Association and completing her studies in 1926. She went on to complete her dissertation, De besteding van het inkomen. Het indexcijfer van de kosten van levensonderhoud (The expenditure of income. The index of the cost of living) in 1930, graduating as the first woman to earn a PhD in economics in the Netherlands.

== Career ==
Soon after completing her studies, on 19 January 1931 in London, Van der Goot married Nicolaas Wilhelmus Posthumus, a professor of economic history whom she had met during her schooling. Unable to find employment, particularly due to the government restriction on married women working during the Great Depression, she began to help her husband with his work. Starting in 1933, she prepared statistical information for his study of the History of the Leidse Sheet Metal Industry and his work on the History of Dutch Pricing. She also became more active as a feminist, attending a 1934 conference on Women's Rights and Equal Citizenship hosted by the Vereeniging voor Vrouwenkiesrecht. Recognizing at the conference how little was known regarding women's economic contributions, Posthumus-van der Goot helped organize a conference the following year held in Bilthoven which resulted in the creation of the Jongeren Werk Comité (JWC) (Youth Work Committee), of which she would soon become president. That same year, she began an economic analysis for the Committee on Maintaining Women's Freedom for Labor to evaluate the impact of working women. Her research confirmed that in families where women worked outside the home functioned more efficiently than those where women worked solely as a housewife.

In trying to prepare the report, Posthumus-van der Goot recognized that there were no archival records which could be consulted that dealt solely with women's history. She joined Rosa Manus, a prominent feminist, and Johanna Naber, a historian interested in documenting women's history, in 1935 to found the International Archives for the Women's Movement (Dutch: Internationaal Archief voor de Vrouwenbeweging (IAV)) for the purpose of promoting scholarship on women's history and contributions to society. In 1936, she began working at Algemene Vereniging Radio Omroep (AVRO) as the head of radio programming for women. She launched a popular five-minute program Een kort gesprek van vrouw tot vrouw (A short chat from women to women) that aired from 1936 to 1952, except during the Nazi occupation of the Netherlands. That same year, she also became involved in pacifism and attended the Universal Gathering of Peace (French: Rassemblement universel pour la paix), held in Brussels. In 1937, when Minister Carl Romme proposed barring all married women from paid work, Posthumus-van der Goot not only published articles against Romme's preliminary draft law, but assisted in organizing a postcard campaign to flood the Ministry of Social Affairs with protests.

In 1938, Posthumus-van der Goot's daughter, Claire was born and the couple, who had previously lived in Amsterdam, moved to Noordwijk aan Zee, where they took up lodging with Lilian's sister Annie Diaz-van der Goot and her child, Liesbeth.

== Second World War ==
When German soldiers were billeted in their home, the household moved to Leiden and began to work with the Dutch resistance to smuggle children out of Amsterdam and place them with foster families. She began to work on plans in 1939 to develop a Household Council, to organize domestic laborers and provide training for them. In 1940, the majority of the IAV collections were confiscated by Nazi looters and Rosa Manus was arrested, deported to a concentration camp and murdered. The following year, Johanna Naber also died, leaving Posthumus-van der Goot as the sole living founder of the IAV and in charge of recovery attempts. In 1943, ten-year-old Bertha Eveline Koster, known as "Bep", moved in with the extended family and stayed with them for the next two years. That same year, Posthumus-van der Goot began working with Jane de Iongh and Marga Klompé on reorganizing the IAV for the post-war period.

== Postwar career ==
When the war ended, Posthumus-van der Goot and her family returned to Amsterdam, where she resumed her broadcasts at AVRO. In 1946, she published Statistiek en werkelijkheid (Statistics and Reality), which evaluated how statistics could be manipulated to present different realities. Two years later, Van moeder op dochter, Het aandeel van de vrouw in een veranderende wereld (From Mother to Daughter, The Proportion of Women in a Changing World) was published, which she edited and co-wrote, along with Anna de Waal. The book, written for the changeover of power from Queen Wilhelmina to Queen Juliana, was a comprehensive overview of the Dutch Women's Movement and is still regarded as an important text, having gone into several subsequent reprintings and editions. In 1949, in an effort to increase networking and help women broadcaster's in their career development, Posthumus-van der Goot founded the International Association of Women in Radio (IAWR) (Television broadcasters were incorporated into the organization in 1959). She strongly believed that International networks of women would facilitate and foster world peace. In 1950, she and her husband separated and lived apart until his death in 1960.

Finally in 1950, the organization Posthumus-van der Goot had first envisioned in 1939 as the Household Council was developed. She also founded a women's advisory office, named after her radio show From Women to Women which operated under the auspices of the Marie Jungius Foundation in 1951. The office gave assistance to women in a wide-ranging platform focusing on topics from household chores to make-up and published a newsletter, with tips and advice until 1964. In 1952, she stepped down from her broadcasting post with AVRO but continued to serve as president of the IAWR until 1956. Posthumus-van der Goot published Vrouwen vochten voor de vrede (Women Fought for Peace) in 1961 and Vrede met een menselijk gezicht (Peace with a Human Face) in 1973. Both looked at the role of ordinary people in advocating for peace, though her views that women were particularly suited in their role as mothers as having special negotiating talents was not fashionable with second-wave feminists. She served as chair in 1964, of the Dutch women's committee to prepare for the Year International Cooperation recognized by the United Nations in 1965. In 1967, Pothumus-van der Goot founded the International Scientific Institute for Feminine Interpretation (ISIFI), as part of the International Peace Research Association, to advance study on how women contributed to the development of peace and other world problems.

In 1974, Posthumus-van der Goot stepped down from the IAV leadership, though she continued to work at the archive as a librarian. She worked on a second edition of From mother to daughter in 1977. In 1982, her significant contributions to the Dutch Women's Movement were recognized when she was honored as an officer of the Order of Orange-Nassau.

== Death and legacy ==
Posthumus-van der Goot died in Amsterdam on 16 January 1989, with hundreds of feminists attending her cremation on 20 January. Her work with the IAV and her book From Mother to Daughter are recognized as significant contributions to women's history in the Netherlands. In 2008, she was honored by the government of Israel as one of the Righteous Among the Nations for her assistance to Jews during the Holocaust.

== See also ==
- List of peace activists
