= Dutch Women's Council =

Organization to unite women's groups across the Netherlands

Dutch Women's Council (Dutch: Nederlandse Vrouwen Raad (NVR)) was founded in 1898 as an umbrella organization to unite women's groups across the country in their struggles for economic, legal, political, and social rights. Initially their focus was not political, but expanded to encompass women's suffrage. After more than one hundred years of operation, the council continues to strive for women's equality.

== History ==
Soon after the National Exhibition of Women's Labor Nationale Tentoonstelling van Vrouwenarbeid 1898|(nl) was held, the board members of the exhibition decided that an umbrella organization called the National Women's Council of the Netherlands (Dutch: Nationale Vrouwenraad van Nederland) would be beneficial for uniting women in the improvement of their legal, political and socio-economic status in the country. On 29 October 1898 the organization was founded with the first chairman designated as Mariane van Hogendorp and was affiliated with the International Council of Women.

The NVR membership was neither tied to political ideology or religious affiliation, which meant that debate on various points of view were welcomed, but also at times made members uncomfortable as their particular customs or practices had to be set aside for the advancement of the whole group. The council had a requirement that all affiliated associations, companies, or organizations have at least one woman who was a member of their governing board. To ensure that no single organization could dominate the other members, the bylaws specified that all decisions had to be unanimous. It was also hoped that such a rule would cause the women to discuss and eliminate issues which were divisive.

Among the issues the Council focused upon initially were equal education for girls and boys, the inclusion of women in employment opportunities, health and sanitation legislation, illegitimacy, loss of women's autonomy upon marriage, prostitution, alcoholism, and other social ills. Initially, women's suffrage was not an area in which the women focused; however, increasing involvement of several members like Aletta Jacobs with international suffragists like Elizabeth Cady Stanton and Susan B. Anthony, led the NVT to begin pressing for political rights.

== Modern organization ==
In 1972 the National Women's Council was reorganized to become the Dutch Women's Council and throughout the 1980s a corporate structure was adopted changing focus to a more economic focus. By the end of the 1980s, the organization faced a crisis because the Ministry of Welfare, Public Health and Culture saw no need to channel funds into an umbrella organization with such broad reach. That decision in turn, led to a split in the organization in 1992, with one branch retaining the name Dutch Women's Council and the other new organization, Arachne Women's Advice Bureau for Government Policy, being developed to evaluate women's policy issues. Social Participation and Rights of Women remain the goals of the organization, which has approximately 50 affiliated organizations. The organization's archival materials are located at the Atria Institute on gender equality and women's history.
