= Dolf Broese van Groenou =

Dutch architect

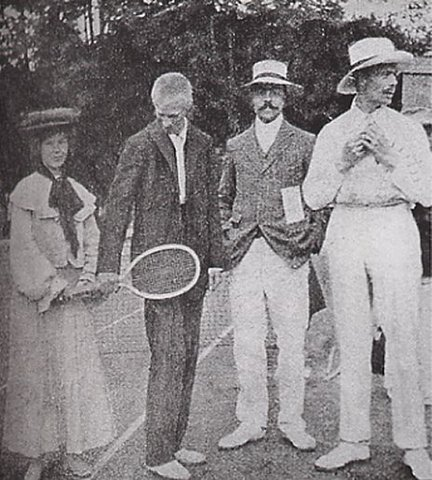
- Groenou, on the right, in 1904
- Born: 4 January 1880; Yogyakarta, Dutch East Indies
- Died: 19 May 1961 (aged 81); Wassenaar, Netherlands
- Occupation: Architect

Dolf Broese van Groenou (4 January 1880 – 19 May 1961) was a Dutch architect. His work was part of the architecture event in the art competition at the 1924 Summer Olympics.

Born in 1880 in the Dutch East Indies, Broese van Groenou was the son of Wolter Broese van Groenou, a wealthy sugar plantation owner. He attended Delft University, graduating in 1904 in construction engineering, and afterwards became an architect. He designed a villa where he lived the rest of his life and designed many villas in Loenen and The Hague. He designed plans for a sports stadium with Samuel de Clercq which was submitted in the art competition at the 1924 Summer Olympics, although the stadium ultimately was not built with the opposition of the mayor of The Hague. Broese van Groenou was also active in sport, being one of the first Dutch tennis competitors at the Wimbledon Championships in 1903. He played football for the club HVV Den Haag. In 1904, he competed for the Netherlands in cricket, and he later served as the president of the Dutch Tennis Association over a 16-year period, as well as a member of the Olympic Games Organizing Committee and a hockey referee. He died in 1961.
