= Adrian Miroiu =

Romanian political philosopher (born 1954)

Adrian Miroiu (born 20 August 1954) is a Romanian political philosopher.

He was dean of the Faculty of Philosophy at the University of Bucharest from 1993 to 1995, dean of the Faculty of Political Science at the National School of Political Science and Public Administration (SNSPA) from 2001 to 2005 and president of the National School of Political Science and Public Administration between 2008 and 2012. In 1999 and 2000 he was first deputy minister in the Romanian Ministry of Education.

He is the editor of the series Profiluri filosofice.

In 2021, he was elected a corresponding member of the Romanian Academy.

== Bibliography ==
=== Books ===
- Miroiu, Adrian. Fundamentele politicii. Iasi: Polirom, 2006.
- Socor, Vladimir, and Adrian Miroiu. September 11 and the Geopolitical Revolution of Our Time. București, Romania: Politeia-SNSPA, 2004.
- Miroiu, Adrian. Instituții în tranziție. București, România: Editura Punct, 2002.
- Miroiu, Adrian, Mireille Rădoi, and Marian Zulean. Politici publice. București: Politeia-SNSPA, 2002.
- Taylor, John, and Adrian Miroiu. Policy-Making, Strategic Planning, and Management of Higher Education. Bucharest: CEPES, 2002.
- Miroiu, Adrian. Argumentul ontologic: o cercetare logico-filosofică. București: ALL, 2001.
- Bulai, Alfred, and Adrian Miroiu. The Policy of Higher Education Funding in Romania București: Paideia, 2000.
- Miroiu, Adrian. Politici de asigurare a calităţii în învăţământul superior din România. București: Educaţia 2000, 2008.
- Miroiu, Adrian, and Andrei Marga. Învăt̨ământul românesc azi: studiu de diagnoză. Ias̨i: Polirom, 1998.
- Miroiu, Adrian. Ce nu e existența. București: Casa de Editură și Presă Șansa S.R.L., 1994.
- Miroiu, Adrian. Realitate și practică socială: studiu de ontologie formală. București: Editura Politică, 1989.

=== Selected articles ===
- Miroiu, Adrian. 2005. "Modality and World-Indexed Sentences". Logique Et Analyse. 48, no. 189: 209
- Miroiu, Adrian. 2004. "Characterizing Majority Rule: from Profiles to Societies". Economics Letters. 85, no. 3: 359.
- Coman, Mihai. 2004. "Media Bourgeoisie and Media Proletariat in Post-Communist Romania". Journalism Studies. 5, no. 1: 45–58.
- Miroiu, Adrian. 1999. "Actuality and World-Indexed Sentences". Studia Logica. 63, no. 3: 311–330.
