= International Federation for Research in Women's History =

International research organization

The International Federation for Research in Women's History (IFRWH) is an international organisation whose aim is "to encourage and coordinate research in all aspects of women's history at international level...". It was founded in 1987. It is also known as the Fédération Internationale Pour la Recherche en Histoire des Femmes (FIRHF) and the International Federation for Promotion of Research into Women's and Gender History.

It organises or jointly organises international conferences: that in 2018 is to be held at Simon Fraser University in Vancouver, Canada, on the theme "Transnationalisms, Transgressions, Translations". The 2000 conference was held in Oslo with the theme "Conflict and Co-Operation in Sites of Cultural Co-Existence: Perspectives from Women's History".

Membership is mainly through national committees of researchers, such as the UK Women's History Network. or the Bangladesh National Committee.

The Federation is an Affiliated International Organisation of the International Committee of Historical Sciences.

The Federation was founded in 1987 and held its initial conference in 1989 at the Rockefeller Foundation's Bellagio Center. Many of the papers presented there were published as Writing Women's History (1991, Springer: ISBN 9781349215126). The inaugural president was Ida Blom, who is as of June 2017 an honorary board member.
