= Irma Szirmai =

Hungarian pacifist and women's rights activist

- Szirmai by Olga Máté, 1913
- Born: Irma Reinitz; 24 December 1867; Budapest, Kingdom of Hungary
- Died: 6 May 1958 (aged 90); Budapest, Hungarian People's Republic
- Other names: Irma de Szirmai, Irma Szirmay, Irma Szirmay de Nagysáros, Szirmai Oszkárné
- Occupation: Activist

Irma Szirmai (24 December 1867 – 6 May 1958) was a Hungarian pacifist and women's rights activist. One of the founding members of the Feministák Egyesülete (Feminist Association), she led its Mother and Child Protection Committee from 1907. She served on the press committee from 1906 to 1913 and was the chair of the interpreters organized to facilitate the Seventh Conference of the International Woman Suffrage Alliance (IWSA), held in Budapest in 1913. She also worked as a deputy for the Board of Wards of the state and visited the orphanage and maternity hospital to assist patients and help them with needed services. A committed pacifist, she joined the Women's International League for Peace and Freedom (WILPF) when the organization was formed in 1915. In addition to her work in Hungary, Szirmai attended numerous international congresses of the IWSA and WILPF and served on international committees dealing with women's nationality and unmarried mothers. From 1925, she co-chaired the Feministák Egyesülete but resigned in 1927 when her daughter died. She returned to co-chair the organization in the 1930s. The organization was banned during World War II but was revived by Szirmai in 1946. It was forced by the government to dissolve again in 1949, but continued to operate clandestinely with Szirmai at the helm until her death in 1958.

== Early life and education ==
Irma Reinitz was born on 24 December 1867 in Budapest, Kingdom of Hungary, to Pauline (née Prager) and Dr. József Reinitz. Her family was Jewish. She married Oszkár Szirmai (1858–1943), director of the oil refinery at Fiume. They had two sons, József (1891–1971) and Olivér Szirmai (1899–1972), and a daughter Julia (died 1927).

== Activism ==
The Feministák Egyesülete (Feminist Association) was created in 1904 as an affiliate of the International Council of Women (ICW). Szirmai joined the organization shortly after its founding, and in 1907 became chair of the Mother and Child Protection Committee. Until the advent of the twentieth century, as there was no official organization running orphanages or providing for foundlings in the country, care was provided by private associations. The first child protection legislation was passed in Hungary in 1901, stipulating that the state must care for minor children. In 1903, the first manager of the Állami Gyermekmenhely (State Children Asylum) was appointed and a government-led orphanage was founded in Budapest. Construction started in 1905 and the facility opened in 1906. Szirmai worked as a deputy for the Board of Wards of the state and visited the orphanage and maternity hospital regularly. Her work on the Mother and Child Protection Committee dovetailed with her board work, as the committee kept detailed records on the patients they visited. In addition to counseling new mothers and training nurses, the committee offered services such as legal counseling, job placement, day care stipends, foster care placement, and short-term housing for displaced women.

Initially the Feministák Egyesülete were not interested in women's suffrage. At both the 1907 and 1908 annual meetings creating a suffrage committee was rejected. Rosika Schwimmer presented a lecture on the need for women to vote, and a suffrage committee aligned with the International Woman Suffrage Alliance (IWSA) was approved at the 1909 general meeting. Szirmai and Mrs. Alexander Szegvary both served to prepare reports for the suffrage committee. Szirmai also served on the press committee from 1906 to 1913. The Seventh Conference of the International Woman Suffrage Alliance was held in Budapest in 1913. Szirmai served as one of the members of the executive committee which organized the congress and was the chair of the interpreters. She sent a letter of support to the inaugural congress of the Women at the Hague in 1915, explaining that her work with the maternity homes was too demanding for her to attend. The Hungarian delegates who did attend listed her among the founding members of the Hungarian pacifist committee which became affiliated with the Women's International League for Peace and Freedom (WILPF).

Szirmai attended numerous international women's congresses as an official delegate, including the 1921 WILPF meeting in Vienna, the 1923 IWSA gathering in Rome, and the 1926 WILPF congress of Dublin. From 1925 until 1927, Szirmai was co-chair of the Feministák Egyesülete with Vilma Glücklich. Glücklich died in 1927 and that year, Szirmai's daughter died and she took leave of the chair. Thereafter, Eugénia Meller headed the organization, but in the 1930s shared the chair with Szirmai.

In 1929, Szirmai worked on two committees for the IWSA – the Committee on the Nationality of Married Women and the Committee for the Unmarried Mother and Her Child. Both of these were important feminist issues for Szirmai. She stated that "emancipációja elválaszthatatlan az anyák életminőségének kérdésétől, így a gyermekek jólététtől" ("the emancipation of women [was] inseparable from the issue of the quality of life of mothers, thus the well-being of children). As early as 1905, the ICW demanded that women's nationality be addressed, because internationally individual nations required that upon marriage, a wife lost her own nationality and gained her husband's. By the end of World War I, the three major international women's organizations – ICW, IWSA, and WILPF – led their affiliated organizations to treat women's individual nationality as a human rights issue. Similarly, in the twentieth century the issues facing single mothers changed from moral problems to rights-based challenges such as how to get men to provide for their children, how women could control their reproduction, how mothers could obtain equal access to education and employment, and how laws governing marriage and divorce could help women. Szirmai advocated for women to be fully independent with full rights to enable them to develop as individuals capable of supporting themselves and their children.

In 1941, the government began efforts to ban the Feministák Egyesülete because of its pacifist stance and leadership, which violated Anti-Jewish laws. Their organization license was revoked in 1942. Although it operated illegally for some years, Meller was eventually arrested by the Gestapo and murdered in 1944. It revived in 1946 at the conclusion of the war with Szirmai serving as its chair. Unable to attend the 1949 WILPF meeting in Copenhagen, Szirmai sent a personal message to the congress. That year, Mátyás Rákosi's government issued an order for the Feministák Egyesülete to dissolve. Despite the forced closing, Szirmai maintained her international feminist contacts, receiving their publications and encouraging their participation in peacefully solving the humanitarian crises and purges that resulted from the founding of the Hungarian People's Republic. The organization continued to operate clandestinely under Szirmai's leadership until her death.

== Death and legacy ==
Szirmai died in a street car accident on 6 May 1958, in Budapest. At her death, it was noted that she was the last of the founding members of the Feministák Egyesülete to die. Szirmai is remembered for her activism in child protection, education, and social work and as one of the most prominent women leaders of the Feministák Egyesülete.
