= Paula Pogány =

Hungarian women's rights activist (1884–1982)

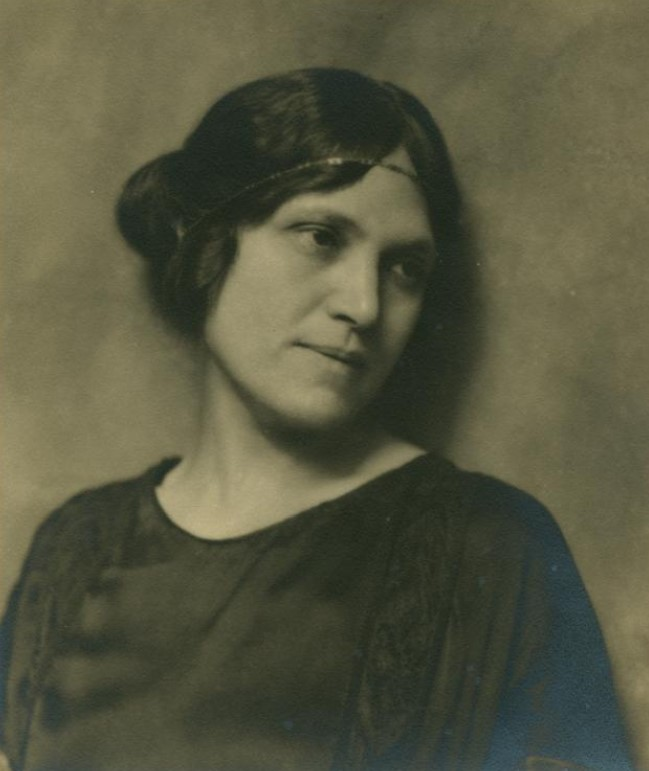
- Pogány, 1923
- Born: Paulina Júlia Feichtmann; 30 September 1884; Szeged, Austria-Hungary
- Died: 3 August 1982 (aged 97); Connecticut, US
- Other name: Paula Pogany Bennett
- Occupations: Activist, fitness instructor, cookbook author
- Years active: 1904–1950s

Paula Pogány (also known as Paula Pogany Bennett, 30 September 1884 – 3 August 1982) was a Hungarian women's rights activist and pacifist. Her father died when she was young and she left school at the age of sixteen. She worked as the secretary of the Feministák Egyesülete (Feminist Association) and helped organize the 1913 Seventh Conference of the International Woman Suffrage Alliance, hosted by the group in Budapest. Along with Rosika Schwimmer and Adél Spády, she founded two journals, the Modern Ifjúsági Könyvtár (Modern Youth Library) and A Nő és a Társadalom (Women and Society). She was a delegate for both the 1915 Women at the Hague conference and the 1919 Congress of the Women's International League for Peace and Freedom, held in Vienna. She also accompanied Schwimmer on the ill-fated Peace Ship mission in 1916.

In 1919, Pogány moved to Hamburg, Germany, and studied the Mensendieck system of physical education. On receiving her diploma, two years later she joined her brother Willy Pogany in the United States. She worked as a fitness instructor in New York City and naturalized in 1929. Her networks included many feminists and theater people. In 1954, she wrote an influential cookbook about Hungarian cooking, which was republished posthumously in 1997. She is primarily remembered for her activism as an international feminist and pacifist.

== Early life and education ==
Paulina Júlia Feichtmann, known as "Paula", was born on 30 September 1884 in Szeged, Austria-Hungary, to Heléne (née Kolisch) and Joseph Feichtmann. (Note: The Vasváry Collection Newsletter gives their father's name as Vilmos Feuchtmann.) The family was Jewish. She was the youngest of four children, which included two brothers, Nandor and Vilmos, and a half-sister, Ilka. When she was three years old, the family moved into a former convent in Budapest. The building served as a warehouse for her father's mercantile business. He lost the business in a flood of the Danube, and died while the children were young. Their mother supported the family as a seamstress and needleworker. Paula described her mother as the Bohemian of the family and said their childhood home was filled with artists and intellectuals who exposed them to art, books, and music. Although she attended school, Paula quit at the age of sixteen. In October 1903, both Vilmos and Paula legally changed their surname to Pogány. (Note: There is no indication as to why the surname was changed, but it was approved by the Szeged City Council, which requested that the rabbinate correct the registry entry.)

== Career ==
After working briefly in an oil company, Pogány took a position as the secretary of the Feministák Egyesülete (Feminist Association), which was founded in 1904. During the Seventh Conference of the International Woman Suffrage Alliance (IWSA) of 1913, she served as the general secretary of the executive board which organized the Budapest congress. That year, along with Rosika Schwimmer and Adél Spády, she created Modern Ifjúsági Könyvtár (Modern Youth Library), a pioneering journal focused on publishing quality youth literature. The trio also founded A Nő és a Társadalom (Women and Society), as the organ for the Feministák Egyesülete (Women and Society) that year. Becoming the editor of A Nő és a Társadalom, she also worked as a journalist on the Political Commission of the National Suffrage Association. She and Vilma Glücklich represented Feministák Egyesülete at the Women at the Hague conference of 1915.

In 1916, Schwimmer, who by this time was living in the United States, requested that Pogány meet her in Stockholm to assist her with the Peace Ship mission sponsored by Henry Ford. She arrived in January, in time to attend the Neutral Conference for Continuous Mediation. When Ford left Europe before the conference started, Schwimmer attempted to carry on with the project, but withdrew as its coordinator in March 1916. The two women then traveled to the Netherlands to attend a rally celebrating the first anniversary of the Hague congress. Pogány joined the Hungarian Communist Party in 1918. She was selected, along with Glücklich, as a delegate for the Feministák Egyesülete to the 1919 Congress of the Women's International League for Peace and Freedom, held in Vienna.

Soon after the conference, Pogány left Hungary and moved to Hamburg, Germany, to study the Mensendieck system of physical education. The program advocated training in proper breathing, posture, exercise, and the use of non-restrictive clothing, as well as diet to maintain optimal health. After two years of study, she received a diploma and taught while waiting for a visa to the United States to be approved. By that time, her brother Vilmos who had moved to New York City, began using the name Willy Pogany and was working as a set and costume designer. He naturalized as a US citizen in 1921, and that year, Pogány followed him to New York. She began working as a physical education instructor and spent three years also working directly with Bess Mensendieck, who created the exercise techniques she taught. Mensendieck founded the League for Better Bodies in 1924, with Pogány appointed as the organization's secretary. Her business grew quickly through her brother's theatrical contacts and her own feminist networks. Among her clients were the artist Arthur Bowen Davies and his model Wreath McIntyre.

On 26 April 1927, in Stamford, Connecticut, she married Martin Toscan Bennett. Toscan was a corporate lawyer for many years and then worked as a psychologist. He and his first wife Josephine, who had divorced in 1926, had both participated in the campaign for women's suffrage and established Brookwood Labor College in Katonah, New York in 1921. The couple made their home in Manhattan on Central Park West and Pogany Bennett's studio was located at 15 East 59 Street in the Dance School of Adolph Bolm. She was naturalized by the United States in 1929. After Toscan's death in 1940, she summered at the artists' colony in the International Valley at South Kortright, New York. In 1948, Pogany Bennett brought a collection of 300 Hungarian embroideries, which had been assembled by her mother, for display at the McLean Manor House in the village.

In 1954, Pogany Bennett wrote The Art of Hungarian Cooking with Velma R. Clark, a domestic scientist, who tested all of the recipes. The book was illustrated by Willy and received a favorable review by The New York Times, noting that all of the recipes could be made by beginners. The reviewer, Charlotte Turgeon, stated that even the well-known dishes were presented in ways to give them "a special quality" and that the pastry section alone would ensure sales of the book. The chef who wrote reviews for The Evening Star noted that it covered several goose liver appetizers; cold fruit soups and hot vegetable soups; goulashes and other exotic meat dishes; an elaborate vegetable section; and varied desserts. The book was dubbed "fascinating to read" as well as useful, because it gave thorough instructions and a history of the influences of neighboring Balkan, Central European, French, Italian, and Turkish cuisines made with paprika, dill, caraway and both sweet and sour cream.

== Death and legacy ==
Pogany Bennett died on 3 August 1982 and was buried alongside family members of her husband in the Cedar Hill Cemetery in Hartford, Connecticut. Although she is primarily remembered for her activism as an international feminist and pacifist, her cookbook was revised and reissued in 1997.

== See also ==
- List of peace activists
