= Seventh Conference of the International Woman Suffrage Alliance =

June 1913 event

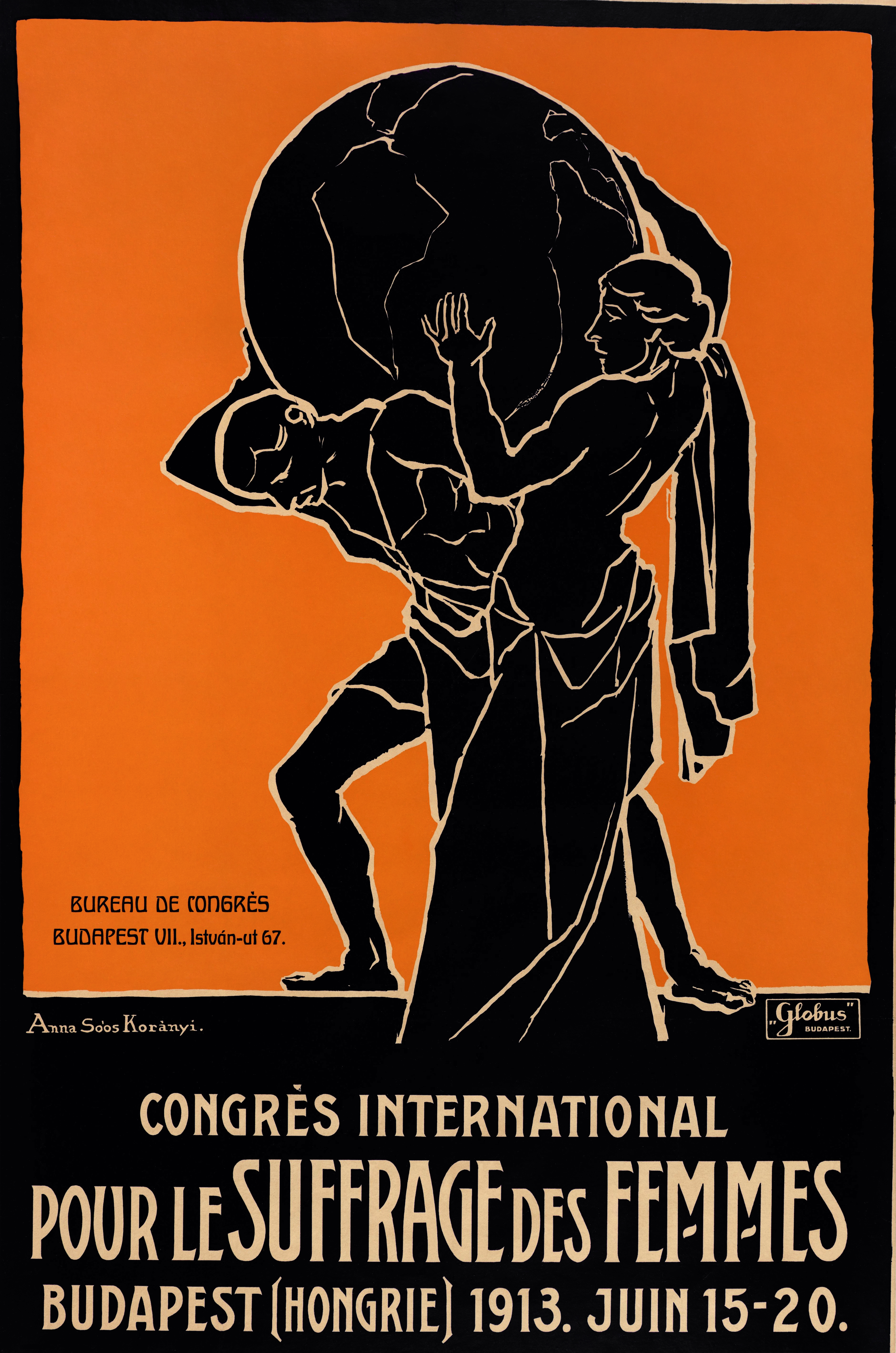
Poster designed by Anna Korànyi for the conference

The Seventh Conference of the International Woman Suffrage Alliance met in Budapest, Hungary, 15–21 June 1913. As had been the case with all the preceding International Woman Suffrage Alliance conferences, the location had been chosen to reflect the status of woman suffrage: a place where the prospects seemed favorable and liable to influence public sentiment by demonstrating that it was now a global movement. When it had been announced at the sixth congress (in Stockholm) that the next one would be held in the capital of Hungary, it was felt that the location seemed very remote, and there were concerns that Hungary did not have representative government. In fact, it proved to be one of the largest and most important conventions. Furthermore, the delegates stopped en route for mass meetings and public banquets in Berlin, Dresden, Prague and Vienna, spreading its influence ever further afield.

== Organization ==
The executive committee was headed by Iska Teleki, a well-known Hungarian writer. Vice presidents on the committee included Sándor Giesswein, a member of Parliament; Vilma Glücklich and Rosika Schwimmer, co-founders of Feministák Egyesülete; Ilona Haller, a suffragist; and György Lukács, Minister of Education. Other members included Paula Pogány, as executive secretary; Janka Dirnfeld, treasurer. Ida Molnár de Kapos, controller; Miksa Racz, Adél Spády, Sándorné Szegvári, recording secretaries; Hilda Behr, interpreters secretary; Aranka Bálint, excursions chair; Gisella de Békássy, chair of promotion; Flora Békássy, chair of the Commission of Youth; Berta Engel, businesswoman; Jane de Lánczy, festivities chair; Eugénia Miskolczy Meller; chair of guides; Katinka Pejacsevich, artistic chair; Franciska Schwimmer, music chair; Ida Seenger, finance secretary; Sarolta Steinberger, physician; Irma Szirmay de Nagysáros, interpreters chair; and Olga Ungar, hospitality chair.

Schwimmer organized the convention, the first of its kind ever held in the Austro-Hungarian Empire. For communication, the event used a cable address of "Suffragium, Budapest" and a general address of, "Congressbureau, VII. Istvan ut 67, Budapest". Both the government and the municipality made financial contributions, adequately supplemented by citizens to cover all the expenses. A sale of 2,800 season tickets was made. With the assistance of various committees, efforts were made to ensure the comfort of the delegates, who were cared for from the moment they arrived at the station. English-speaking university students and competent citizens helped to overcome language difficulties. The students had trained for at least a year and each was required to learn at least one language. To assist delegates, each wore a badge that was color-coded to allow those in attendance to know what language they could interpret. Excursions around the country were provided by the railroads and the navigation company.

== Representation ==
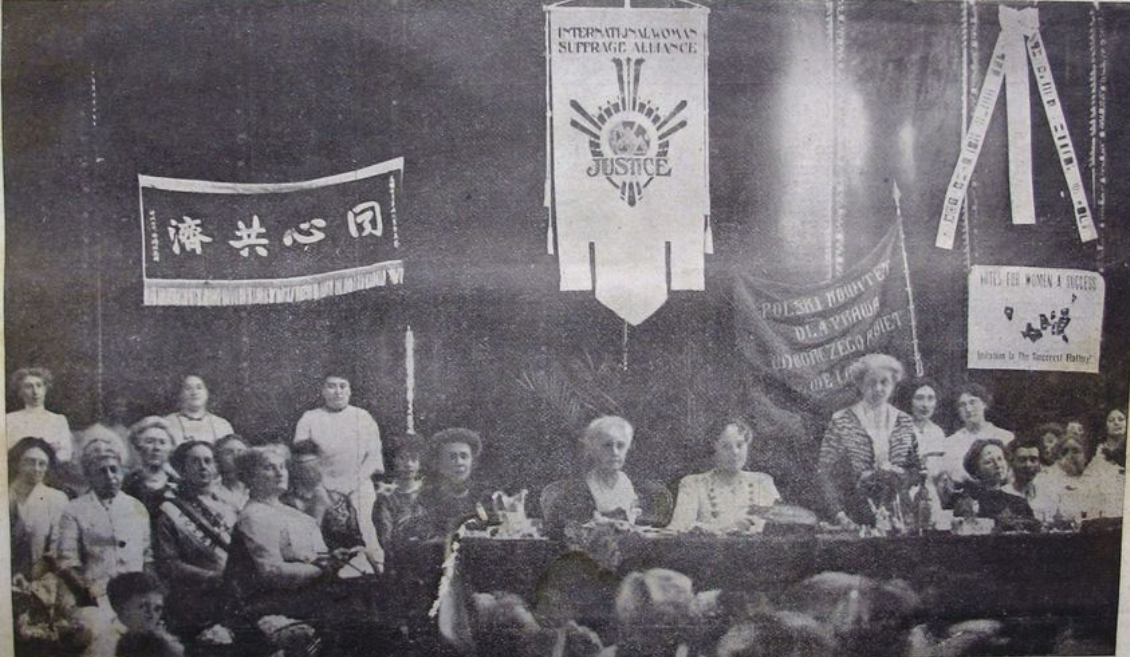
Presidential table during the Seventh congress of the International Woman Suffrage Alliance IWSA in Budapest 1913

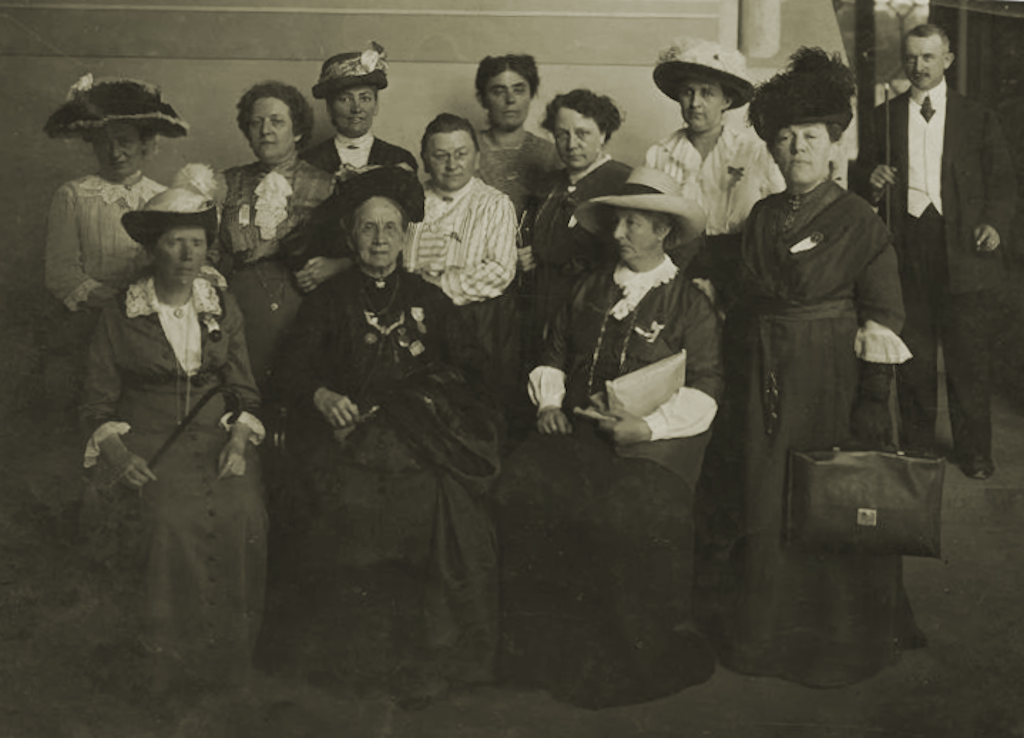
Feminists at the conference: seated (l-r): Tekla Hultin (Finland), Belva Lockwood (United States), Anita Augspurg (Germany) standing (l-r): Leopolda Kulka (Austria), Zdeňka Wiedermannová-Motyčkova (Moravia), Marie Tůmová (Bohemia), Anna Šchŏntagová (Bohemia), Vil. Mohr (Germany), Maria Moravcová-Štěpánková (Bohemia), Elsa Beer-Angerer (Austria), Berta Englová, and Nagy Susany

Twenty-two countries were represented by 240 delegates and alternates. The full quota of 24 were present from Germany, the Netherlands, Sweden, Great Britain, the United States and Hungary. Finland sent fifteen delegates; Denmark and Norway, eleven each; Switzerland, nine; Italy, eight; Russia, five; Belgium, Austria, and South Africa, four each; Canada, three; Iceland, two; and Bohemia, one. Other countries and regions included Australia, Bulgaria, France, Persia, Portugal, Serbia, Siam, Spain, and Turkey, each sending representatives, and delegates were present for the first time from Burma, China, Egypt, India, Japan, and the Philippines. The convention was the first similar large-scale event held in Austria-Hungary and in total, there were around 3,000 international delegates. Many of the delegates were professional women and were bankers, economists, lawyers, mayors, municipal councilors, parliamentarians, and teachers.

Gertrude L. (Burke) Spencer was an official delegate of the government of Australia, while Norway was represented by the president of the National Suffrage Association, Fredrikke Marie Qvam, and the president of the National Council of Women, Gina Krog. Other delegates included Eline Hansen, Denmark; Annie Furuhjelm, Finland; Emilia Pardo Bazán, Spain; Selma Lagerlöf, Sweden; Marchese Lucifera, Italy; Catharina van Rennes, Netherlands; Flora MacD. Denison, Canada; and Flora Annie Steel, England. Among the American women in attendance were Jane Addams, Alva Belmont, Carrie Chapman Catt, Isabel Lockman Helmuth, Anna Maxwell Jones, Katharine Dexter McCormick, Anna Howard Shaw, and Fanny Garrison Villard. The Governors of California, Oregon and Washington had appointed representatives.

Written or telegraphed greetings were received from nineteen countries. Fraternal delegates —163 were present from twelve countries— offered their greetings and a large number advocated for their organizations. A resolution was adopted that no credentials should be accepted until the society presenting them was approved by the National Suffrage Association of its country and no fraternal delegate should speak except by invitation of the president of the Alliance and with the consent of the congress. This checked a torrent of oratory and allowed the convention to keep to its program. The Chinese Woman Suffrage Society was admitted, for which Catt had sown the seeds at the time of her visit to that country, and the embroidered banner they had sent was presented to the Alliance by Dr. Aletta Jacobs, president of the Vereeniging voor Vrouwenkiesrecht (Dutch Association for Women's Suffrage), who had accompanied her. The president of the Belgian Association reported that Roman Catholic, Conservative, Socialist and Progressive women had united in a non-partisan federation to work only for woman suffrage. Dutch newspapers reported that the women's movement had united Buddhists, Christians, Confucians, Hindus, Jews, and Muslims in their fight for rights. The associations from South Africa, Romania and Portugal were received as full members, as was a committee from Galicia, where women were not allowed to form an association. The Galician delegation presented a banner. Greetings came by cable from the women of Persia.

== Program and venues ==
A reception given Saturday evening, 14 June, by the National Suffrage Association at the Gerbaud Pavilion enabled officers, delegates and members of the committees to meet and establish friendships.

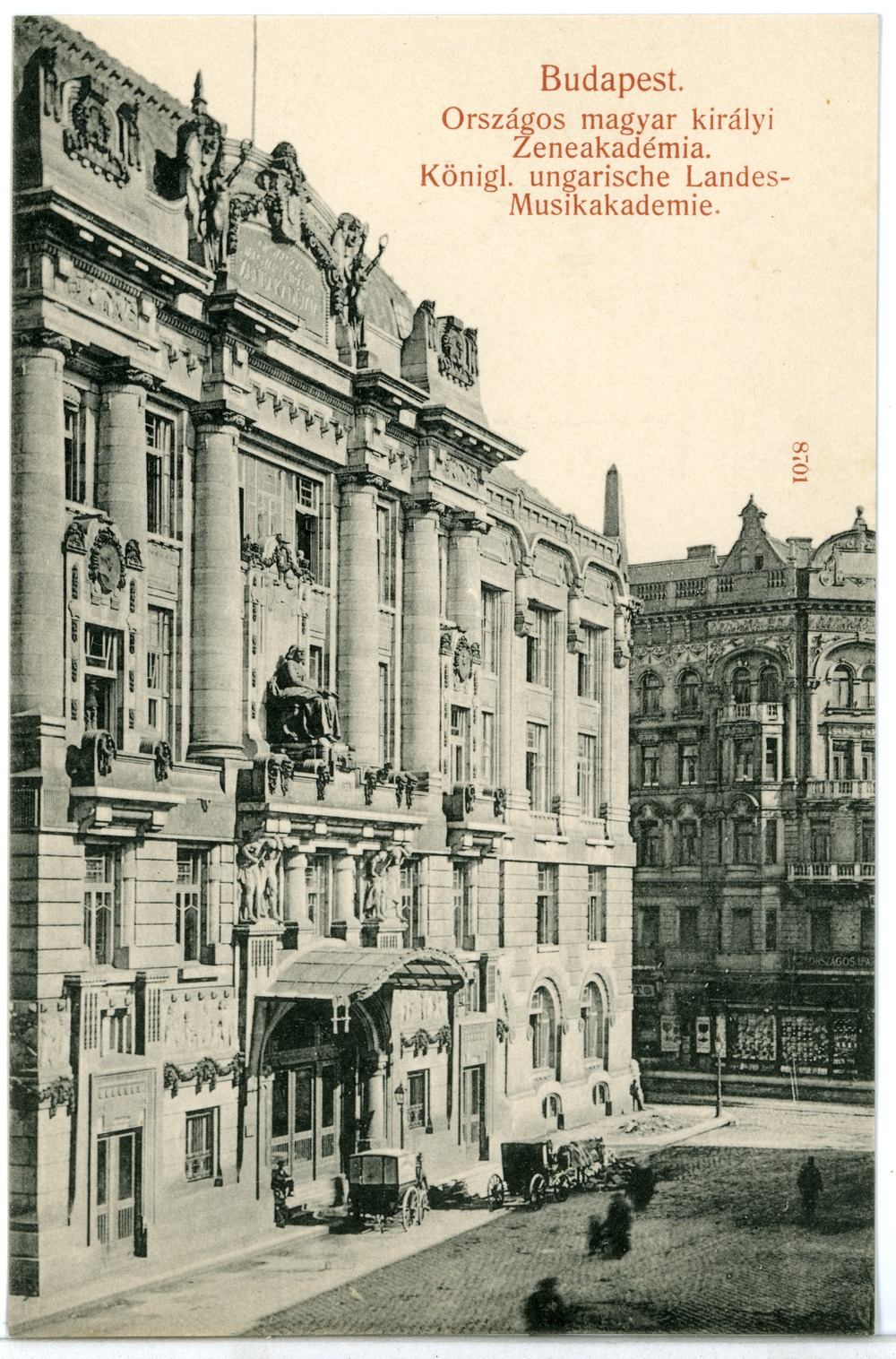
Academy of Music

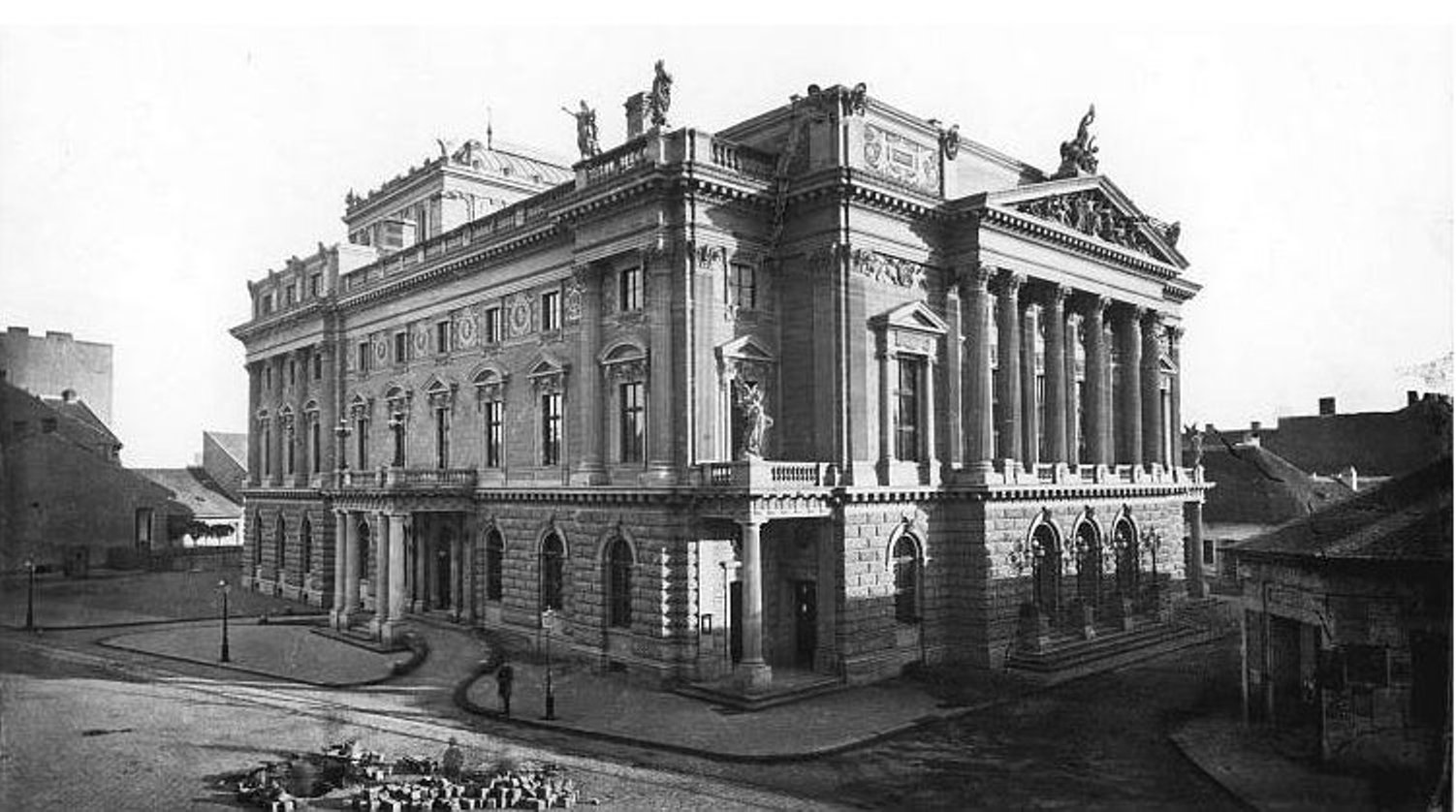
National Theater (Népszínház building)

On Sunday morning, 15 June, Dr. Shaw conducted religious services at the Protestant church in Buda, assisted by the Rev. Eliza Tupper Wilkes, by courtesy of its minister, the Rev. Benő Haypál. In accordance with local custom, the convention was opened on the Sunday afternoon. At 4:00 pm, a large audience assembled in the Academy of Music for the official welcome, which began with an overture by the orchestra of the National Theater, composed for the occasion by Dr. Aladár Rényi. A special ode written by Emil Ábrányi was recited in Hungarian by Mari Jászai and in English by Erzsi Paulay, both actresses from the National Theater. Greetings were given by Countess Teleki, chairman of the Committee of Arrangements, and Glücklich, president of the National Suffrage Association. The official welcome of the Government was extended by His Excellency Dr. Béla Jankovich, Minister of Education, and that of the city by Dr. István Bárczy, the Burgomaster. The response from the Alliance was made by its secretary, Dr. Anna Lindemann, in German and French. Dr. Giesswein, a member of the Hungarian Parliament, made a strong address in favor of woman suffrage. These ceremonies were followed by the president's address of Catt. On the Sunday evening after the opening of the convention, the Royal Opera, a State institution, gave a special gala performance of Mozart's Die Entführung aus dem Serail, with Cupid's Tricks, by the full ballet.

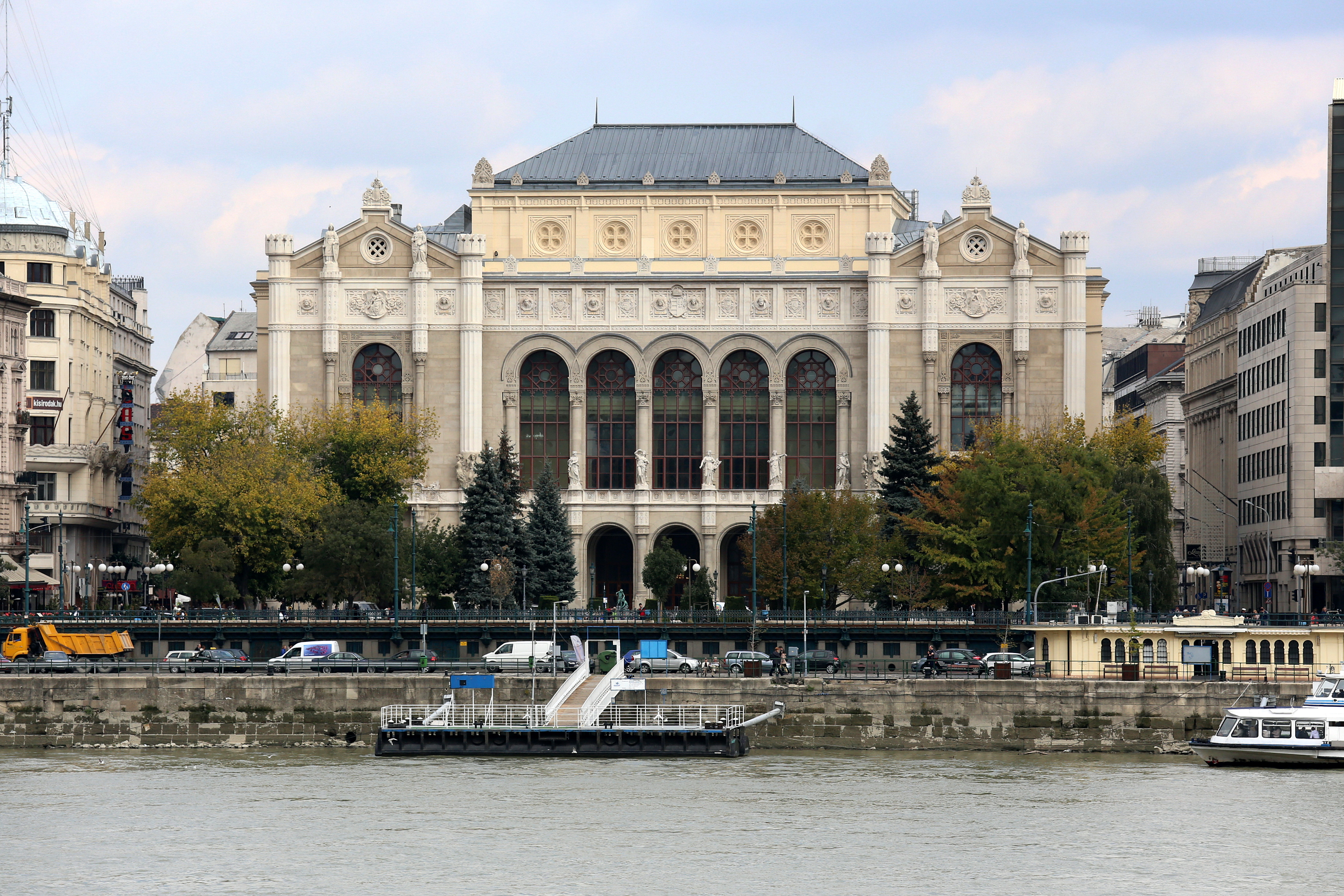
Le Redoute (Pesti Vigadó)

The formal organization for business took place Monday morning in the Redoute, a large, attractive convention hall on the banks of the Danube. At 7:30, the municipality gave an open air fete on Fisherman's Bastion.

It was soon evident that the business of the convention would have to be confined to the hours of 9 a.m. to 2 p.m., as the afternoons and evenings had to be given over to public speech-making and social functions. The women often worked until three or four in the morning to put together plans and exchange ideas regarding attaining suffrage. There was lengthy discussion in several sessions on establishing international headquarters and a press bureau, enlarging the monthly paper, Jus Suffragii, and changing the place of its publication. After most of the delegates had expressed opinions, the matter was left to the board of officers. The treasurer, Adela Coit, made a detailed and acceptable report and said that, with new headquarters, a paid secretary, an enlarged newspaper and many publications, £2,000 would be needed for the next two years. Pledges were made for £2,510.

After serving as president for nine years, Catt sincerely wished to retire in favor of a woman from another country but at a meeting of the presidents of all the auxiliaries, she was unanimously and vigorously urged to reconsider her wish. She reluctantly did so and was elected by acclamation. The delegates decided that the ten persons receiving the highest number of votes should constitute the officers of the Alliance and the board itself should apportion their special offices. Millicent Fawcett, Coit, Furuhjelm, Signe Bergman, and Lindemann were re-elected. The five new officers selected were Marguerite de Witt-Schlumberger, France; Schwimmer, Hungary; Chrystal Macmillan, Great Britain; Marie Stritt, Germany; and McCormick, United States.

The persistent request that the Board should endorse the "militant" movement in Great Britain, which had assumed serious proportions, resulted in a resolution that the international organization was neutral regarding the tactics used by various national associations to secure women's rights. The resolution was adopted without dissent. Catt introduced and supported a resolution "to send from this congress a request to the Governments of all countries here represented to institute an international inquiry into the cause and extent of commercialized vice, and to ask the woman suffrage organizations in each country to petition their own Government to institute a national inquiry and to include women in the Commission". The resolution was unanimously adopted. The only other resolution adopted by the full congress dealt with a request that governments study the causes and extent of commercialized vice within their countries. Catt was appointed to represent the Alliance at the approaching International White Slave Traffic Congress in London and stressed to the delegates the need for governments to take the issue seriously and employ rigorous scientific methods in their studies. An address was made by Fawcett, who presided at the meeting held to discuss "What Women Voters Have Done towards the Solution of this Problem".

Reports of the progress in all the affiliated countries were presented and ordered published in the Minutes, where they filled over sixty pages. Besides progress in the suffrage movement, reports were given on advances in official recognition of women's issues, noting governmental sanctioning of and funding for women's congresses. Among the numerous topics reports were given on child protection and welfare, educational reform, employment rights, slave trafficking, and temperance, among others, and democracy, public health, and the pending war were discussed. Discussion concerning political neutrality was referred to a committee, as delegates were unable to agree on whether the international stance should be to create women's rights committees within existing political parties or maintain political neutrality.

A crowded mass meeting addressed by women took place one evening in the Academy of Music, with Catt presiding. Stritt, president of the National Suffrage Association of Germany, spoke on Woman Suffrage and Eugenics; Maria Vérone, a well known lawyer from Paris, made an impassioned address in French, and Dr. Gulli Petrini of Sweden spoke in French on Woman Suffrage and Democracy; Schwimmer inspired the audience with Hungarian oratory; Addams of the U.S. gave a forceful address on "Why the Modern Woman Needs the Ballot", and Dr. Shaw closed the meeting with an interpretation of the demand of women for the vote. One afternoon from 4 to 6 pm was devoted to a Young People's Meeting, addressed by delegates from eight countries. A morning was devoted to discussion of the ever vital question "What Relation Should Suffrage Organizations Bear toward Political Parties", led by Anna B. Wicksell, Sweden, and Kathleen Courtney, Great Britain. A large audience heard one evening the Benefits of Woman Suffrage related by those who had been sent as official delegates from Governments that had given the vote to women, Qvam, Krog and Spencer, and in supplementary speeches by Jenny af Forselles, member of Parliament from Finland; A. Maude Royden, Great Britain; Charlotte Perkins Gilman, United States, whose topic was New Mothers of a New World. A resume of all these addresses was made in Hungarian by Glücklich. During the convention much of the interpreting in English, French and German was done by Maud Nathan of the United States, who also made an address in the three languages.

A list was given of distinguished men who had converted to woman suffrage. Men took a more prominent part in this convention than in any which had preceded, due principally to the very active Hungarian Men's League for Woman Suffrage, which included a number well known men active in political and intellectual life. The International Alliance of Men's Leagues conducted an afternoon session in the Pester Lloyd Hall with the Hon. Georg de Lukacs of Hungary, its president, in the chair. "What can Men Do to Help the Movement for Woman Suffrage?" was discussed by Dr. Charles Drysdale, Great Britain; Lieutenant Colonel W. A. E. Mansfeldt, Netherlands; (Note: The History of Woman Suffrage text on page 856 lists Dr. C. V. Drysdale, Great Britain and Major C. V. Mansfeldt, Netherlands. W. A. E. (Wicher Arnold Emil) Mansfeldt was a Dutch military officer who founded and was president of the Mannenbond voor Vrouwenkiesrecht (Men's International Alliance for Women's Suffrage) and attended the Sixth Conference of the International Woman Suffrage Alliance. Dutch newspapers confirm Mansfeldt attended the Seventh Congress, and lived until 1924. It seems likely that "C. V." Mansfelt was a typographical error.) and Dr. Andor Máday, Hungary. After this first discussion the men resolved to publicize the issue of women's rights urging the governments of countries which had not given women suffrage to look at those countries which had extended the vote and take note that it had not harmed family life or society.

On the Thursday evening, this International League held a mass meeting in the Academy of Music with rousing speeches for woman suffrage by Hermann Bahr, Austria; Jean-Marie Thomas Moreau du Breuil de Saint-Germain, France; Major Mansfeldt; Keir Hardie, Great Britain; and Senator Leo Mechelin, Finland; Dr. Vilmos Vázsonyi, M. P., Hungary; Professor Knut Wicksell, Sweden; Professor Gusztáv Szászy-Schwartz, Hungary. On the last day, it almost seemed as if the men had taken possession of the congress, for they had secured the convention hall for the afternoon meeting, but the women did not want to discourage the exceptional interest. "Woman Suffrage and Men's Economic, Ethical and Political Interest in it" was discussed by Prof. Emanuel Beke, Hungary; Dr. Emil von Hoffmansthal, Austria; Frederick Nathan and Rabbi Stephen S. Wise, United States. Vigorous speeches were made by J. Malcolm Mitchell, Great Britain; Leo Gassman, Germany; the Rev. Haypál, and Sándor Patai, Hungary.

At 5:00 pm on the last day, 21 June, the final program began under the general topic, "How may women still bound by ancient custom, tradition and prejudice be awakened to a realization that these new times demand new duties and responsibilities?" "How to Reach the Home Woman", Gisela Urban, Austria; Szirmay and Mrs. von Fiirth, Hungary; "How to Reach the Church Woman", Jane Brigode, Belgium, Antonia Girardet-Vielle, Switzerland; "How to Reach the Society Woman", Royden and Schlumberger; "How to Reach the Woman of Higher Education", Crystal Eastman Benedict, United States; "How to Reach the Wage-earning Woman", Isabella O. Ford, Mrs. Clinny Dryer, Great Britain; and "How to Reach the Woman Social Worker", Addams.

== Preparations for future convenings ==
Several countries competed for the honor of holding the conference of the Alliance in 1915 and its regular convention in 1917. May Wright Sewall, honorary president of the International Council of Women, presented an official invitation from the managers of the Panama Pacific Exposition to be held in San Francisco in 1915, endorsed by the California Equal Suffrage Association; the executive committee of the National Suffrage Association of Germany extended an urgent request for the conference and that of France for the congress. The answer was referred to the board, and it later accepted the invitations to Berlin and Paris. This had been the largest meeting of the Alliance. When they parted with the bright hope of meeting two years later in Berlin, they little knew that it would be seven years before they came together again and that during this time, the world would be devastated by World War I, and that it would be necessary once more to start the task of developing the spirit of confidence, friendship and cooperation among the women of the nations involved.

== See also ==
- International Alliance of Women
