= Bertha Katscher =

Hungarian writer born in Austria-Hungary

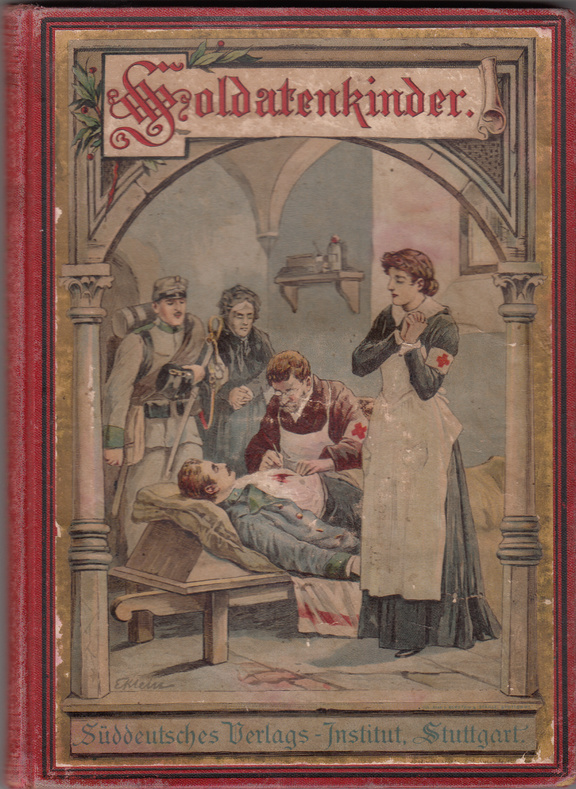
Katscher's 1897 book Soldatenkinder

Bertha Katscher (also spelled, Berta; pseudonyms: Ludwig Ungar, Albert Kellner, Ludwig Kölle, Ludmilla Kölle; 12 June 1860 – 16 September 1903) was an Austrian Empire-born Hungarian writer.

== Biography ==
Katscher was born at Trencín, Slovakia, June 12, 1860, to an affluent Jewish family. She was educated by her aunt, by whom she was taken to Herzegovina, where in 1881 she was married to her cousin, Leopold Katscher, the writer and peace activist. Up to this time she had been occupied mostly with household affairs, but at the wish of her husband, she embarked on a literary career. Her first attempts were fairy-tales for children, but she soon turned her efforts to the advocacy of universal peace and various economic reforms. She wrote also against cruelty to animals. She contributed articles on a great variety of subjects to the “Frankfurter Zeitung,” the “Wiener Mode,” “Die Heimat,” “Münchener Allgemeine Zeitung,” “Kölnische Zeitung,” “Prochaska's Monatsbände,” etc. Her first work in book form was “Die Kunst ein Mensch zu Sein,” written in 1887 with Edward John Hardy. Her other works included: “Weinachtsgeschichte” (1890); “Aus Bädern und Sommerfrischen” (1890); “Hermann Vámbérys Leben und Reiseabenteuer” (1892); “Soldatenkinder,” a romance of universal peace (1897); “Die Studentin" (1900); and “Der Stychoos” (1901). She also translated English literature into German, such as the novels by Hardy, Donnelly, Boyesen, Meadows, Stevenson, and Buckley.

Katscher had been operated upon twice for cancer of the right breast. Shortly after the second operation, she consulted, for blindness of the left eye, Dr. Wilhelm Goldzieher, of Budapest, who sent her to Dr. Adamkiewicz with a diagnosis of cancerous infiltration of the choroid and partial detachment of the retina. This diagnosis was confirmed by Dr. Sachs, assistant in the ophthalmological clinic of the University of Vienna. Sachs also followed up his ophthalmoscopic examinations during the treatment by cancroine, and certified to actual resorption of a cancerous process and restoration of vision to two thirds of normal. The conditions in the breast cicatrix were also improved.

The feminist and pacifist, Rosika Schwimmer, was her niece. Rosika Schwimmer's mother was also named Berta, but she was the sister of Leopold and this Berta Katscher was the wife of Leopold. Katscher died in Budapest in 1903.
