= Feminist Association =

Hungarian women's rights organization (1904–1942)

Part of the Feministák Egyesülete membership 1924: left to right: Melanie Vámbéry, Flóra Irma Havas, Irma Szirmai, unknown, Vilma Glücklich, Eugénia Miskolczy Meller, unknown. Back row l to r: Nora Kunfi, unknown, Gizella Fekete, Klara Kozma-Glücklich, Mrs. Fekee?, Laura Polányi-Stricker, unknown

The Hungarian Feminist Association (Hungarian: Feministák Egyesülete (FE), 1904–1942) was created by Rosika Schwimmer and Vilma Glücklich. The organization pushed for women's equality in Hungary in all spheres of women's life. In addition to pressing for women's suffrage, they drafted replies to modification of the marriage statutes and urged government response to address employment and training for women workers.

== History ==
Both Vilma Glücklich and Rosika Schwimmer came from backgrounds of organizing and protecting women laborers and moved into the sphere of women's issues more generally. Developing contacts with the international women's movement, Schwimmer corresponded with women like Marie Lang and Adelheid Popp of Austria and Aletta Jacobs of the Netherlands. These prominent feminists urged establishment of a Hungarian women's organization which would bring the varied interests of other women's organizations into a united focus. Jacobs, in particular, urged Schwimmer to create an organization which would be admitted to the International Council of Women (ICW). She also urged her to attend the Congress to be held in 1904 in Berlin. Glücklich and Schwimmer both decided to go to the conference and were exposed to the support network and common issues international women shared. They returned to Budapest and founded the Feminist Association (Hungarian: Feministák Egyesülete (FE)) shortly after their return. Almost immediately, the organization joined the International Woman Suffrage Alliance (IWSA) as the Hungarian affiliate.

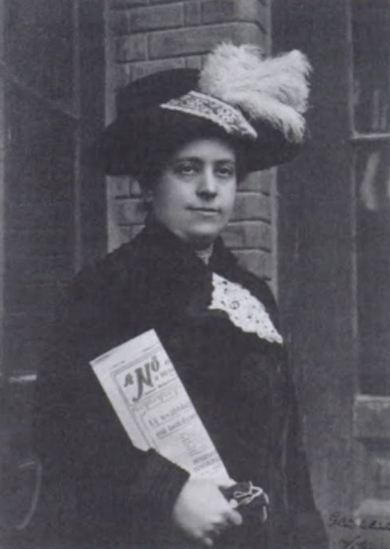
Vilma Glücklich holding the journal of Feministák Egyesülete, A Nő—Feminista Folyóirat

Glücklich was the acting managing director and practical adviser of the association, while Schwimmer, chaired the Political Committee and served as editor of the association journals. The goals of the organization were to address the socio-economic and political inequalities which affected women. They had strong ties and a friendly working relationship with Mariska Gárdos, who headed the Hungarian National Association of Women Workers (Hungarian: Magyarországi Nőtisztviselők Országos Egyesületének (NOE)) While Women's Suffrage was one issue that the group strove to address, they were also concerned with equal pay, equal access to education, and civil and legal reforms to improve women's lives. FE also fought against the moral decay of society and child labor, providing lectures through a counseling program, "Select a Profession", which offered career guidance to young women. The program also provided educational materials to teach parenting skills which included lectures on sex education, children's health and education. In 1907, Irma Szirmai (also Szirmay) was placed in charge of the Mother and Child Protection Committee, which provided legal counseling, job placement services, stipends for day care, housing for refugees, and foster care placements. The organization founded two journals to educate women on issues and discuss feminist developments: Women and Society (Hungarian: A Nő és a Társadalom) (1907-1913) and Woman—A feminist journal (Hungarian: A Nő—Feminista Folyóirat) (1914-1927). Eugénia Miskolczy Meller, one of the founding members, who substituted for Schwimmer when she was abroad, eventually replaced Schwimmer on the Political Committee in 1914.

Meller drafted the FE's analyses of the marriage regulation reform for the 1913 Hungarian Civil Code, calling for gender equality and equal treatment. She was also one of the lead organizers of the 1913 ISWA conference held in Budapest and the 1916 Feminist Conference, which officials banned because the women were urging pacifism. That same year, FE urged the Parliament to address the issue of women's employment and training, as there were so many widows and wives of those injured in the war who had become responsible for being family wager earners. When Glücklich died in 1927, Szirmai took over her position as co-leader of FE, but had to withdraw due to a family situation, leaving sole leadership of FE under the direction of Meller. Melanie Vámbéry served as the secretary of the organization from around 1913 until she removed to the countryside in 1938 to hide from the Nazis; she died in a concentration camp during World War II.

In addition to their work in Budapest, the FE carried out organizational work throughout the country holding lectures and establishing branch associations. The organization was banned for pacifist activities in 1942, though secretly continued activities until May, 1944, when Meller was arrested and a few months later was sent to the Kistarcsa detention center. The association reorganized in 1946, with Szirmai as chair. She led the organization's memorial service held for Schwimmer in 1948, but FE was dissolved by the government again in 1949. In 1958, Noémi Kóbor, the last secretary of the organization, donated the records in her possession to the National Széchényi Library. As they were unable to preserve them, the library in turn sent them to the National Archives of Hungary the following year. A portion of the organization's papers are located within the Rosika Schwimmer Papers at the New York Public Library where she deposited them in 1920.
