= Eugénia Miskolczy Meller =

Hungarian feminist

- 1913, photograph for the Budapest conference by Olga Máté
- Born: Eugénia Miskolczy; 14 January 1872; Budapest, Austria-Hungary
- Died: 1944/1945; Hungary
- Other names: Eugénia Miskolczi, Mrs. Artur Meller, Eugénia Mellerné-Miskolczy
- Occupations: Women's rights activist, teacher
- Years active: 1904-1941
- Spouse: Artúr Meller
- Children: Vilmos; Laura; Erzsébet; Rózsa

Eugénia Miskolczy Meller (Hungarian: Mellerné Miskolczy Eugénia; 14 January 1872 – 1944/1945) was one of the most active feminists and women's rights activists in Hungary from the turn of the century through the interwar period. One of the founding members of the Feminist Association, she served as a leader for many of the organizations committees and events, arguing for gender equality, as well as women's suffrage. A pacifist, Meller worked with the Women's International League for Peace and Freedom (WILPF) arguing for disarmament and urging the passage of international laws codifying citizenship regulations to protect women. Though she had converted to Lutheranism, she was arrested when the Nazis invaded Hungary in 1944 and disappeared. In 1946, she was posthumously honored for her humanitarian works.

== Early life ==
Eugénia Miskolczy was born on 14 January 1872 in Budapest, Austria-Hungary to the Hungarian-Jewish family of Laura (née Weisz or Weiss) and Adolf Miskolczy. She was the only surviving child of the family, as her older brother József, aged six, died in 1876; her sister Irén, aged five, died in 1879; and her sister Laura, aged four, died in 1883. Her father was a craftsman originally from Hódmezővásárhely and her mother was originally from Buda. After being privately educated in music and languages, Miskolczy married Artúr Meller, an inspector at the National Bank of Hungary in 1896. The couple had four children: Vilmos, Laura, Erzsébet and Rózsa.

== Career ==
In 1904, Meller was one of the founding members of the Feminist Association (Hungarian: Feministák Egyesülete (FE)), a women's rights organization founded to achieve gender equality. By 1906, she was serving on the board of the organization and was giving lectures for parent conferences the organization sponsored. The lectures covered a variety of topics including education, health, including sex education, and employment training. In addition, she wrote and published articles in journals like Women and Society (Hungarian: A Nő és a Társadalom) and Woman—A feminist journal (Hungarian: A Nő—Feminista Folyóirat), which called for civil inequalities for men and women to be addressed. Meller later became the editor of Woman, as well as a lecturer who traveled throughout Hungary speaking on women's issues.

In 1909, she was a participant in the Women's International League for Peace and Freedom (WILPF) congress held in London.

As early as 1912, Meller had begun to serve as a substitute for Rosika Schwimmer, who headed the political committee focused on suffrage, when Schwimmer was unable to fulfill the obligations of the chair. In 1913, Meller authored a critique of the Hungarian Civil Code's marriage regulations, while simultaneously serving as a member of the committee responsible for the preparations for the International Woman Suffrage Alliance (IWSA) congress held in Budapest that year.

When Schwimmer moved to London in 1914, Meller became the de facto leader of the political committee.

During World War I, Meller became active in pacifism and was one of the main forces which drove FE to endorse pacifism, while other feminist organizations remained focused on supporting the war effort. The stance resulted in censorship of Woman and the prevention by authorities of the 1916 Feminist Congress, which Meller had planned to use as a public demonstration against the war. When the war ended, Meller resumed her pressure for suffrage and when partial suffrage was granted in 1919, urged members of the FE to support the only female candidate to run in the parliamentary elections of 1920, Margit Slachta, in spite of Slachta's positions, which they considered to be anti-feminist. That same year, Meller and her family converted to Lutheranism, and she attended the WILPF conference in Geneva. She also pressed for educational opportunities for women and in 1923, sent a memorandum to the government, signed by other FE members as well, denouncing the Budapest Medical University's decision to bar female students from enrollment. Meller also wrote articles stressing the importance of equal pay and access to unemployment benefits for men and women.

During the interwar period, Meller, who spoke fluent English and French, was employed by the Társadalmi Múzeum, the social museum of Budapest, as well as a language instructor. In 1923, she served as a consultant at the executive meeting of the WILPF held in Dresden and in 1926, she served as a delegate to the Paris Peace Congress. The following year, when Vilma Glücklich, who was the president of FE died, Meller became the recognized leader of the organization.

From the 1920s to 1935, she participated in the international congresses of IWSA and WILPF, urging disarmament, lobbying for women's issues to be part of the League of Nations platform, and pressing for international legislation to address statelessness and lack of legal protections for women. On one of those trips in 1924, Meller came to the United States and participated in several speaking engagements for WILPF. In 1932, in protest of the execution of Sándor Fürst and Imre Sallai, Meller wrote a pamphlet against using capital punishment for those accused of political crimes. When the Nazis annexed Austria in 1938, Meller's colleague, Rosika Schwimmer tried to persuade Carrie Chapman Catt to sign an affidavit allowing both Meller and Sarolta Steinberger to emigrate to the United States. Catt refused on the grounds of her age and the responsibility that such an affidavit would entail.

The FE was forced to dissolve in 1941 by the authorities and Meller became a target of the Gestapo, who arrested her four times. When the Germans occupied Hungary in March 1944, Meller was arrested and taken to the Kistarcsa detention camp in July.

== Death and legacy ==
The circumstances of Meller's death are murky. Some sources state she died in captivity at Kistarcsa in late 1944. Andrea Pető found evidence that Meller may have survived the war. A credit application by her dated 13 August 1945, which was not authenticated because it did not bear Meller's signature, was submitted to the municipal authorities of Budapest to reconstruct a property her husband had owned. A guardianship of his mother was granted to her son, Vilmos Meller, on 12 October 1945, who eventually applied in his own name to restore the property in 1948.

In December 1946, the Magyar Közlöny carried a notice that Meller had been posthumously awarded the silver honorarium of the Hungarian Order of Freedom.
