= Rudolf Dührkoop =

German photographer (1848–1918)

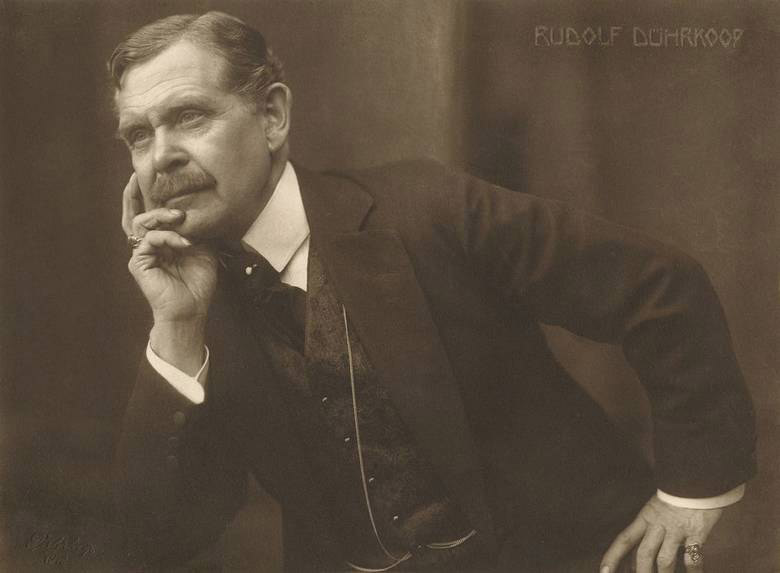
Self-portrait (1912)

Rudolf Johannes Dührkoop (1 August 1848 – 3 April 1918) was a German portrait photographer and one of the leading early representatives of pictorialism.

== Biography ==
Dührkoop was born to Christian Friederich Dührkoop, a carpenter, and his wife, Johanna Friederica Emile, in Hamburg. After serving in the Franco-Prussian War, he returned home and married Maria Louise Caroline Matzen. They had two daughters, Hanna Maria Theresia and Julie Wilhelmine, who also became a photographer, under the name Minya Diez-Dührkoop. He was initially a railroad employee, then worked as a salesman. During this time, he developed an interest in photography, and spent several years learning how to do it on his own. He published his first professional article on the subject in 1882. That same year, he applied for and was issued a photographer's license. Six months later, he opened his own studio.

From the very beginning, he worked as a portrait photographer, and was quite successful. His daughter, Julie (Minya), became his assistant in 1887, aged only fourteen, and he moved to a larger studio the following year. In 1890, he opened a second studio, in Altona. He was also accepted as a member of the Photographische Gesellschaft in Vienna, as well as similar groups in Berlin and Weimar.

He held his first exhibition at a professional society in 1898. His portraits showed casual poses, without props or backdrops, where the subjects' attention was not focused on the camera. They received harsh criticism from the jurors. Two years later, he participated in the Exposition Universelle in Paris, where his works were given more positive reviews. By then, he had begun taking some photographs outdoors. A grant from the Hamburg Chamber of Commerce enabled him to attend the Louisiana Purchase Exposition, and visit the studios of several notable photographers throughout the United States.

In 1905, he was elected a member of the Royal Photographic Society in London. The following year, he opened an even larger studio, occupying two floors, and made Minya his legal partner. This left him free to open a portrait workshop in Berlin in 1909. He continued to work there and hold exhibitions until his death, although interest in his style of photography slowly waned. After his death, Minya took over the studio and maintained it until her own death in 1929. He was interred in the Ohlsdorf Cemetery.

== Selected portraits ==
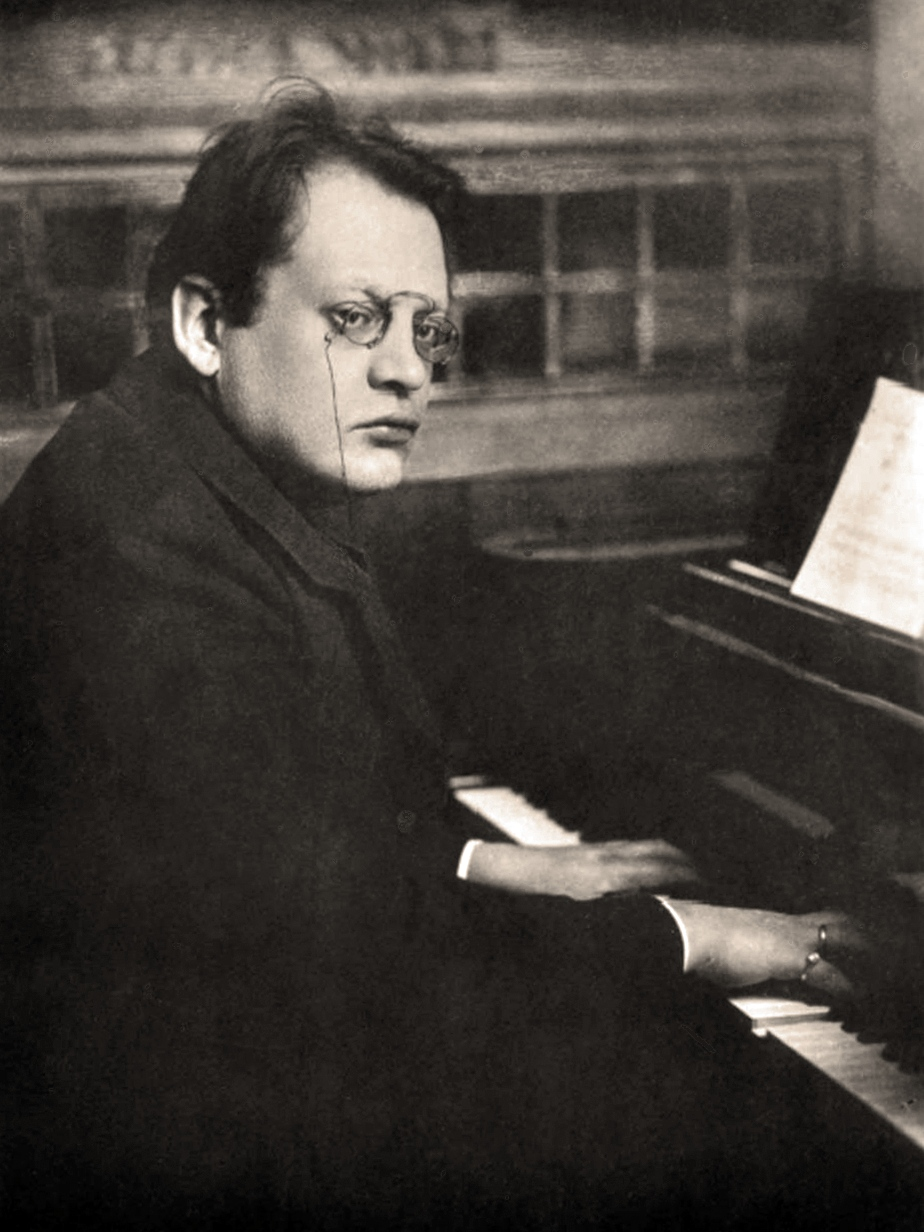
Max Reger

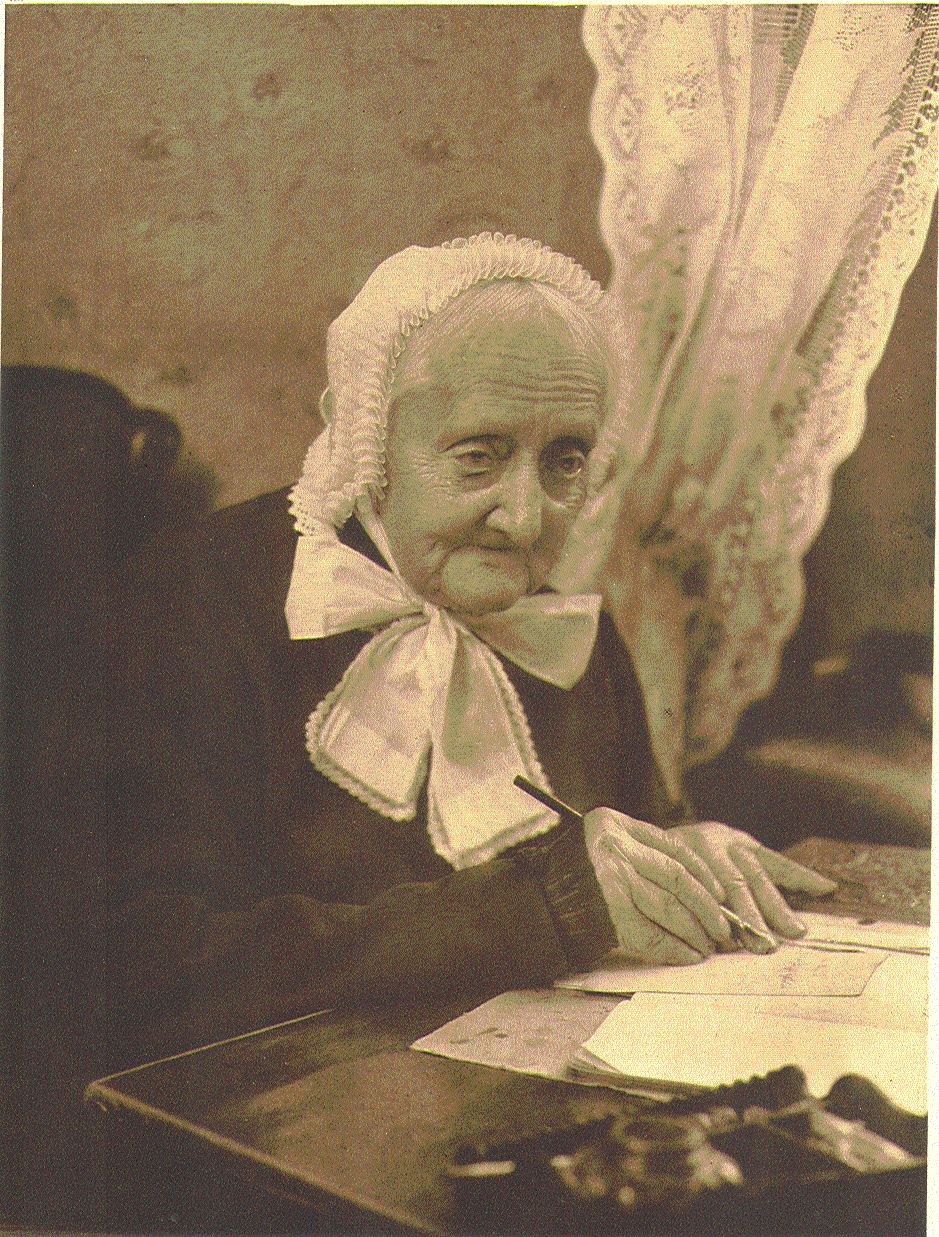
Elise Averdieck

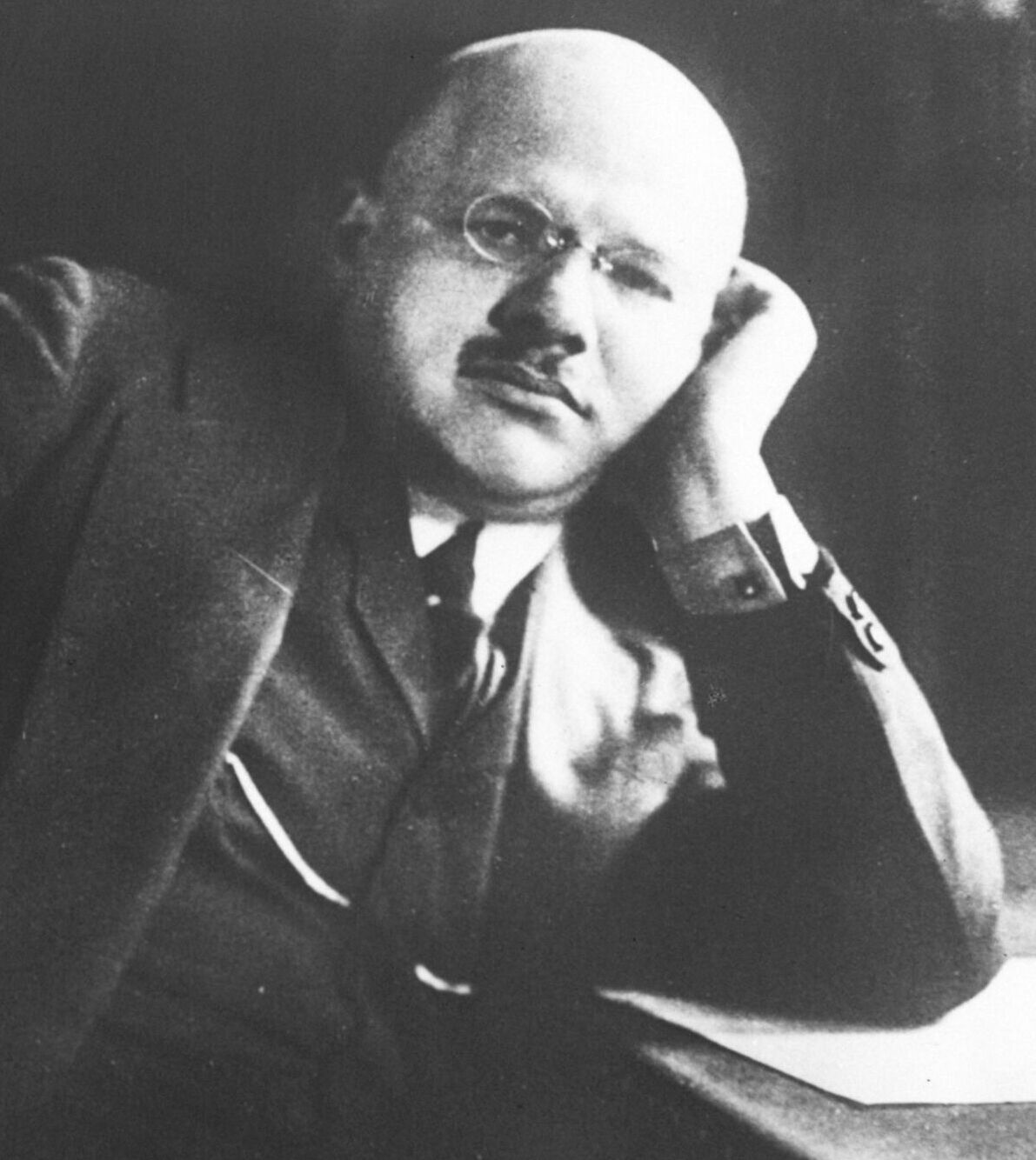
Leo Fall

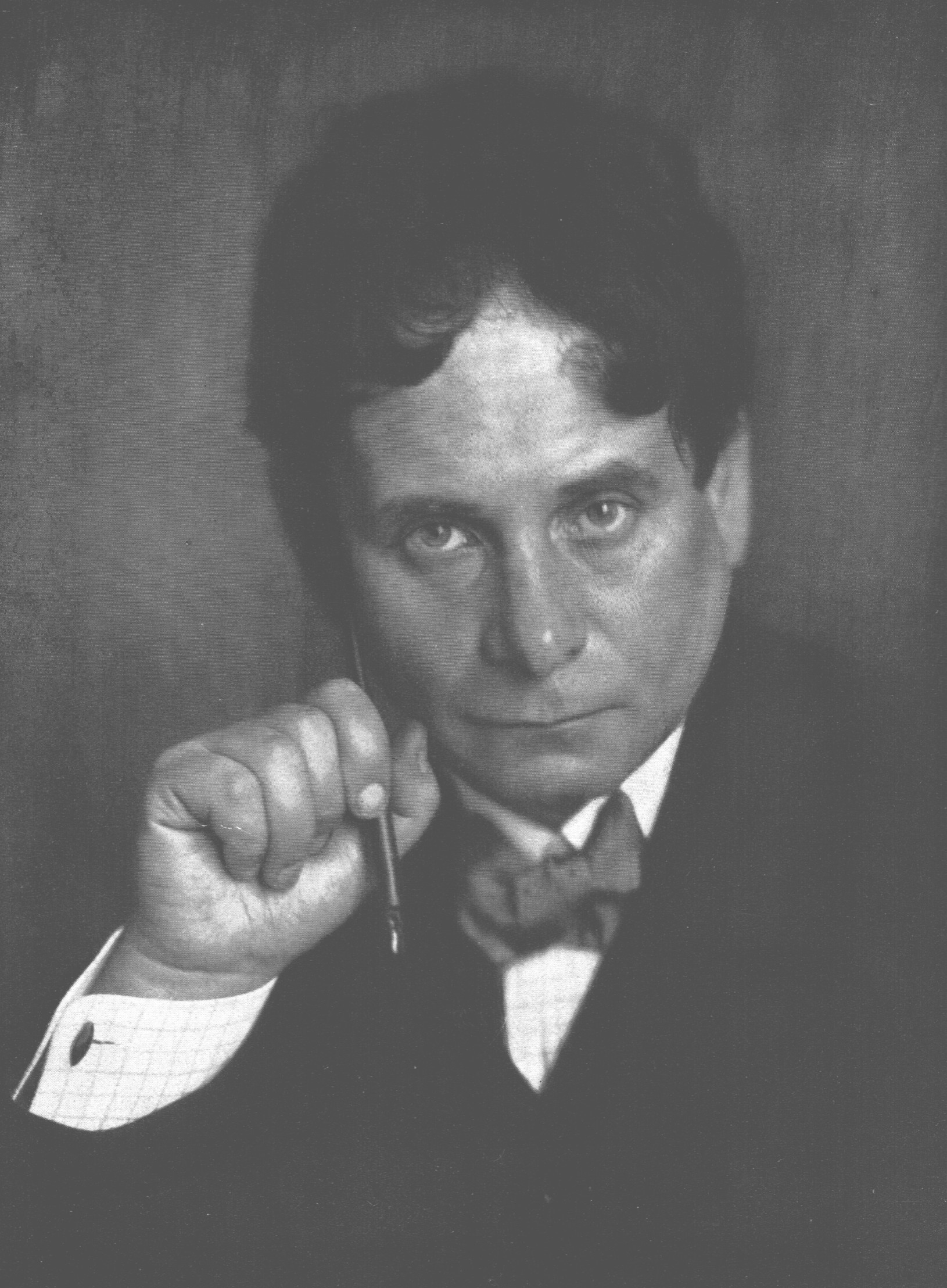
Maximilian Harden

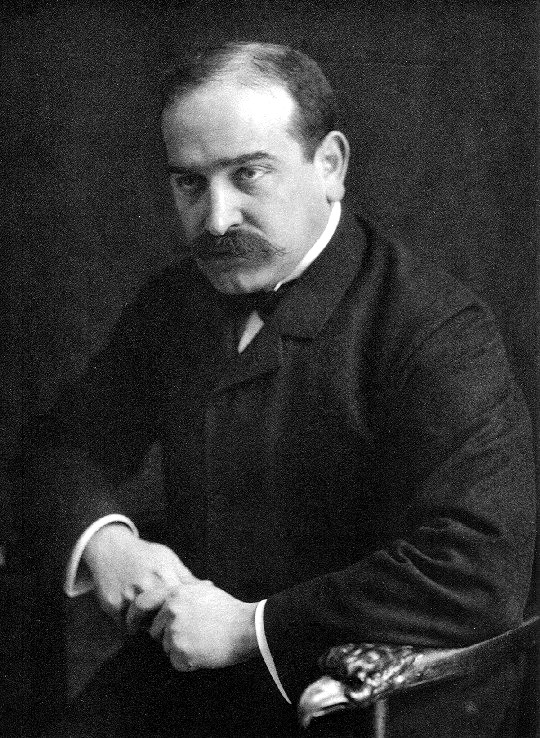
Max Warburg

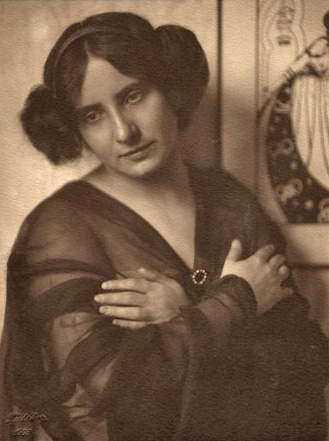
Olga Máté

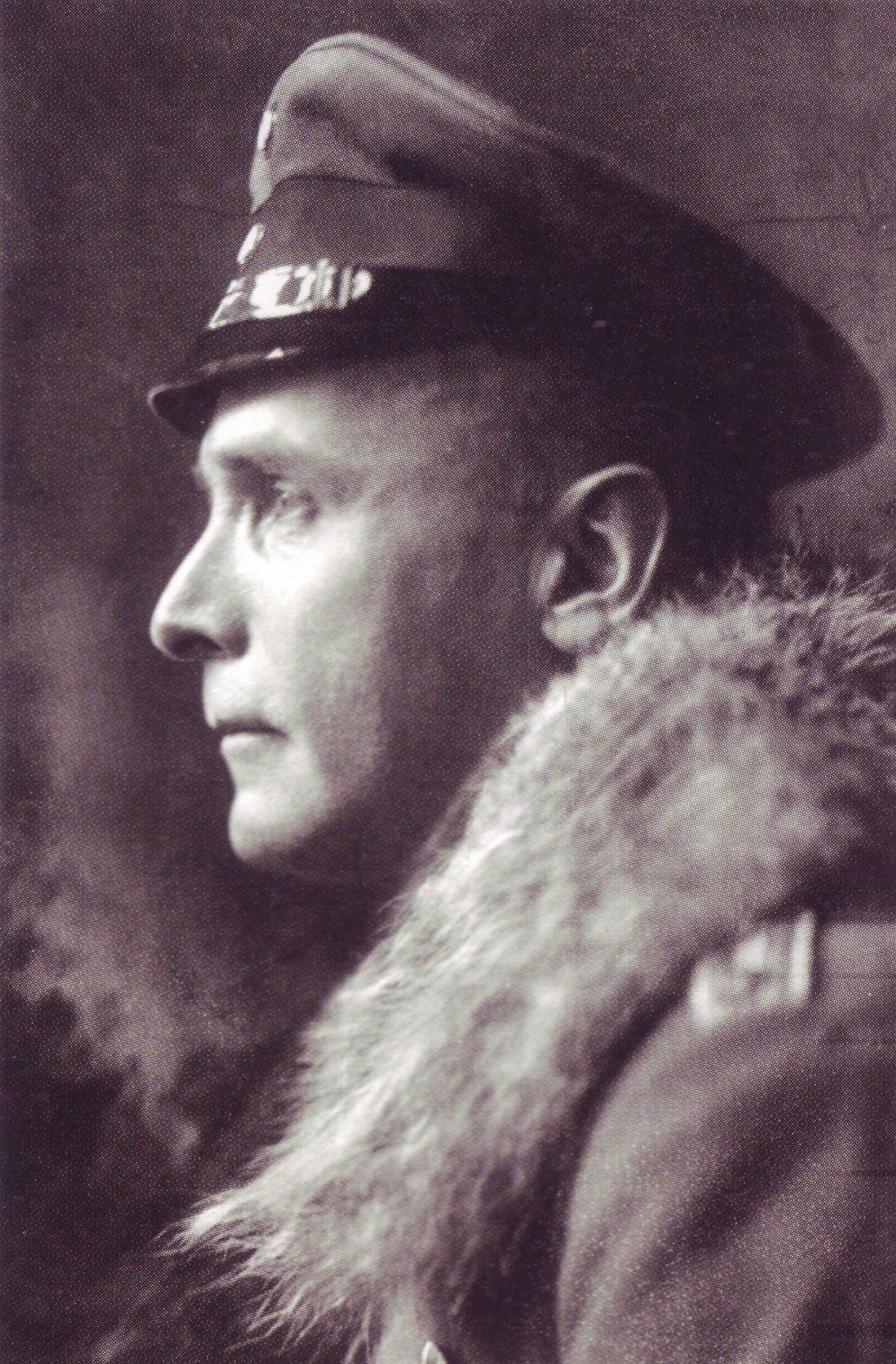
Harry Graf Kessler

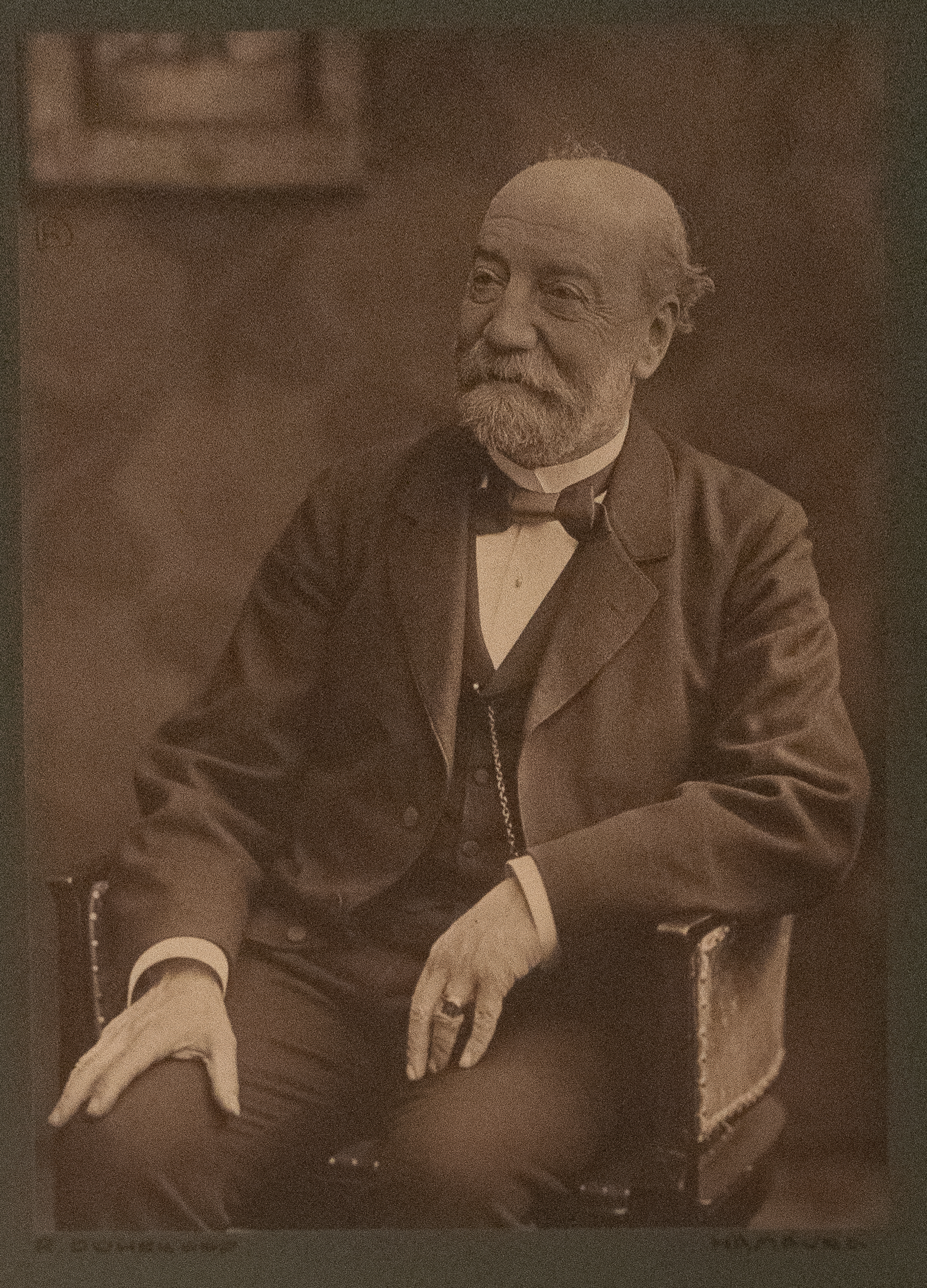
Gottlieb Daimler
