= Olga Máté =

Hungarian photographer

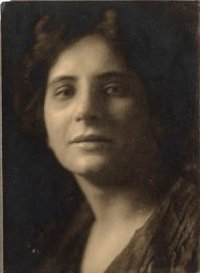
- 1910 portrait by Rudolf Dührkoop
- Born: Olga Mauthner; 1 January 1878; Szigetvár, Austro-Hungarian Empire
- Died: 5 April 1961 (aged 83); Budapest, Hungary
- Other names: Olga Zalai, Olga Máté Zalai
- Occupation: photographer

Olga Máté (1 January 1878 – 5 April 1961) was one of the first women Hungarian photographers, most known for her portraits. She was known for her lighting techniques and used lighted backgrounds to enhance her portraits and still life compositions. In 1912 she won a gold medal in Stuttgart at an international photography exhibit. Perhaps her best-known images are portraits she took of Mihály Babits and Margit Kaffka. She was also an early suffragist in Hungary and during the Hungarian White Terror assisted several intellectuals in their escapes.

== Biography ==
Olga Mauthner was born on 1 January 1878 in Szigetvár, during the Austro-Hungarian Empire to Hanna (née Spiegel) and Lőrinc Mauthner. There were two daughters and four sons in the family and changed their name from the German spelling to the Hungarian form, Máté. Originally Lőrinc Mauthner made his living as a merchant, while his wife did tailoring piecework, but when the family moved to Budapest, the father gave up his trade and opened a sewing factory. There were few business opportunities open to women but Máté studied in Budapest to become a photographer.

== Career ==
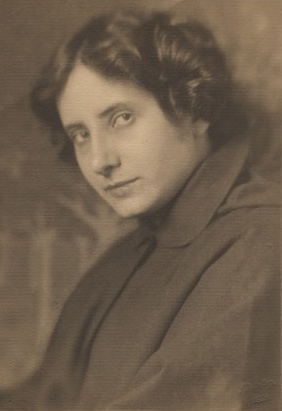
1908 portrait of Olga Máté by Rudolf Dührkoop

In 1899, Máté opened a studio in the central business district of Budapest at No. 21 Fő utca (Main Street). After working for several years to obtain sufficient capital in 1908, Máté went to Germany to study in Hamburg with Rudolf Dührkoop and with Nicola Perscheid, who at that time was in Berlin. She studied at least two years in Germany and began participating in exhibitions in 1910. Her photographs showed the influence of Dührkoop, as instead of formal settings, her subjects appeared more natural and were placed against lighted backgrounds, to focus the eye on the darker subject of the work. The following year, she exhibited in London at the London Salon of Photography.

Máté returned to Budapest and began working on a variety of subject matter including advertising, nudes, urban landscapes, but by far her most known works were portraits. In 1911 she began contributing to the journal A Fény (The Light). In that year's publication, about half of the photograph's submitted were by four Hungarian photographers, including Máté, Erzsi Gaiduschek, József Pécsi, and Frigyes Widder. In 1912, she opened a studio at No. 12 Veres Pálné utca, (a street in Budapest named after the educator and feminist Pálné Veres), and lived in an apartment above the studio, located on the building's sixth floor. In the fall of that year, Máté married the philosopher and academic Béla Zalai, a widower with two children. Their home became a meeting place for intellectuals to gather and discuss ideas.

Her circle of friends had always included artists, such as Lajos Kozma, Noémi Ferenczy, and Imre Kner and his family. After her marriage to Zalai, it expanded to include the "Sunday Circle", (Hungarian: Sonntagskreis) of Hungarian intelligentsia, like Béla Balázs, Paul Dienes, János Fogarasi, Arnold Hauser, Gyula Juhász, Dezső Kosztolányi, György Lukács, Karl Mannheim, and others. She took portraits of many in her circle, as well as society figures. Two of her best-known works were portraits of Mihály Babits and Margit Kaffka. Máté continued exhibiting, appearing at the International Photographers show in Stuttgart, where she won a gold medal with József Pécsi in 1912. In 1913, she was invited by Rosika Schwimmer to take photographs at the Seventh Conference of the International Woman Suffrage Alliance. She not only took photographs but was a supporter and organizer for the Hungarian feminist movement.

Máté exhibited in 1914 at the Professional Photographers Society of New York State and later that year, Zalai was drafted to serve in World War I. He was taken prisoner in December 1914 and died of typhus on 2 February 1915 in a POW camp in Omsk, Siberia. Máté struggled to raise his two children, but she cared for them and felt the later death of his daughter deeply. At the end of the war, with the collapse of Austria-Hungary, the country struggled against decline. A Fény, in which Máté had published since 1911 was closed. After the Hungarian Soviet Republic was defeated, György Lukács had been ordered by Béla Kun to remain behind with Ottó Korvin, when the rest of the leadership evacuated to Austria. Lukács and Korvin's mission was to clandestinely reorganize the communist movement, but the mission was impossible. Lukács was forced into hiding to avoid the communist purge and Máté hid him in her home. After Korvin was captured, Lukács fled to Austria. Máté also helped Jenő Hamburger flee along with others. These actions resulted in her censure by the courts.

During the 1920s and 1930s, her compositions were transformed, moving from the studio to outdoor settings with sepia tones replacing the sharp black and white contrasts of her earlier works. The subject matter also changed from the elite classes to working classes. In 1922, she did an exhibit for the Museum of Applied Arts and then in 1934 shared a studio with her student, Ferenc Haár. When Haàr moved to Paris in 1937, Máté closed the shop and the following year went to work in the studio of Marian Reismann.

Though one of Hungary's earliest professional women photographers, Máté died in obscurity. She died on 5 April 1961 in Budapest, Hungary and was buried in the Farkasréti Cemetery of Budapest.

== Legacy ==
In 2006, Csilla E. Csorba, director of the Petofi Museum of Literature, published a book Máté Olga fotóművész (Olga Máté Photographer) with Helikon Publishing in Budapest to recapture the history of Máté's contributions to photography. The Hungarian Museum Of Photography hosted an exhibit of her work in 2007. In 2009, Csorba took an exhibition of Hungarian women photographer's works on tour in New York City and Washington, D. C. for the year. It was the first time several of the artists' works had been seen in the United States. Máté's Still Life with Eggs and Mushrooms (1920) was praised for communicating beauty with everyday objects.
