= Leopold Katscher =

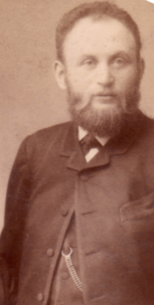

Leopold Katscher (1853–1939) was a Hungarian Jewish writer and peace activist. He was a strong influence on feminist and women's suffragist Rosika Schwimmer, who was his niece.

Katscher translated the works of Hippolyte Taine into German from 1877 until the early 20th century.
