= Second Conference of the International Woman Suffrage Alliance =

Feminist conference held in Berlin, Germany, June 1904

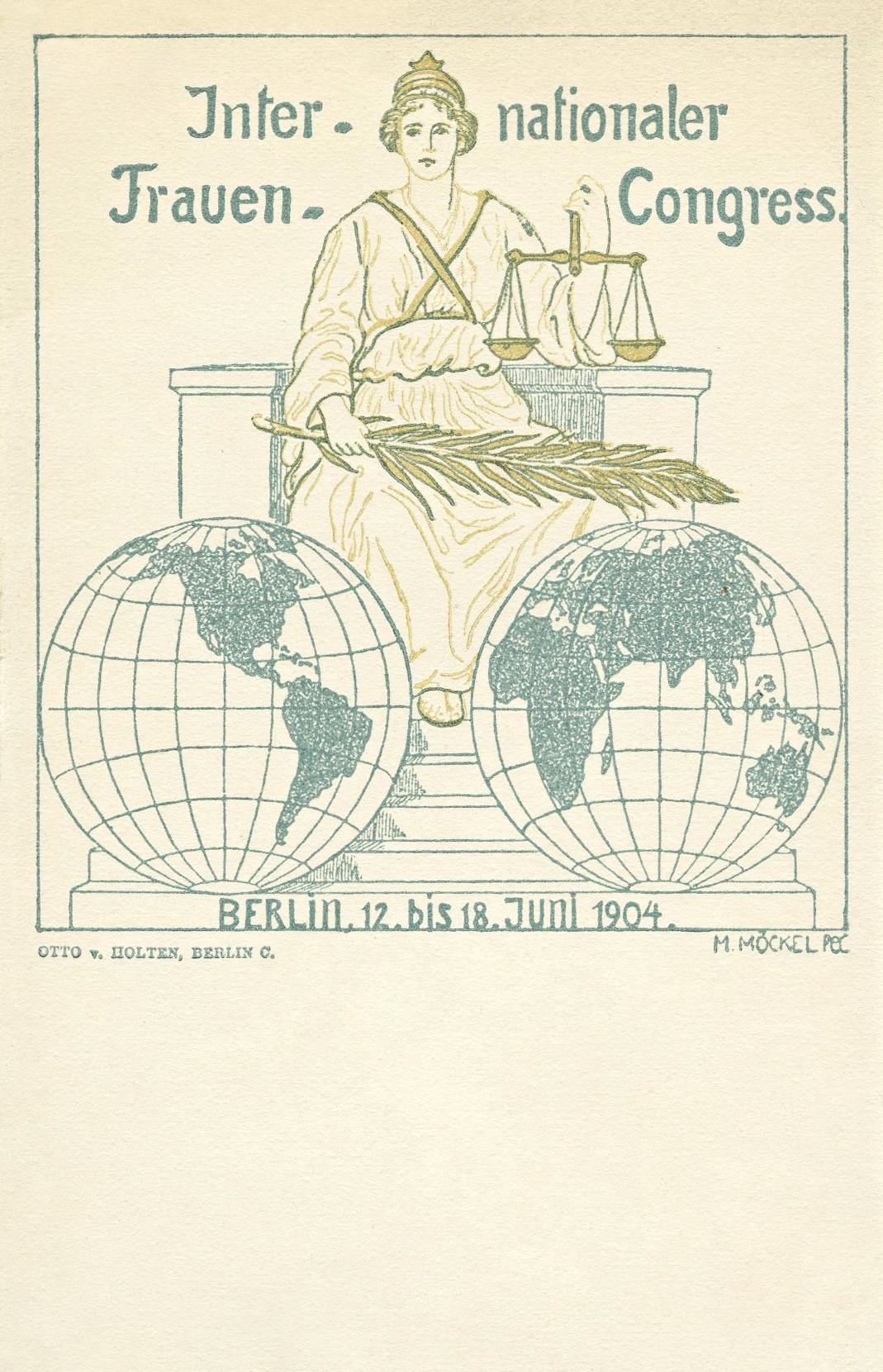
Postcard from the conference

Second Conference of the International Woman Suffrage Alliance was held in Berlin, Germany in June 1904. The main features of the second conference were the formation of "The International Woman Suffrage Alliance," and the adoption of the Declaration of Principles.

== Proceedings ==
The meeting was called to order on 3 June at the Prince Albert Hotel by American Susan B. Anthony. The welcoming address was made by Anita Augspurg of Germany and then Carrie Chapman Catt received the gavel from delegates of Wyoming. Appointments were made designating Germans Käthe Schirmacher as the official interpreter and Adelheid von Welczeck as assistant secretary; and Dutch delegate Aletta Jacobs and English delegate Edith Palliser as members of the credentials committee. Seven national woman suffrage associations were represented by regularly appointed delegates at the conference: Denmark, Germany, Gt. Britain, Norway, Sweden, the Netherlands and the United States. Visitors from Switzerland, New Zealand, Austria and Hungary were made members of the convention and were permitted to join freely in the discussion, until the constitution should be adopted.

When this had taken place, Anna Howard Shaw entered a motion that Anthony be declared the first member of the new association and Lucretia Longshore Blankenburg moved that Mary Stafford Anthony should be the second member. These motions unanimously carried and delegates then voted that all those who had attended the conference in Washington be invited as charter members. Thereafter, honorary new associates were accepted, including Austrian Friederike Mekler von Traunwies; Danes Anna Hude, Johanne Münter, and Charlotte Norrie; Hungarian Bertha Katscher; New Zealanders Wilhelmina Sherriff Bain and Isabel Napier; and Swiss Pauline Chaponnière-Chaix and Camille Vidart. A roll of the nations represented was called, and the delegates from Germany, Great Britain, Sweden, The Netherlands and the United States pledged affiliation with the new organization, now called the International Woman Suffrage Alliance. The name of Australia was also added to the list as the Secretary reported the desire of the suffragists there to enter the new organization as soon as it should be formed.

The delegates from Norway explained that while they did not doubt that the Norwegian suffrage association would wish to become a member of the Alliance, they did not feel authorized to pledge its affiliation until a conference could be had with the other members of their association. Some of the delegates from Denmark urged the impropriety of joining the Alliance since the Danish Woman Suffrage Society had only worked for municipal suffrage. The election of officers, which followed was therefore participated in by delegates from five countries only. Four of these were represented on the official board. That Sweden was not so represented must have been because her delegates proposed no candidate.

The executive officers were elected, including Susan B. Anthony, honorary president; Carrie Chapment Catt, president; Anita Augspurg, 1st vice president; Millicent Fawcett, 2nd vice president; Rachel Foster Avery, secretary; Käthe Schirmacher and Johanna Naber as assistant secretaries; and Sophia Rodger-Cunliffe, treasurer. Naber later resigned and was replaced by Martina Kramers.

Soon after the adjournment of the Alliance, some belated delegates from Norway arrived, and the expected conference took place. The report was at once made to the officers of the Alliance, that the Norwegian Suffrage Association wished to become a member. The majority of the delegates from Denmark having conferred together, they likewise expressed a desire to enter the Alliance, and pledged themselves that their association would declare itself for full suffrage. These two applications were presented to the officers yet remaining in Berlin, and the majority having voted to accept them, these two associations became members. Thus before leaving Berlin, every suffrage association in the world which could in any sense be called national except perhaps that of Canada, had entered into the Alliance, and the number of countries represented was eight.

== Notable people ==
- Lucretia Longshore Blankenburg
- Emy Gordon

== See also ==
- International Alliance of Women
