= Rosika Schwimmer =

Hungarian-born stateless peace activist (1877–1948)

- Schwimmer Rózsa
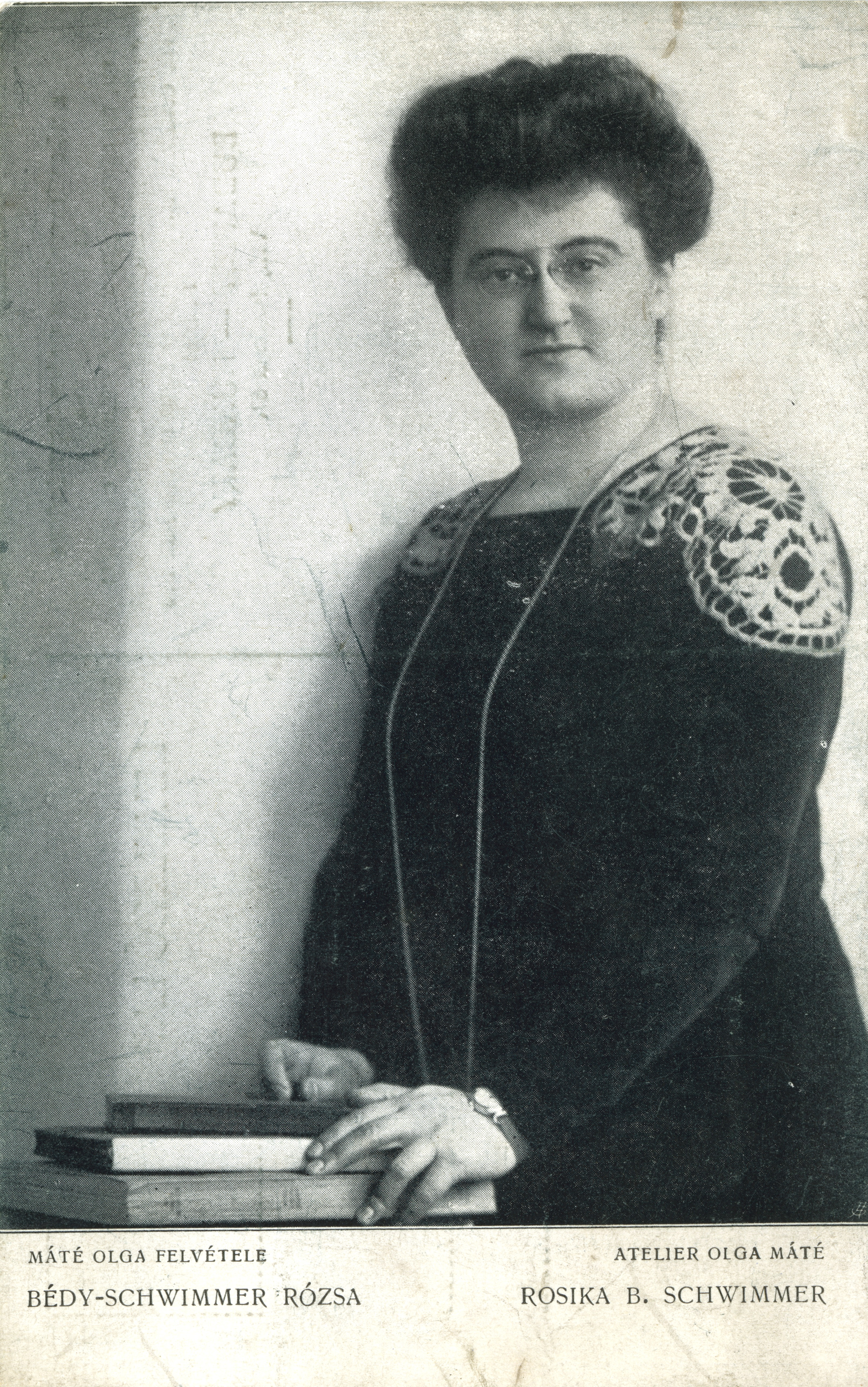
- Schwimmer, by fellow Hungarian suffragist, Olga Máté, circa 1914
- Born: 11 September 1877; Budapest, Kingdom of Hungary
- Died: 3 August 1948 (aged 70); New York City, U.S.
- Other names: Rózsa Bédi-Schwimmer, Rózsa Bédy-Schwimmer, Róza Schwimmer
- Occupations: Journalist, lecturer, activist
- Years active: 1895–1948
- Known for: Women's suffragist; Women's rights advocate; Pacifist
- Title: Co-founder of Campaign for World Government
- Relatives: Leopold Katscher (maternal uncle)

Rosika Schwimmer (Hungarian: Schwimmer Rózsa; 11 September 1877 – 3 August 1948) was a Hungarian-born pacifist, feminist, world federalist and women's suffragist. A co-founder of the Campaign for World Government with Lola Maverick Lloyd, her radical vision of world peace led to the creation of several world federalist movements and organizations. Sixty years after she first envisaged it, the movement she helped to create indeed took a leading role in the creation of the International Criminal Court, the first permanent international tribunal tasked with charging individuals with war crimes, crimes against humanity and genocide.

Schwimmer was born into a Jewish family in Budapest in 1877, she graduated from public school in 1891. An accomplished linguist, she spoke or read eight languages. In her early career, she had difficulty finding a job that paid a living wage and was sensitized by that experience to women's employment issues. Gathering data to provide statistics on working women, Schwimmer came into contact with members of the international women's suffrage movement and by 1904 became involved in the struggle. She co-founded the first national women's labor umbrella organization in Hungary and the Hungarian Feminist Association. She also assisted in organizing the Seventh Conference of the International Woman Suffrage Alliance, hosted in Budapest in 1913.

The following year, Schwimmer was hired as a press secretary of the International Woman Suffrage Alliance in London. When World War I broke out, she was branded an enemy alien and left Europe for the United States, where she spoke on suffrage and pacifism. She was one of the founders of the Woman's Peace Party and the organization which would become the Women's International League for Peace and Freedom.

In 1915, after attending the International Congress of Women in The Hague, she worked with other feminists to persuade foreign ministers in Europe to support the creation of a body to peacefully mediate world affairs and was instrumental in convincing Henry Ford to charter the Peace Ship. From 1916 to 1918, Schwimmer lived in Europe working on various plans to end the war. In 1918, with the establishment of the First Hungarian Republic, she was appointed the first woman diplomat, as Hungarian Minister Plenipotentiary to Switzerland. When the Republic was toppled by a coup d'état, she fled to the United States, renouncing her Hungarian citizenship.

Applying for naturalization, Schwimmer was rejected on the basis of her pacifism. The case was overturned on appeal in 1928, and the following year the appeal was overturned by the U.S. Supreme Court in the decision United States v. Schwimmer. For the remainder of her life, she remained stateless. Unable to work because of ill-health and a smear campaign, she was supported by loyal friends.

In 1935, Schwimmer and Mary Ritter Beard established the World Center for Women's Archives to create an educational reference for women's history and document the individual and organizational achievements of influential women. She was one of the first world federalists, proposing a world government in 1937. Nominated for the Nobel Peace Prize in 1948, she died before the committee decided not to award it that year. In 1952, naturalization laws in the United States were changed to allow for conscientious objection.

== Early years ==
Rózsa Schwimmer was born in Budapest, Austria-Hungary, on 11 September 1877 to Bertha (née Katscher) and Max Bernat Schwimmer. The eldest of three children, she was raised in an upper-middle-class Jewish family in Temesvár, Transylvania (today Timișoara, Romania). Her father was an agricultural merchant, involved in trading grain, horses and other products, who also ran an experimental farm. Her maternal uncle, Leopold Katscher, was a noted writer and peace activist, and also friend of Bertha von Suttner, who was a strong influence on Schwimmer. Translating Suttner's anti-war texts became her first political influence. She attended primary school briefly in Budapest and after the family moved to Transylvania was educated in a convent school. Graduating from the public school in 1891, she studied music and languages at the music school in Szabadka (today Subotica). Though she only attended eight grades, she spoke English, French, German, and Hungarian, and was able to read Dutch, Italian, Norwegian, and Swedish. In 1893 and 1894, she took evening classes at a business school until her father's bankruptcy forced the family to return to Budapest.

== Career ==
=== Early career and politicization ===
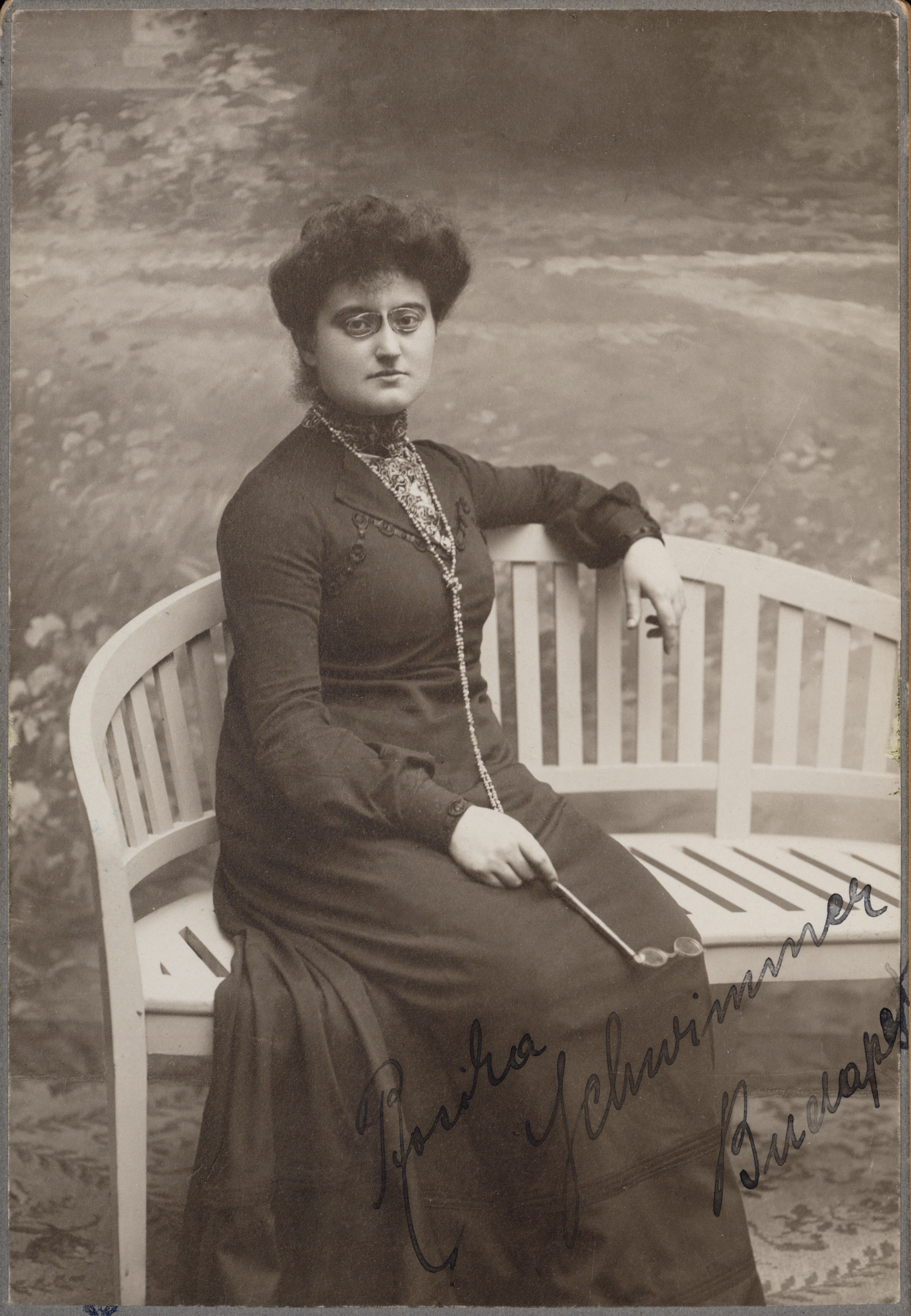
Rosika Schwimmer, 1890s

Schwimmer first worked as a governess, and then had several short-term jobs in Temesvár and Szabadka. In 1895, she found work as a bookkeeper and correspondent clerk. She began working for the Nőtisztviselők Országos Egyesülete (National Association of Women Office Workers) in 1897 and by 1901 had become president of the organization. Having experienced the difficulty of finding a job which paid a living wage, in an era when women were discouraged from seeking economic independence, Schwimmer chose to make a real difference for working women. Finding no acceptance or interest in addressing the issues women laborers encountered from national trade unions, she began collecting data to compile statistics. She wrote to the Department of Commerce to acquire data on women's employment and sought archived copies of Nemzeti Nőnevelés (National Women's Education), the most important journal of the era which analyzed the condition of women in education and labor. To compare the situation in Hungary with that of working women elsewhere, Schwimmer began writing to international feminist organizations to collect statistics on women's working conditions in other countries.

Through her correspondence to collect data, Schwimmer came in contact with influential figures of the international women's movement, like Aletta Jacobs, Marie Lang and Adelheid Popp, who encouraged her to found a women's organization that would unite various associations dealing with varied women's issues. When she lost her job at the National Association of Women Office Workers, Schwimmer began working as a journalist in late 1901. She wrote for Export Review and then was employed at Lloyd's News Agency, before becoming a regular contributor to international feminist magazines. She also worked as a translator, creating Hungarian versions of such works as Women and Economics by Charlotte Perkins Gilman. In 1903, she co-founded with Mariska Gárdos, the Magyarországi Munkásnő Egyesület (Hungarian Women Workers Association), the first national women's labor umbrella organization. The following year, as part of the press, she attended the inaugural conference of the International Woman Suffrage Alliance. She was asked to speak at the conference on labor conditions of industrial workers in Hungary. While there, she met many of the leading feminists of the international movement. Attracted to her charismatic personality, American suffragist Carrie Chapman Catt recruited Schwimmer to help in the efforts for women's suffrage. The two developed a deep friendship with Catt mentoring her younger companion.

Upon her return home, Schwimmer co-founded the Hungarian Feminist Association (Hungarian: Feministák Egyesülete (FE)) with Vilma Glücklich. They were joined by other prominent feminists like Eugénia Miskolczy Meller. The radical organization set out to work for gender equality in all aspects of women's lives, including education, employment, access to birth control, reform of laws governing married women's socioeconomic status, enfranchisement, and women's inheritance rights, as well as curtailing child labor. In 1907, to counteract the unfavorable press they received from the media at large, the Feminist Association founded the journal A Nő és a Társadalom (Women and Society), with Schwimmer as editor-in-chief. It published articles on careers, child care, domestic work, labor, legal issues and sexual abuse. She gained national prominence that year for a dispute with law professor and MP, Károly Kmety, who introduced a measure to implement stricter limits for women's admission to higher education. Kmety dubbed educated women as "female monsters", who aimed to destroy families. Schwimmer's rebuttal to his claims disclosed the fact that Kmety's wife had graduated from a normal school. Though she had won the argument, criticism of the Feminist Association continued.

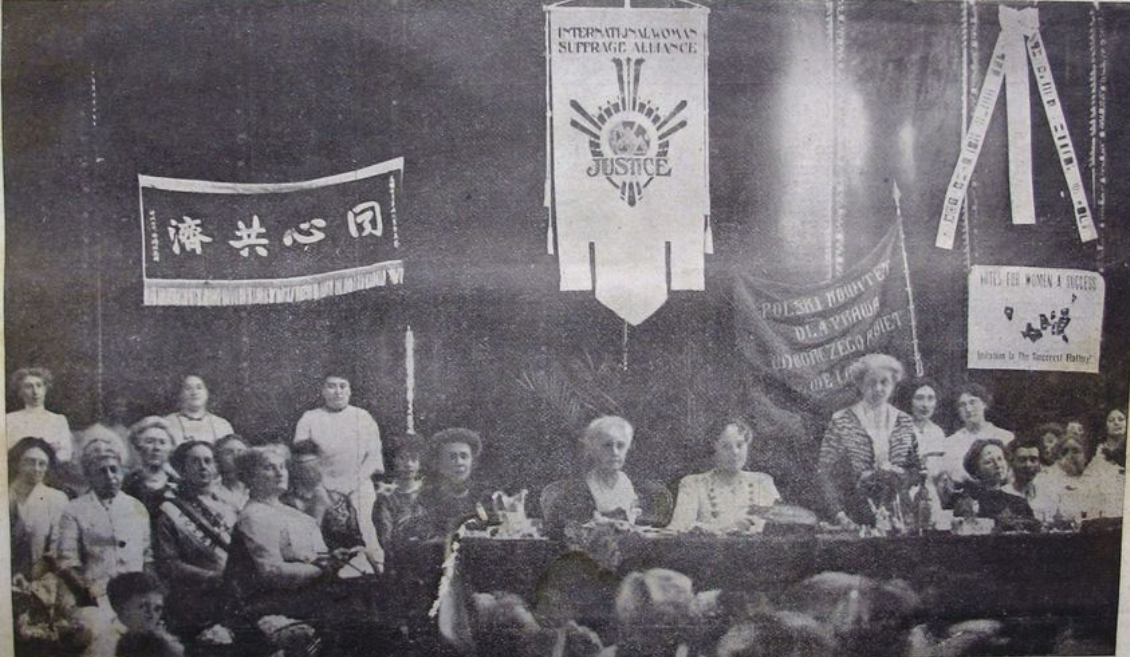
Presidential table during the Seventh congress of the International Woman Suffrage Alliance IWSA, Budapest, 1913

In 1911, she performed at the Stockholm Opera and other important venues in Stockholm. The same year, she married a journalist, Pál Bédy and took his name (Bédy-Schwimmer) but he either died in 1912, or they divorced in 1913. (Note: There is evidence to support that even though numerous sources confirm the dates of her marriage and dissolution, it may be incorrect. Some of her Hungarian writing indicates B.-Schwimmer from as early as 1907. In the 1940 census, Schwimmer clearly indicates she is divorced, rather than widowed.) After their breakup she removed his surname and returned to using Schwimmer, keeping the fact that she had ever been married a life-long secret.

In 1913, she helped the Feminist Association organize the Seventh Conference of the International Woman Suffrage Alliance which ran from 15 to 21 June in Budapest. Garnering support from both the national and city government, the convention was the first such large-scale event to be held in Austria-Hungary, attracting around 3,000 international delegates. Schwimmer arranged for university students to provide translation services and presented an update on the progress of suffrage in Hungary. Trips were also organized to Debrecen, Nagyvárad (today Oradea) and Szeged, as well as smaller villages, so that the feminists could see more of the country. The behavior of the feminists at the conference significantly changed the stereotypes that had previously been ascribed to women's rights advocates. After the close of the conference, Schwimmer changed the name of the Feminist Association's journal to A Nő (The Woman). In August 1913, she attended the Universal Peace Congress in The Hague, which deepened her interest in pacifism.

By this time, Schwimmer had traveled widely throughout Europe on lecture tours. An extrovert and experienced journalist, she knew how to appeal to her audience. Known for her comedic wit and clever satire, she was able to convince men to support women's rights and caused women to laugh at men using pointed attacks laced with humor. Thanks to her strong, energetic personality, which some described as stubborn, she often went beyond the limitations women were expected to observe. She was an "uncompromising pacifist", a humanist, and an atheist. With her Jewish heritage and foreign status, she often experienced anti-Semitic and xenophobic attacks. She smoked and drank wine, which was unusual at the time, and wore loose-fitting, corsetless dresses with her trademark pince-nez glasses. Of stocky build, she typically wore her black, frizzy hair in a bun at the nape of her neck. She described herself as a "very, very radical feminist" and was known to elicit either love or hate from others—"frequently people did both at different times".

=== Internationalism ===
Schwimmer's international contacts resulted in an invitation for her to become the press secretary of the International Woman Suffrage Alliance, leading her to move to London for the job. She also worked as a correspondent of various European newspapers. When World War I broke out, she could not return home and began to agitate for the end of hostilities. She resigned from her post with the Suffrage Alliance, fearing her nationality would cause problems for the women's movement and her own ability to continue pressing for peace. Branded as an enemy alien in 1914, she left Britain to tour the United States and press for an end to the war. Schwimmer spoke in 22 different states, urging women to press for diplomatic mediation of the European conflict. She met with President Woodrow Wilson and Secretary of State William Jennings Bryan, but was unsuccessful in her attempts to organize a neutral conference to bring both sides of the conflict together.

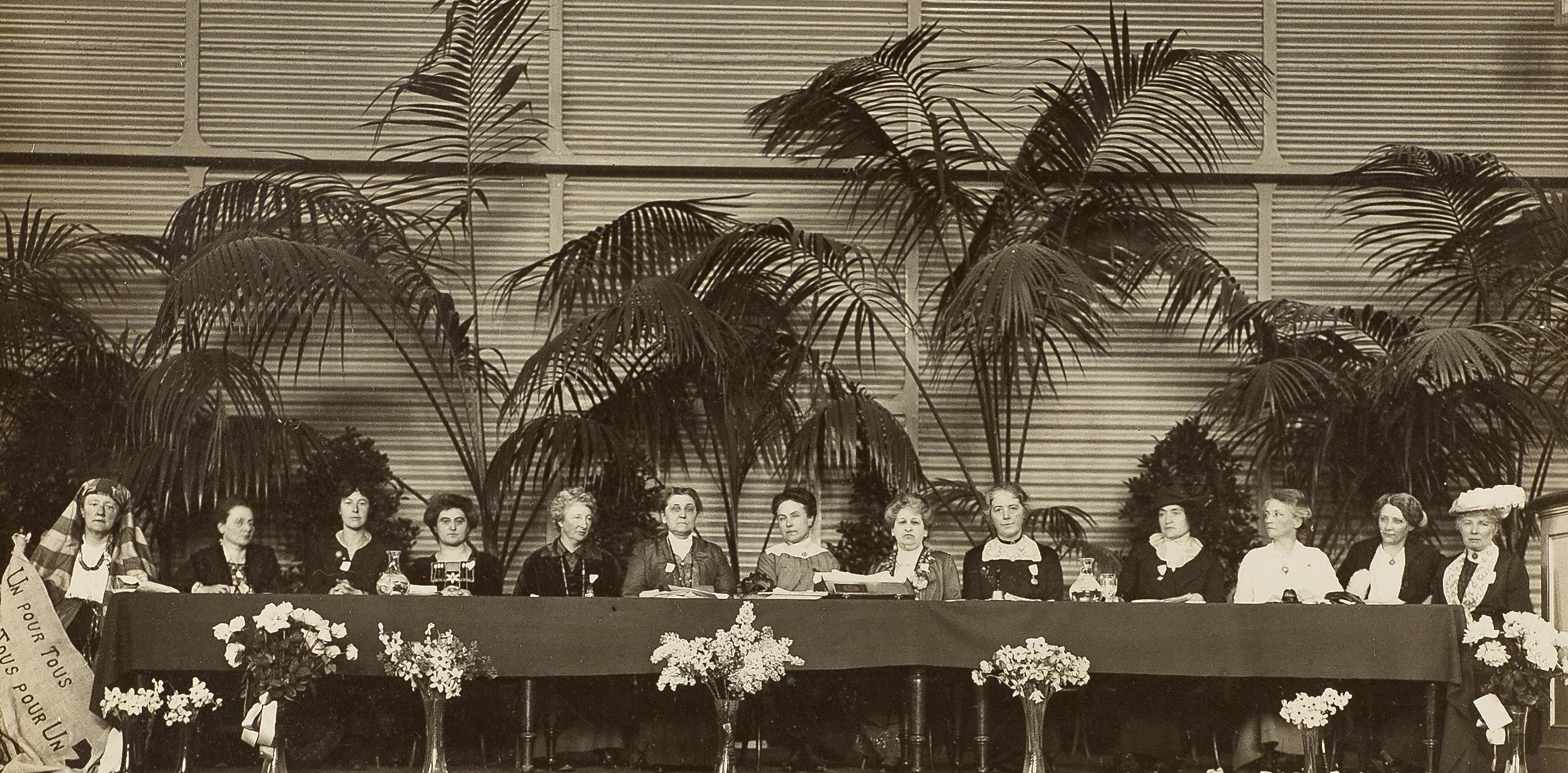
International Congress of Women in 1915. left to right:1. Lucy Thoumaian - Armenia, 2. Leopoldine Kulka, 3. Laura Hughes - Canada, 4. Rosika Schwimmer - Hungary, 5. Anika Augspurg - Germany, 6. Jane Addams - USA, 7. Eugenie Hanner, 8. Aletta Jacobs - Netherlands, 9. Chrystal Macmillan - UK, 10. Rosa Genoni - Italy, 11. Anna Kleman - Sweden, 12. Thora Daugaard - Denmark, 13. Louise Keilhau - Norway

Schwimmer took part in the formation of the Woman's Peace Party in 1915, becoming a secretary of the organization. Because of the war, the biennial conference of the International Woman Suffrage Alliance was postponed. Chrystal Macmillan proposed that suffragists should hold a conference to discuss international peace principles and Aletta Jacobs suggested that the Netherlands, as a neutral nation, could host the event. Schwimmer was asked to secure Catt as the chair of the conference but, unable to convince her, she approached social reformer, Jane Addams, who agreed to serve as conference chair. At the International Congress of Women, held in The Hague from 28 April, Schwimmer and Julia Grace Wales, a Canadian academic, proposed a "continuous conference of neutrals" between governments be formed to mediate conflicts and restore peace. During the conference the International Committee of Women for Permanent Peace was established, which would become the Women's International League for Peace and Freedom (WILPF). Schwimmer was selected as one of its board members.

After the conference closed on 3 May 1915, Schwimmer, Addams and Jacobs, along with Macmillan, Emily Greene Balch, Mien van Wulfften Palthe and others, formed two delegations of women who met with European heads of state over the next several months. The women secured agreement from reluctant foreign ministers, who overall felt that a mediating body would be ineffective. In spite of their hesitancy, the ministers agreed to participate, or at least not impede, the creation of a neutral assembly, if other nations agreed and if U.S. President Woodrow Wilson would initiate its establishment. In the midst of the war, Wilson refused. By the time Schwimmer returned from Europe in the fall, sentiment had changed in the United States and many feminists believed that pacifism would hurt the cause for suffrage. Disagreeing with them, Schwimmer did not think the struggle for women's rights should focus solely on attaining suffrage. She strongly believed broader changes were needed and women's voices were crucial for ending violence against humanity. She also felt that neither Catt nor Addams worked hard enough to secure the broad support needed for peace work from reform-minded women. Determined to continue pressing for a mediation conference, she decided that if politicians and feminists would not act, it would fall on individuals to work to end the war.

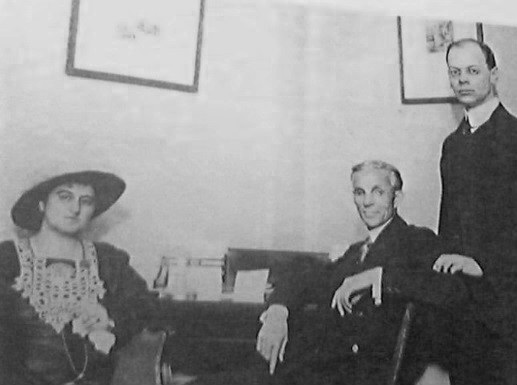
Schwimmer, Ford and Louis P. Lochner aboard the Peace Ship Oskar II

Henry Ford, the automobile magnate, had pledged $10 million towards peace initiatives which would result in action to end the war. Teacher Rebecca Shelley and poet Angela Morgan became convinced that Ford and Schwimmer should meet. They arranged a series of demonstrations and public meetings in Detroit hoping that publicity would facilitate a meeting. When it did not have the desired effect, Shelley met with the editor of the Detroit Journal and a reporter, Ralph Yonker, who was a favorite of Ford, set up an interview for Schwimmer. Henry Ford became convinced by Schwimmer's arguments and decided to finance the peace boat. Within three weeks, in early December, she set sail aboard a Peace Ship to Stockholm, chartered by Ford, with him and other pacifists. The Oskar II arrived in Christiania, Norway on 18 December.

Without strong leadership from Ford, the pacifists on board jockeyed for power positions, and Schwimmer was resented for having been entrusted with the international correspondence from heads of state. Confronted with ridicule and hostility by the press, and in Schwimmer's case suspicion because of her Hungarian roots, Ford returned to the United States abandoning the peace mission to the Women's International Peace Association on 24 December. In January 1916 the Neutral Conference for Continuous Mediation began without Ford. Disappointed with Ford's efforts, Schwimmer persevered for several months, but exhaustion and a heart condition led her to resign and withdraw from the mission in March 1916. Failure to secure the backing of the peace mission from the International Committee of Women for Permanent Peace and hurt by both Addams and Jacobs lack of support, she resigned from the committee. She was unable to return to the United States until August and stayed only about a month before she was back in Sweden, suffering from illness.

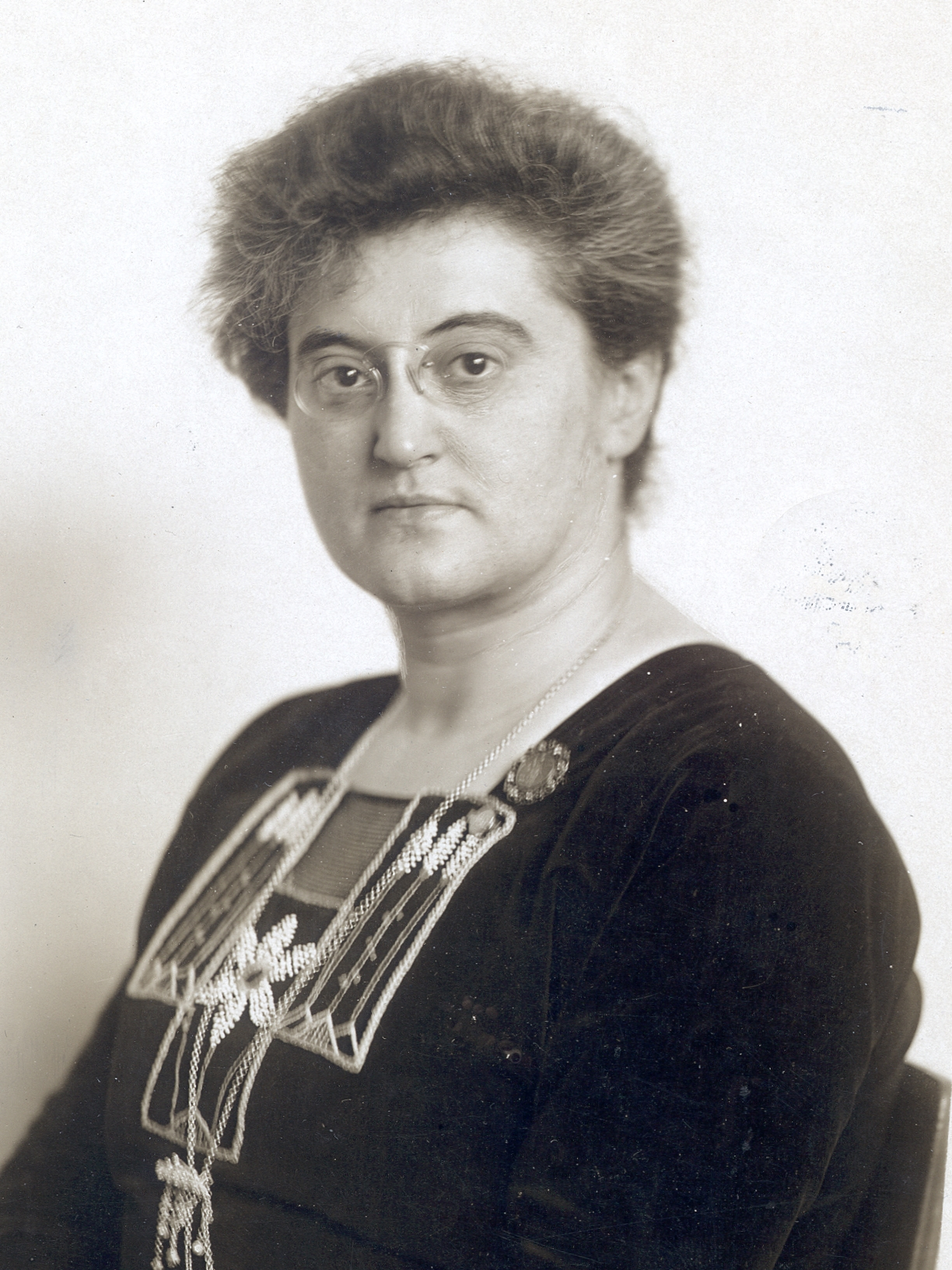
Schwimmer, 1914

According to Beth S. Wenger, chair of the history department at the University of Pennsylvania, the debacle of the Peace Ship "signaled the beginning of a smear campaign against [Schwimmer] and the eventual termination of her public career". Though Henry Ford's anti-Semitic beliefs that German-Jewish bankers had caused the war predated his involvement with Schwimmer, she was portrayed in the American press as the reason for his prejudices. She was also accused of swindling Ford out of money, being a German spy, and a Bolshevik agent, though she was awarded $17,000 in a libel suit against the New York Commercial Advertiser for making those charges. Until the end of the war she remained in Europe, returning to Hungary in 1918. Having gained the country's independence, Mihály Károlyi was selected as the new Hungarian prime minister. He appointed Schwimmer as the ambassador to Switzerland, making her one of the world's first female ambassadors. Károlyi also tabled a bill guaranteeing women's suffrage for literate women over the age of 24, which was passed by the Parliament later that year. In February 1919, in Bern, Schwimmer organized a peace conference for the International Committee of Women for Permanent Peace; however, she was recalled from her post days before the communist coup d'état in March. Barred from leaving Hungary, Schwimmer was unable to attend the Zurich Peace Conference in May. Béla Kun's communist government was soon overthrown by another coup d'état placing István Friedrich as the head of the government. Friedrich's inadequacy led Admiral Miklós Horthy's forces to try to establish order by implementing a reign of White Terror by cleansing the country of Jews and communists. In 1920, Schwimmer fled to Vienna where she lived as a refugee, financially supported by her friend Lola Maverick Lloyd, until she secured permission to emigrate to the United States in 1921.

=== Statelessness ===
Schwimmer renounced her Hungarian citizenship and arrived in the United States on 26 August 1921, first settling in Winnetka, Illinois, near Chicago with Lloyd. She had every intention of resuming her journalistic and lecturing career, but soon found she was blacklisted. In 1919, New York State had launched the Lusk Investigation to examine the activities of radical people and organizations liable to threaten the nation's security. They included educators, journalists, reform organizations and religious institutions. Feminists and pacifists were branded as subversives; in particular, the women involved in the creation of the Women's International League for Peace and Freedom were accused of a lack of loyalty because of their international focus and for leaning toward communism. As Schwimmer was one of the founders, she was listed as a dangerous element in the Lusk Report. Military officials and right-wing women's organizations, such as the Daughters of the American Revolution, joined in the Red Scare tactics to focus suspicion on the activities of pacifists and suffragists.

Catt and Addams both drew criticism from anti-radical groups and because of her link to them, Schwimmer, and those who associated with her, became targets for those seeking to attack leaders in the feminist movement. Schwimmer was accused of having prevented the United States from preparing sooner for the war, was called a spy, and her peace initiatives were twisted from being humanitarian missions into strategic plots to aid the Germans and their allies. Other distortions accused her of having been a diplomat in Kun's brief communist regime and a member of an international Jewish conspiracy. To prevent the attacks leveled at Schwimmer from harming the campaign for suffrage, Catt distanced herself, causing her pain and a feeling of abandonment. The Jewish community which had welcomed her before the war largely blamed Schwimmer for Ford's anti-Semitic campaign published between 1920 and 1922 in The Dearborn Independent, though Ford "never indicated that Schwimmer played any such role".

In 1924, Schwimmer applied for naturalization as a U.S. citizen. When she completed the questionnaire, she left both the question about whether she had registered for the draft and whether she would take up arms in defense of the country blank, assuming they did not apply to women. After review, her file was returned to the Chicago office with a directive for Schwimmer to answer if she would bear arms. Against the advice of Fred Schlotfeldt, the District Director of Naturalization, Schwimmer, believing that no woman would be compelled to fight in the United States and that honesty was required in completing the form, answered that she would not personally take up arms. Two years later, her second interview was called and she explained in detail that defending the country did not necessarily require her physical action, but instead could be a verbal or written defense of principles. She was also questioned about her atheism, her views of nationalism, and her commitment to pacifism. Schwimmer responded that faith was a personal choice and in line with the idea of separation of church and state. She also stated that nationalism was a choice, that she had given up her Hungarian citizenship to pursue U.S. naturalization, and she reiterated that she would not compromise her pacifism.

After the interview, Schlotfeldt advised the United States District Court for the Northern District of Illinois that Schwimmer qualified for citizenship, but that she might have mental reservations about taking an oath of allegiance. Her case was called on 13 October 1927 with Judge George A. Carpenter presiding. The pivotal question in her hearing was asked by Carpenter:

Q [Carpenter]. If you were called to the service, and the kind of work that women usually can perform better than the men can—say as a nurse or as someone to give cheer to the soldiers—and you were at some place in a war, which I hope will never come, and you saw someone coming in the headquarters or the barracks, wherever it was, with a pistol in his hand to shoot the back of an officer of our country, and you had a pistol handy by, would you kill him?

A [Schwimmer]. No I would not.

— Flowers & Lahutsky 1990, p. 348

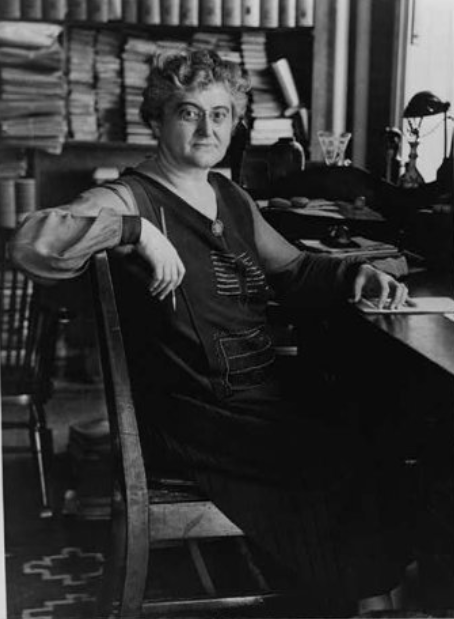
Schwimmer, soon after she was denied citizenship in 1927

Her application was denied solely on the basis that Schwimmer refused to take up arms in defense of the country. On the advice of her attorneys and Judge Carpenter, she immediately appealed the decision. Notoriety and negative publicity made it difficult for her to earn a living or support her mother and sister, who lived with her. She spent most of her remaining life fighting slander against her. After Fred Marvin, a Republican and anti-radical who was editor of the New York Daily Commercial, accused her of being a German spy and a Bolshevik agent, she sued and received $17,000 in damages in July 1928. The following day, her case in the United States Court of Appeals for the Seventh Circuit on her denial of citizenship was unanimously overturned, concluding that "women are considered incapable of bearing arms" and thus could not be forced under the law to do so.

Acting Secretary of Labor, Robe Carl White, Attorney General John G. Sargent, and the Acting Solicitor General Oscar Raymond Luhring were asked to review the decision for the Commissioner of Naturalization to determine if a petition for review should be sent to the US Supreme Court. Believing that Schwimmer's influence as a writer and public speaker could sway others to refuse to perform military service, Luhring and Sargent examined the court records, but were unable to find any point of law on which to base a review. Urged by White to reconsider the opinion, Sargent replied that Schwimmer appeared to be a fanatical idealist of intelligence and ability and that there was no evidence that had been presented in court to substantiate that she had a sinister character. Nonetheless, he prepared the petition for certiorari, which White clearly wanted. In a 6 to 3 decision of the United States v. Schwimmer, handed down on 27 May 1929, Associate Justice Pierce Butler determined that pacifists should not be allowed to become citizens. In a dissenting opinion, Associate Justice Oliver Wendell Holmes Jr. put forth that free thought was a tenet of the Constitution and had no bearing on whether someone should be admitted to or live in the country. He also pointed out that as a woman over 50, even had she wanted to take up arms, she would not be allowed to do so.

=== Later life ===
Having been denied citizenship, Schwimmer became stateless and remained so throughout the remainder of her life. She proposed that the Women's International League for Peace and Freedom host a conference to address the issue of a lack of nationality. The event was held in Geneva in 1930 and she drafted a plan for world citizens to be internationally recognized. Because of poor health, which included complications from diabetes, and an inability to work, she was supported by loyal friends. In the early 1930s, she moved to New York City, where she lived with her sister, Franciska, a pianist, and her secretary, Edith Wynner. In 1935, she formed the World Center for Women's Archives with Mary Ritter Beard. The purpose of the archive was to document the individual and organizational achievements of influential women as an educational reference for women to study the history other women. Schwimmer received an honorary World Peace Prize in 1937, organized by Catt, Albert Einstein, Sylvia Pankhurst, Romain Rolland, Margaret Sanger, and others, which provided her with a prize of $7,000.

Also in 1937, Schwimmer formed the Campaign for World Government with Lloyd, the first World Federalist organization of the 20th century. The purpose of the organization was to establish world governance with a constitution, elected representation, a supranational legal system to resolve conflicts between nations, and an International Criminal Court to address human rights issues. Schwimmer was one of the pioneers who backed creation of the International Court of Justice as a means to provide equal participation and protection for all people regardless of ethnicity, race, or gender. Between 1938 and 1945, Schwimmer campaigned to help European colleagues, such as Helene Stöcker, escape from Nazi Germany. In 1946, United States v. Schwimmer was overturned in Girouard v. United States, which determined that the Supreme Court had used an incorrect rule of law in Schwimmer, as well as in the cases United States v. Macintosh, 283 U.S. 605 (1931) and United States v. Bland, 283 U.S. 636 (1931). In 1948 she was nominated for the Nobel Peace Prize but had little chance of obtaining it, in spite of support from backers in Britain, France, Hungary, Italy, Sweden, and the United States. No prize was given that year, the Nobel Committee concluding that "no one living deserved it", an allusion widely considered to be referring to the death of the Mahatma Gandhi.

== Death and legacy ==
Rosika Schwimmer died of pneumonia on 3 August 1948 in New York City. She was buried the following day at Ferncliff Cemetery. She is remembered as one of the primary spokespersons for Hungarian women in the era before World War I and as the co-founder of the Hungarian suffrage movement. Schwimmer's unpopularity during her lifetime discouraged scholarship. Historians in the 21st century have begun to analyze her life and reassess her import. After the World Centre for Women's Archives closed in 1940, Schwimmer's papers have been held in various archives including the Benson Ford Research Center in Dearborn, Michigan, Hoover Institution Archives at Stanford University, the Peace Collection at Swarthmore College, and in the Schwimmer-Lloyd Collection of the New York Public Library.

Schwimmer's story illustrates the profound changes that occurred in the United States in the interwar period. Although she was never granted American citizenship, her life paralleled shifts in American society and values. Upon her arrival in the United States there was optimism that World War I could end quickly. When she returned in 1921, her pacifism was seen as a sign of disloyalty. A rising conservatism affected feminist groups and transformed them.

Although the Peace Ship mission was largely seen as a failure, it changed the war press coverage in Europe, which to that point had been highly censored. The conference that was established in Stockholm in February 1916 served as a clearinghouse for discussing the war and how to end it. It also helped neutral nations avoid bowing to the pressure to enter the war. Her citizenship case became the basis for a lengthy campaign to change the naturalization laws to recognize that philosophical or religious belief were inadequate reasons for denial of citizenship. In 1952, the law was finally changed to allow conscientious objectors to take an oath that they agree to serve in a non-combatant capacity.

== See also ==
- List of peace activists

== Selected works ==
- Schwimmer, Rosika (1905). Ehe-Ideale und Ideal-Ehen: Aeusserungen moderner Frauen [Marriage Ideals and Ideal Marriages: Expressions of Modern Women] (in German). Berlin: Continent. OCLC 246799896.
- B.-Schwimmer, Rózsa (1907). A magyar nőmozgalom régi dokumentumai [Old Documents of the Hungarian Women's Movement] (PDF) (in Hungarian). Budapest.
- Schwimmer, Rosika (1907). Zentralhaushaltung [Central Housekeeping] (in German). Leipzig: Felix Dietrich. OCLC 889838107.
- Schwimmer, Rosika (1908). Ohne Frauen kein allgemeines Wahlrecht [Without Women No Universal Suffrage] (in German). Berlin: Druck von W. & S. Loewenthal. OCLC 779072019. – via ASP: Women and Social Movements (subscription required)
- Schwimmer, Rosika (1909). Staatlicher Kinderschutz in Ungarn [State Child Protection in Hungary] (in German). Leipzig: Felix Dietrich. OCLC 253372884.
- Schwimmer, Rosika; Pogány, Willy (illustrator) (1928). Tisza Tales (1st ed.). Garden City, New York: Doubleday Doran. OCLC 2791128.
- Schwimmer, Rosika (1941). Union Now for Peace Or War?: The Danger in the Plan of Clarence Streit (3rd printing ed.). Chicago, Illinois: Campaign for World Government. OCLC 68427548.
- Lloyd, Lola Maverick; Schwimmer, Rosika (1942). Chaos, War, or a New World Order: What We Must Do to Establish the All-inclusive, Non-military, Democratic Federation of Nations (2nd revision, 3rd printing ed.). Chicago, Illinois: Campaign for World Government. OCLC 827302661. – via ASP: Women and Social Movements (subscription required)
