= Vilma Glücklich =

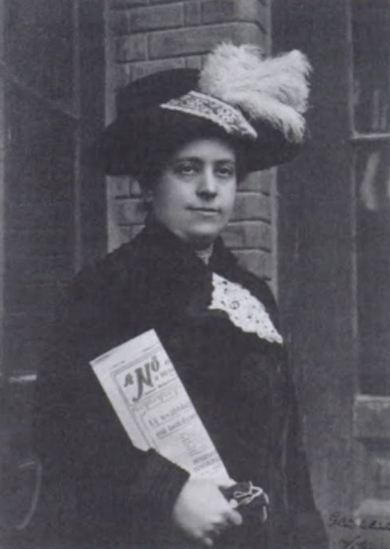
Glücklich holding the journal of Feministák Egyesülete

Vilma Glücklich (1872–1927), was a Hungarian educational reformer, pacifist and women's rights activist. In 1896, she became the first woman in Hungary to receive a degree from the Faculty of Philosophy in the Budapest State University, after having been the first woman admitted to a Hungarian university. Alongside Rosika Schwimmer, she is counted as one of the two leading figures in the Hungarian Women's Movement in late 19th-century and early 20th-century. Elected a member of the presidential committee of the National Association of Female Employees (1902), co-founder of the Hungarian Feminist Association (Feministák Egyesülete) or HFA (1904), co-founder of the Women's International League for peace and Freedom (1915), member of the Supervision Committee of the Municipal administration of Budapest (1918), co-founder secretary general of the Women's International League for Peace and Freedom (1924–1926).

Vilma Glücklich was the first woman to attend the University in Budapest and Hungary, and the first to graduate from one in 1896. She worked as a teacher. From 1902, she was active in trade union work, and soon after in the women's movement. In 1913, she and Rosika Schwimmer hosted the 7th congress of the International Alliance for Women Suffrage in Budapest.

During World War I, she was active in the pacifist movement. She became one of two females active in the democratic regime in 1918. Because of this, she was deprived of her work and exiled in 1921, after which she emigrated to Switzerland.

== See also ==
- List of peace activists
