= Hiromura Embankment =

- 広村堤防 (Japanese)
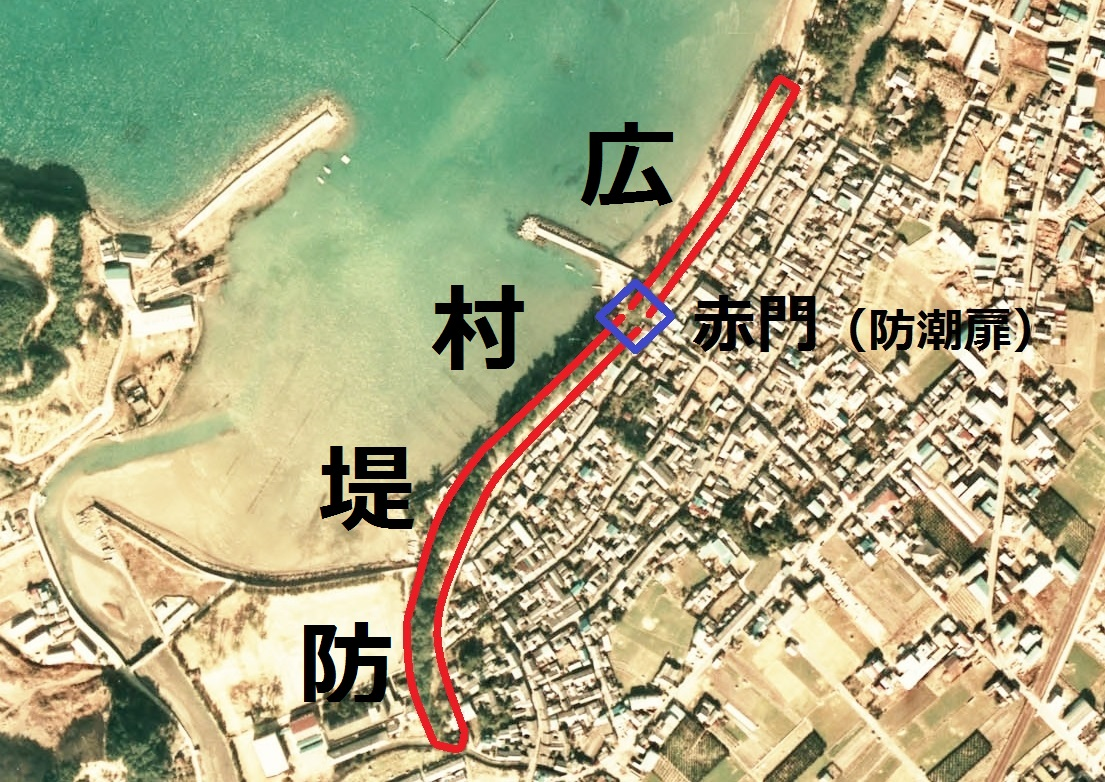
- Aerial view of the Hiromura Embankment

- Hiromura Embankment Hiromura Embankment (Japan)
- 34°1′40″N 135°10′19″E
- Periods: Edo period
- Location: Hirogawa, Wakayama, Japan
- Region: Kansai region

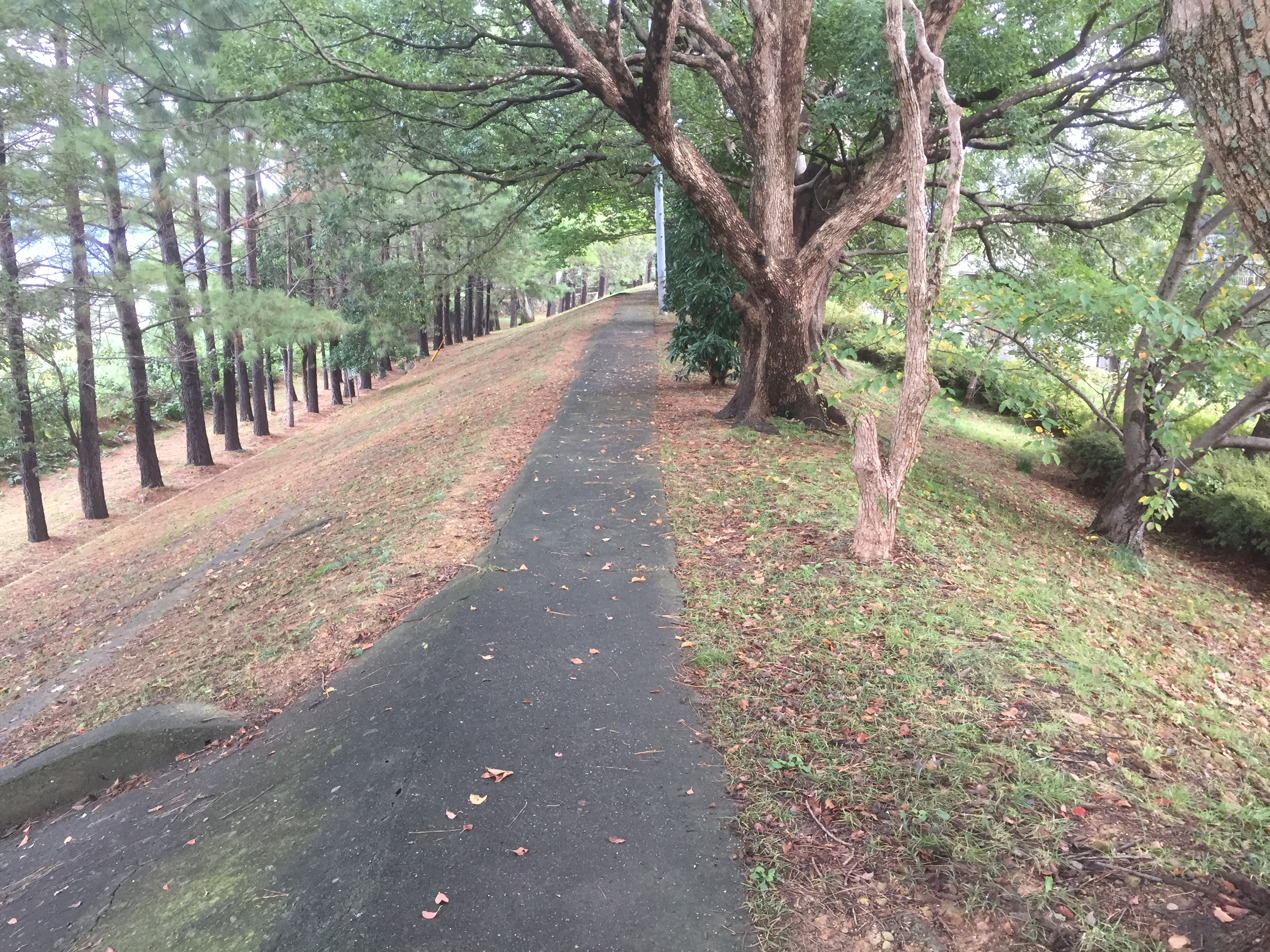
Path on the top of the Hirokawa Embankment

The Hiromura Embankment (広村堤防, Hiromura teibō) is an Edo period seawall on the Kii Channel coast in what is now part of the town of Hirogawa, Wakayama, Japan. It was designated a National Historic Site of Japan in 1938. It was built by Hamaguchi Goryō after the 1854 Ansei-Nankai earthquake and continued to protect the town against the tsunami of the 1946 Nankai earthquake.

== Overview ==
The village of Hiro is located at the innermost part of Yuasa Bay and has been severely damaged by tsunami since ancient times. During the Muromachi period, in 1399, a stone wall was constructed by the Hatakeyama clan who ruled this portion of Kii Province as a measure against tsunami. This stone wall was approximately 2.7 meters high with a length of 400 meters, and portions (now reinforced with concrete) remain in use to this day. Protection afforded by this seawall was one of the factors which led to the prosperity of the village. However, a tsunami caused by the 1605 Keichō earthquake breached this ancient defense and caused severe damage. In response, Tokugawa Yorinobu, ruler of Kishū Domain, ordered the construction of a new seawall. Called the "Wada Ishitsutsumi", it was constructed from 1661 to 1673 and was approximately 218 meters long. It protected ships from high tides, and Hiro Village flourished as a relay port. However, this seawall was breached by the tsunami of the 1707 Hōei earthquake, which devastated Hiro village, destroying 850 buildings and killing 192 persons. The wall was rebuilt by 1802, but was frequently damaged by storms and smaller tsunami, and requests for its repair were often ignored by the financially-strapped Kishū Domain.

Hiro Village was again devastated by a tsunami from the 1854 Ansei-Nankai earthquake, which destroyed 125 houses and damaged 56 more. However, the death toll was only 30 people due to the quick actions of local magistrate Hamaguchi Goryō, who ordered that stacked sheaves of rice, which were drying after the recent harvest, to be set on fire to guide the villagers to safety at the Hiro Hachiman Shrine, which was located on high ground. This action was made famous by Inamura no Hi: The Burning Rice Fields by Tsunezo Nakai (translated and published in English by Sara Cone Bryant) and Lafcadio Hearn's Gleanings in Buddha-Fields (1897), with some elaborations, and the account of his heroism became required reading in Japanese textbooks. However, many of the survivors of the disaster had lost their homes and/or their livelihoods. Hamaguchi obtained permission from Kishū Domain to build a new seawall, the Hiromura Embankment, using his own funds. The purpose was not only to protect the village against the new tsunami, but was also a public works project to provide employment and to provide reassurance to residents hesitant to return to the village after the disaster.

Construction began in February 1855, less than three months after the earthquake and was completed in December 1858, when the length of the embankment reached 670 meters. Plans to make the embankment longer were curtailed due to increasing unrest in the Bakumatsu period about the increasing incursions of foreign ships in violation of Japan's national isolation policy and the need to bolster coastal defenses. The total costs of the construction have been estimated as high as 1.86 billion Yen in modern terms.

The Hiromura Embankment has a height of approximately five meters, and a width at its base 20 meters. The total surviving length is 640 meters. There are two cut-throughs in the embankment with tide doors. One was made in 1926 and the other in 1980. The earlier Hatakeyama seawall is located in between the Hiromura Embankment and the ocean. The area in between was planted with Japanese black pine and Japanese spindle as well as Japanese lacquer. Hamaguchi intended that revenue from sales of lacquer and wax would pay for the upkeep of the embankment.

The Hiromura Embankment protected the town against a storm surge in 1913 and the tsunami of the 1944 Tōnankai earthquake as well as the estimated five-meter tsunami of the 1946 Nankai earthquake.

== See also ==
- List of Historic Sites of Japan (Wakayama)
