= World Tsunami Awareness Day =

United Nations awareness day

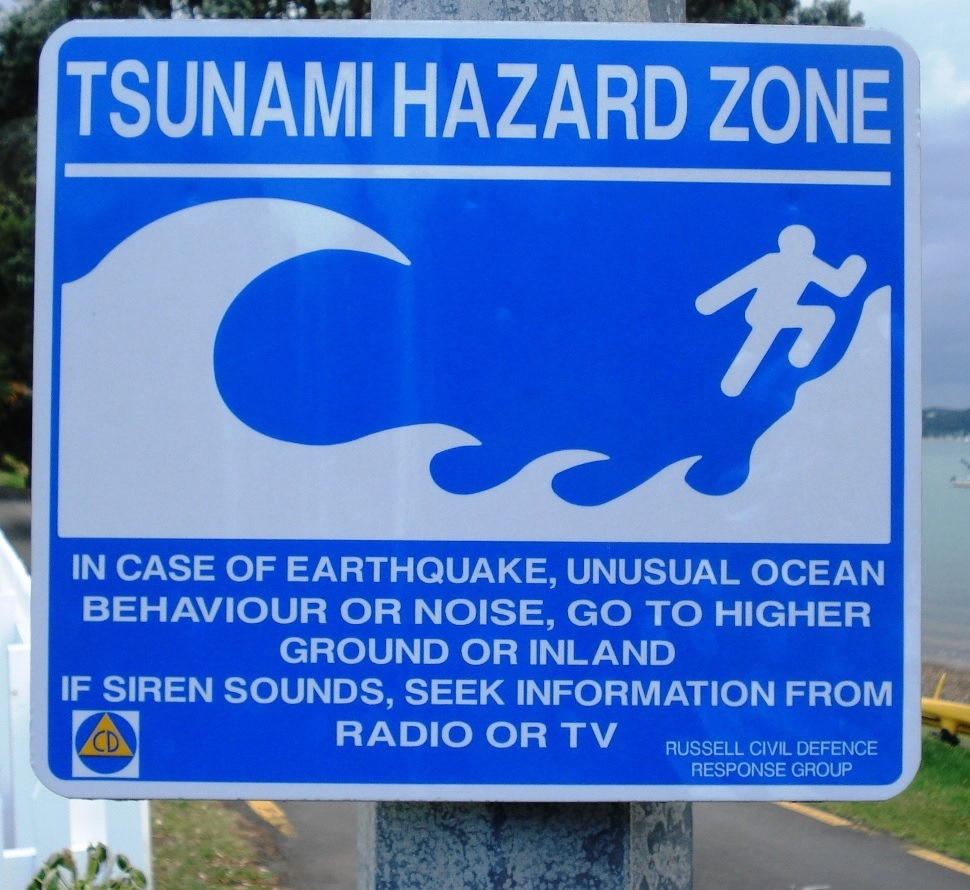
- A tsunami warning sign in Russel, New Zealand
- Also called: Tsunami Day
- Observed by: UN Members
- Date: 5 November
- Next time: 5 November 2026
- Frequency: annual
- Related to: Tsunami Emergency management

World Tsunami Awareness Day is an annual event held on 5 November to raise awareness of the dangerous effects of tsunamis and the importance of tsunami preparedness and early warning of tsunamis. It was first established in 2015 by United Nations General Assembly Resolution 70/23. On this day events are held in various countries and people are encouraged to spread awareness on social media. Tsunami awareness is very important as in the past 100 years there have been a total of 58 tsunamis with a combined death toll of over 260,000 people. Between 1998 and 2018 $200 billion was lost due to tsunamis. There is a potential for tsunami death tolls to increase in the future due to the combined effects of population increase in coastal areas and sea level rise. The official theme of World Tsunami Awareness Day 2022 is "#GetToHighGround" which encourages people to practice tsunami evacuation plans, with walks organised in Portugal and Mauritius.

== History ==
World Tsunami Awareness Day was established by United Nations General Assembly Resolution 70/203 on 22 December 2015. This day was requested specifically by the Japanese delegation as it was the day of the traditional Japanese tale of The Fire of Rice Sheaves, which remembers the actions of Hamaguchi Goryō. Hamaguchi Goryō protected his village of Hiro from a tsunami that followed the 1854 Nankai earthquake by burning his rice crop to warn and guide the villagers to safety. Yuki Matsuoka, the head of United Nations Office for Disaster Risk Reduction in Japan stated that:

Rather than selecting a memorial day or a tragic day, such as 11 March or 26 December, 5 November was selected as a ‘forward-looking’ day when many lives were saved due to proactive actions.

Hamaguchi Goryō later built a 5 meter high seawall which protected the village from the tsunami of the 1946 Nankai earthquake. This action, as well as the fact that he hired the tsunami victims to build it, has led to him becoming a model for tsunami awareness, prevention, and recovery.

== See also ==
- United Nations Office for Disaster Risk Reduction
- International Day for Disaster Risk Reduction
- Sendai Framework for Disaster Risk Reduction
- Tsunami-proof building
