= Hirogawa =

Hirogawa 広川町
- Town
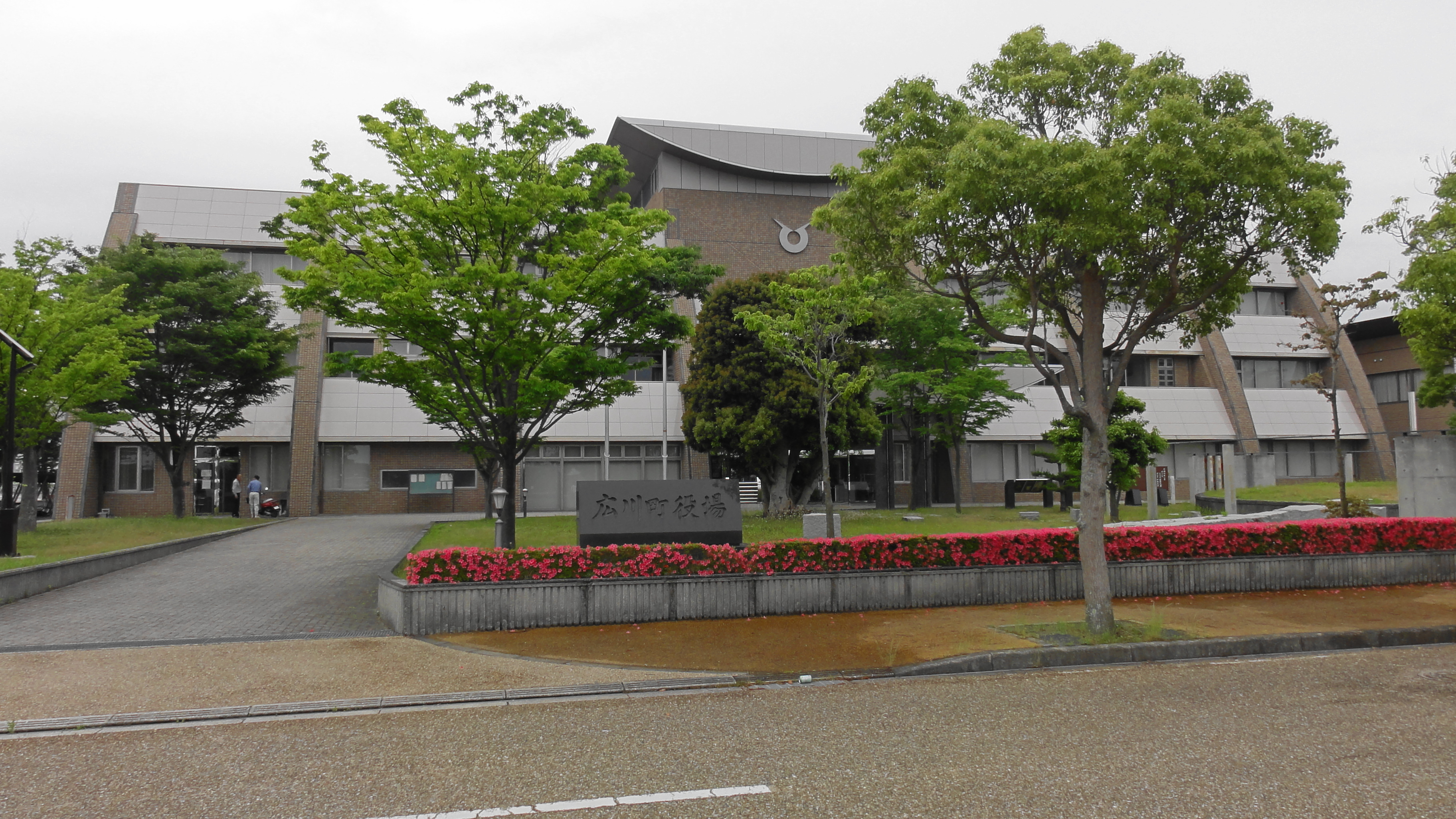
- Hirogawa Town hall

- Flag Emblem

- Location of Hirogawa in Wakayama Prefecture

- Location in Japan
- Coordinates: 34°1′48″N 135°10′23″E
- Country: Japan
- Region: Kansai
- Prefecture: Wakayama
- District: Arida

Area
  - Total: 65.33 km^{2} (25.22 sq mi)

Population (November 30, 2021)
  - Total: 6,778
  - Density: 103.8/km^{2} (268.7/sq mi)
- Time zone: UTC+09:00 (JST)
- City hall address: 1500 Hirogawa-cho, Arida-gun, Wakayama-ken 643-0071
- Website: Official website
- Symbols
- Flower: bamboo lily
- Tree: Japanese blue oak

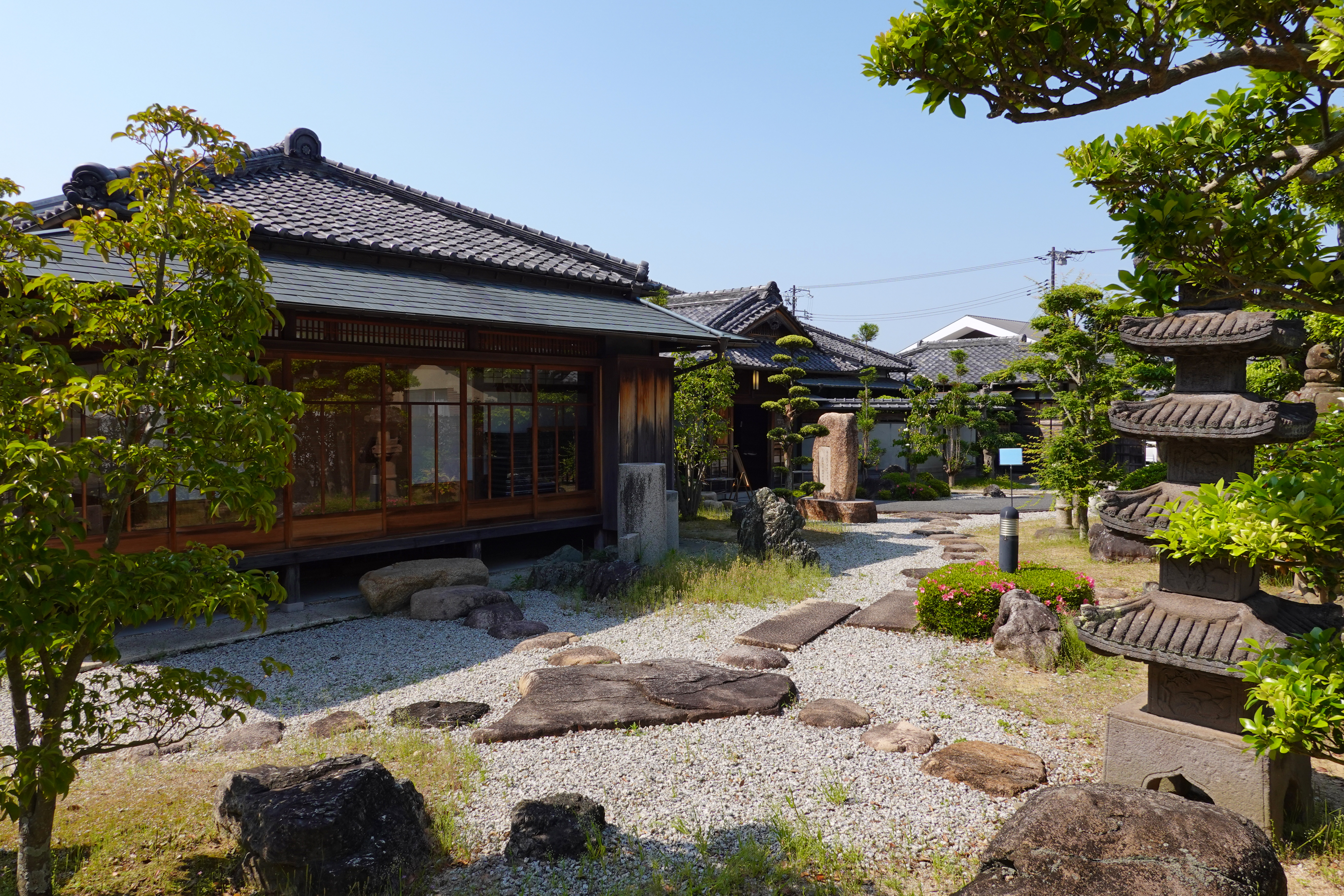
Inamura no hi no yakata

Hirogawa (広川町, Hirogawa-chō) is a town in Arida District, Wakayama Prefecture, Japan. As of 30 November 2021, the town had an estimated population of 6,778 in 2,833 households and a population density of 100 persons per km^{2}. The total area of the town is 65.33 square kilometres (25.22 sq mi).

== Geography ==
Hirogawa is located on the coast in north-central Wakayama Prefecture, facing the Kii Channel. The Hirogawa River flows through the town. The climate is moderated by the influence of the Kuroshio Current offshore.

=== Neighboring municipalities ===
Wakayama Prefecture

- Aridagawa
- Hidaka
- Hidakagawa
- Yuasa
- Yura

== Climate ==
Hirogawa has a humid subtropical climate (Köppen Cfa) characterized by warm summers and cool winters with light to no snowfall. The average annual temperature in Hirogawa is 15.7 °C. The average annual rainfall is 1878 mm with September as the wettest month. The temperatures are highest on average in August, at around 26.0 °C, and lowest in January, at around 5.8 °C. The area is subject to typhoons in summer.

== Demographics ==
Per Japanese census data, the population of Hirogawa has remained fairly steady over the past century.

Historical population
Year	Pop.	±%
1920	7,015	—
1930	8,305	+18.4%
1940	8,493	+2.3%
1950	10,410	+22.6%
1960	8,951	−14.0%
1970	8,920	−0.3%
1980	9,178	+2.9%
1990	8,809	−4.0%
2000	8,361	−5.1%
2010	7,717	−7.7%

== History ==
The area of the modern town of Hirogawa was within ancient Kii Province, and remains from the Jōmon period through the Kofun period indicate many centuries of settlement. During the Edo period, the hamlet of Hiro was a fishing port and farming settlement. The hamlet became famous during the 1854 Ansei-Nankai earthquake, when local headman Hamaguchi Goryō saved the lives of the villagers by setting fires to rice sheaves to guide villagers to a hilltop to save them from a tsunami. The story was popularized by Inamura no Hi: The Burning Rice Fields by Tsunezo Nakai (translated and published in English by Sara Cone Bryant) and Lafcadio Hearn's Gleanings in Buddha-Fields (1897). Hamaguchi devoted himself to helping fellow villagers find jobs and built confidence by constructing a huge seawall. He also established a private academy called "Taikyu-sha" (current Taikyu Junior/High School) to give the villagers the opportunity to learn. (According to the school record, they are not teaching the way to be successful or be famous but to be practical in many ways, such as farming and ironing.) In 1907, George Trumbull Ladd, assisting Marquis Ito Hirobumi, visited the school and later published his journal Rare Days in Japan (1910).

The village of Hiro was established with the creation of the modern municipalities system on April 1, 1889. It was raised to town status on October 1, 1950. On April 1, 1955, Hiro merged with the neighboring villages of Minamihiro and Tsugi, becoming the town of Hirogawa.

=== In literature ===
George Trumbull Ladd briefly described his visit in another book In Korea with Marquis Ito (1908) as follows:

We had taken a trip to the village of Hiro Mura, where formerly lived Hamaguchi Goryo, the benevolent patron of his village, whose act of self-sacrifice in burning his rice straw in order to guide the bewildered villagers to a place of safety when they were being overwhelmed by a tidal wave in the darkness of midnight, has been made the theme of one of Lafcadio Hearn’s interesting tales. Mr. Hearn, it appears, had never visited the locality; and, indeed, we were assured that we were the first foreigners who had ever been in the village streets. A former pupil of mine is at the head of a flourishing school patronized by the Hamaguchi family; and having accepted his invitation, in the name of the entire region, to visit them and speak to the school and to the teachers of the Prefecture, the cordial greeting, hospitable entertainment, and the surpassingly beautiful scenery, afforded a rich reward for the three or four days of time required. For, as to the scenery, not the drive around the Bay of Naples or along the Bosphorus excels in natural beauty the jinrikisha ride that surmounts the cliffs, or clings to their sides, above the bay of Shimidzu (“Clear Water”); while for a certain picturesque-ness of human interest it surpasses them both. On the way back to Wakayama – for Hiro Mura is more than twenty miles from the nearest railway station- three men to each jinrikisha, running with scarcely a pause and at a rate that would have gained credit for any horse as a fairly good roadster, brought us to the well-situated tea-house at Wakano-ura. For centuries the most celebrated of Japanese poets with the women gathering seaweed at low tide, the fishermen in the offing, the stocks standing on one leg in the water or flying above the rushed of the salt marsh. Here we were met for tiffin by the Governor of the Prefecture and the mayor of the city, and immediately after escorted to the city hall of Wakayama where an audience of some eight hundred, officials and teachers, had already assembled. While in the waiting-room of this hall, a telegram from Mr. Yokoi was handed to me, announcing that Marquis Ito had already left Oiso and would reach Kyoto that very evening and arrange to see me the next day.

== Government ==
Hirogawa has a mayor-council form of government with a directly elected mayor and a unicameral city council of 10 members. Hirogawa collectively with the other municipalities of Arida District, contributes two members to the Wakayama Prefectural Assembly. In terms of national politics, the town is part of Wakayama 3rd district of the lower house of the Diet of Japan.

== Economy ==
The economy of Hirogawa is centered on commercial fishing and horticulture.

== Education ==
Hirogawa has three public elementary schools and two public middle schools operated by the town governments and one public high school operated by the Wakayama Prefectural Board of Education.

== Transportation ==
=== Railway ===
JR West – Kisei Main Line

- Hirokawa Beach

=== Highways ===
- Yuasa-Gobo Road
- National Route 42

== Local attractions ==
- Hiro Hachiman-jinja
- Hiromura Embankment, National Historic Site

== See also ==
- The Fire of Rice Sheaves
