= Willy Pogany =

Hungarian artist (1882–1955)

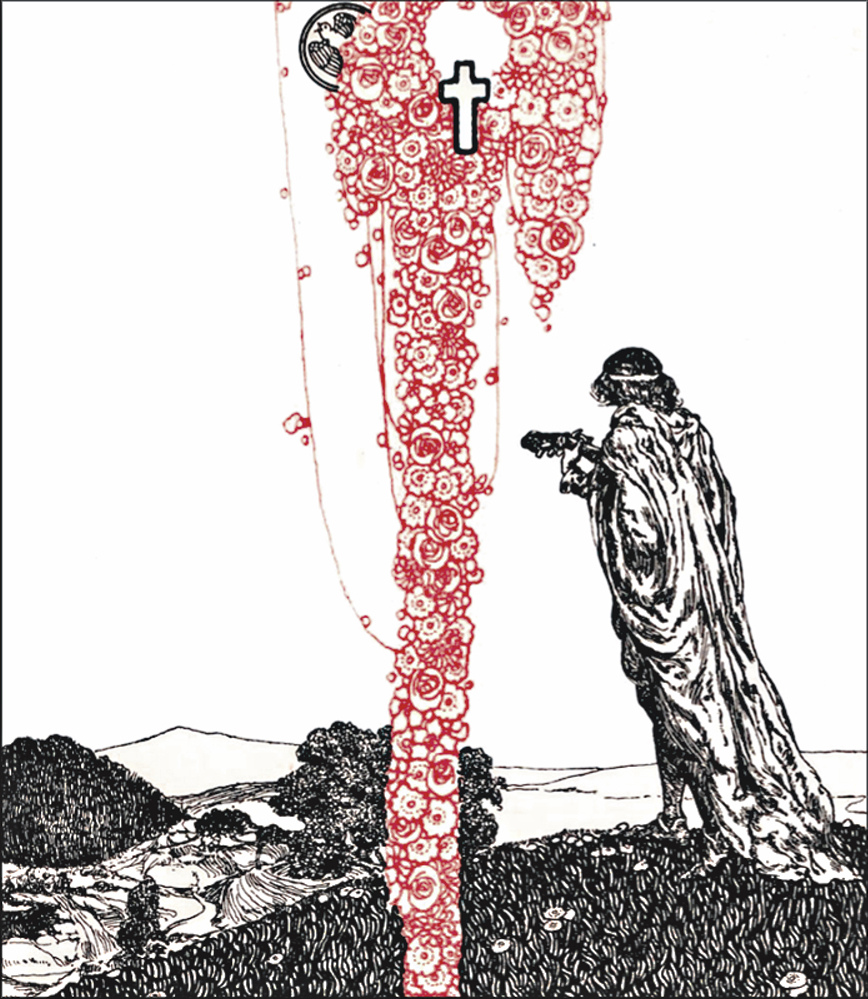
- Illustration by Willy Pogany from Walk Me Through My Dreams by Joe Lindsay (1911)
- Born: Vilmos András Feichtmann (aka Feuchtmann); August 24, 1882; Szeged, Austria-Hungary
- Died: July 30, 1955 (aged 72); Manhattan, New York City, U.S.
- Citizenship: United States (naturalized 1921)
- Known for: painting
- Notable work: illustrated books
- Movement: Art Nouveau

William Andrew Pogany (born Vilmos András Feichtmann (or Feuchtmann); August 24, 1882 – July 30, 1955) was a prolific Hungarian illustrator of children's and other books. His contemporaries include C. Coles Phillips, Joseph Clement Coll, Edmund Dulac, Harvey Dunn, Walter Hunt Everett, Harry Rountree, Sarah Stilwell Weber, and N.C. Wyeth. He is best known for his pen and ink drawings of myths and fables. A large portion of Pogany's work is described as Art Nouveau. Pogany's artistic style is heavily fairy-tale orientated and often feature motifs of mythical animals such as nymphs and pixies. He paid great attention to botanical details. He used dreamy and warm pastel scenes with watercolors, oil paintings, and especially pen and ink.

== Background ==
Pogany was born in Szeged, Austria-Hungary as Vilmos Feichtmann (aka Feuchtmann) to Heléne (née Kolisch) and Joseph Feichtmann. He studied at Budapest Technical University and in Munich and Paris. He spent his early childhood with his brothers and sisters in a large farmhouse full of chickens, ducks, geese, dogs, pigs, and horses.

When he was six, his parents took him to Budapest where he would later be sent to school. He had early ambitions of becoming an engineer in the hopes of looking after his mother after his father died. He especially liked to row and to play outdoor games. In his spare time, he drew pictures and painted. He enjoyed painting and drawing so much he decided to be an artist. He attended Budapest Technical School for less than a year, during this time he took art classes for six weeks. He sold his first painting to a wealthy patron for $24. In 1903, both he and his sister Paula legally changed their surname to Pogány and the Szeged City Council requested the rabbinate to correct their registration in the official Jewish records.

He spent his early twenties attending art school and would later travel to Munich, Paris, and London before coming to the United States in 1914. When Pogany went to Paris to study and paint, he was unable to secure much attention or income, was often poor and went hungry. Pogany spent two years in Paris.

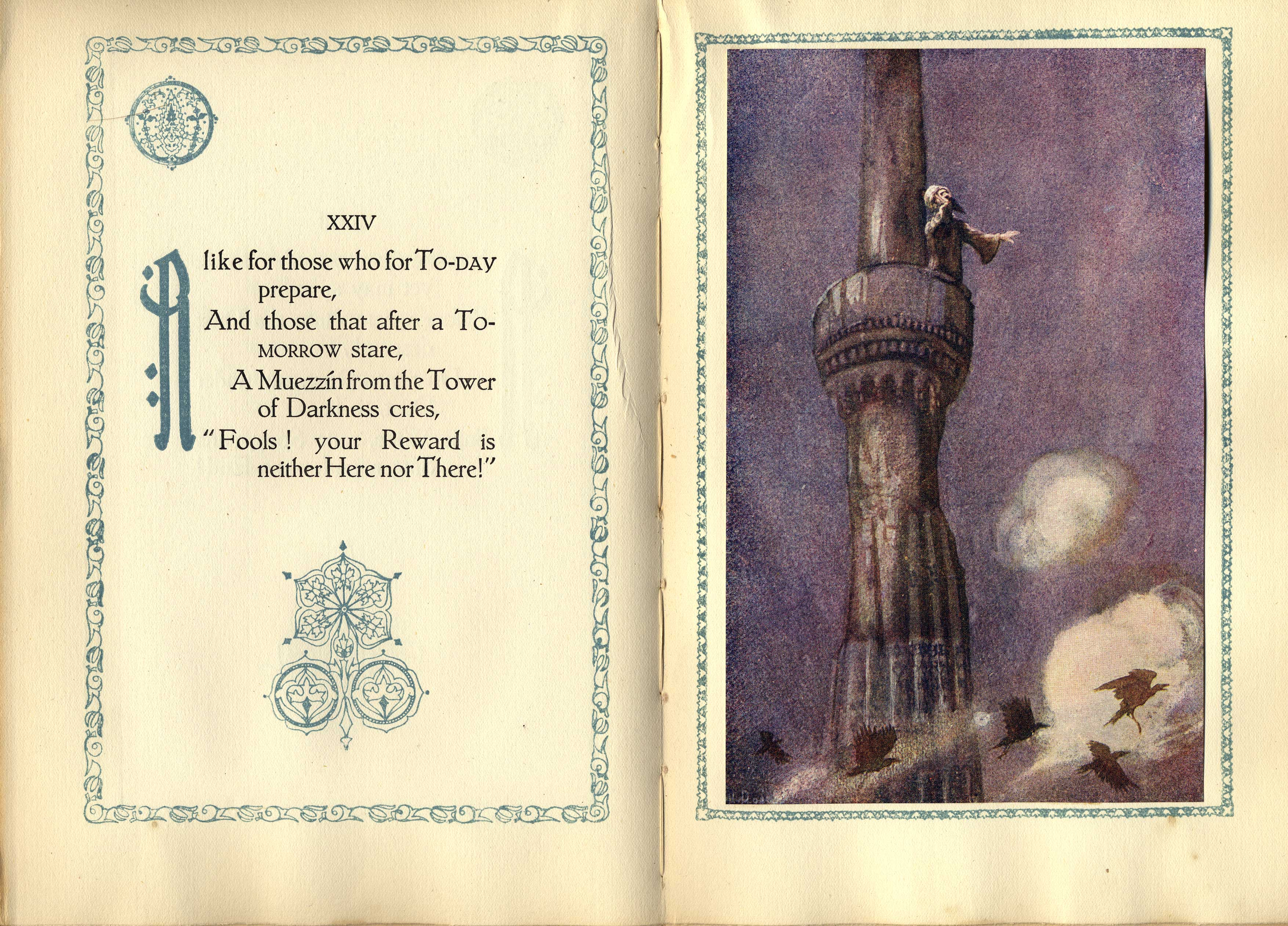
Facing pages from Rubaiyat of Omar Khayyam illustrated by Pogany.

When he finally saved up some money from his work, he left Paris to go to London. In 1906, Arthur Rackham's Rip Van Winkle gained massive popularity, sparking a demand for artists in London. At this point Pogany was hired to provide the design For The Welsh Fairy Book by T. Fisher Unwin, including over 100 plates, illustrations, vignettes, chapter heads and tails, and initials. He also did 48 illustrations for Milly and Olly, 70 for The Adventures of a Dodo and 39 for Faust.

After ten years in London, Pogany emigrated to America. Besides book illustration, pictures, mural paintings, portraits, etchings, and sculptures, Pogany became interested in theatre and designed stage settings and costumes for different shows and the Metropolitan Opera House. He eventually moved to Hollywood to serve as an art director for several film studios during the 1930s and 1940s.

== Career ==
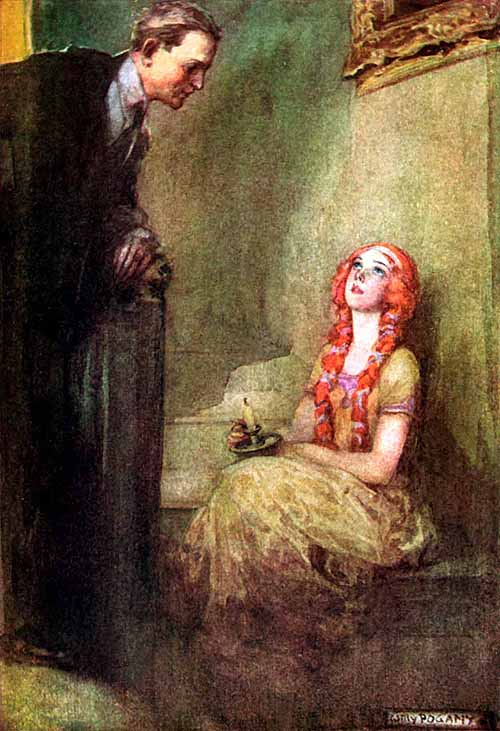
Illustration for the frontispiece of The Wishing-Ring Man by Margaret Widdemer (Holt, 1917)

In London, he crafted his quartet of masterpieces: The Rime of the Ancient Mariner (1910), Tannhauser (1911), Parsifal (1912) and Lohengrin (1913). Each of these was designed completely by Pogany, from the covers and endpapers to the text written in pen and ink, pencil, wash, color and tipped-on plates.

The Ancient Mariner, a large book 9.5" by 11.75". is recognized as his masterpiece. Each page has at least two colors, sometimes with gilt plate accompanied by intricate borders. The initials are elaborate, starting each page and with ornate capitals at the beginning of every line. The illuminated title page, 18 color plates, the second color through black-and-white plates, the flowing calligraphic text, and the pen-and-ink drawings throughout the pages make this a stand out among Pogany's works.

The 1911 edition of The Rime of the Ancient Mariner featured ivory paper and lavender borders. In his illustartions for Richard Wagner's Lohengrin and Tannhäuser, Pogany utilized different colored paper stocks and variety of media, including color pencil, watercolor, and pen and ink..

In Lohengrin, Pogany set his soft color pencil drawings against the grays. In Tannhauser, Pogany used paper color for further additional dimension. From soft pastel pencil drawings to watercolor paintings and pen and ink, Pogany utilized a variety of media in his illustrations.

Pogany illustrated Padraic Colum's The King of Ireland's Son (1916). These illustrations depict the journey of the hero, Fedelma, and Flann. Notable imagery in the book included a horse-headed giant with the head of a Clydesdale plough horse, a scene depicting the theft of a swan skin, and a sequence where the characters are attacked by a cloud of crows.

Pogany worked as an art director on several Hollywood films, including Fashions of 1934 and Dames. He began his involvement in motion picture set design in 1924 and worked in film until the end of the 1930s. He was commissioned by John Ringling, Ettenger, Reiner and William Randolph Hearst's Wyntoon Estate, painted for the Barrymore family, Douglas Fairbanks Jr., Carole Lombard, Enrico Caruso, Miriam Hopkins, and many others. In 1939, Pogany designed an animated cartoon, Scrambled Eggs, based on a story by his wife Elaine, for producer Walter Lantz. The star character of the Lantz cartoon, Peterkin, became the title character of a children's book the Poganys released the next year.

Pogany was awarded gold medals in Budapest and Leipzig Expo as well as the London Masonic Medal, and became a Fellow of the London Royal Society of Art. The New York Society of Architects gave him a silver medal for his mural in the August Heckscher's Children's Theatre showing Cinderella, Hansel and Gretel, and Jack in the Beanstalk. He won a gold medal in 1915 at the Panama Pacific Expo for his work The Valkyries (Walkürenritt). and was also awarded the Hungarian Silver Blue Medal.

In 1914, Pogany's illustrations appeared on the cover of Metropolitan Magazine, Ladies Home Journal, Harper's Weekly, Hearst's Town & Country, Theatre Magazine and American Weekly. In 1917 to 1921, he worked for the Metropolitan Opera designing sketches, scenery and costumes. In 1918 he illustrated a children's retelling of Homer, The Adventures of Odysseus and the Tale of Troy written by Padraic Colum.

== Lawsuit ==
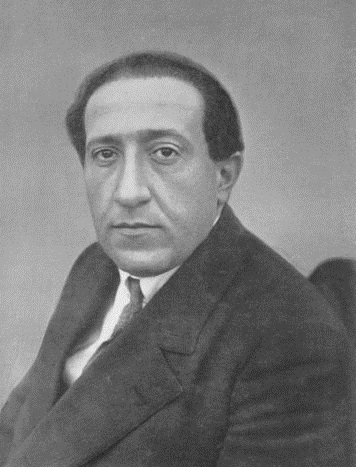
Pogany sued Whittaker Chambers for mistaking him as a relative of Comintern official Joseph Pogany (pictured)

In his 1952 autobiography Witness, Whittaker Chambers erroneously described "Willi Pogany" ("long a scene designer at the Metropolitan Opera House") as the brother of Joseph Pogany.

Willy Pogany sued Chambers for $1 million but lost in court and appeals. According to Time magazine, "A lower court had found that Chambers, in his mistaken identification, had not maliciously implied that Willy was closely associated with 'a Communist leader and spy'," who had been "once (until Stalin liquidated him) Communist Hungary's puppet Commissar of War."

== Personal life ==
Pogany married Lillian Rose Doris in 1908 in London, and had two sons with her: Peter and John Pogany. They moved to New York City in 1914 and he was naturalized in 1921. In 1933 they divorced. The following year, he married writer Elaine Cox. He died in New York City on July 30, 1955.

Asked how his name was pronounced, he told the Literary Digest that in America it was po-GAH-ny. "However, in my native Hungary this name is pronounced with the accent on the first syllable with a slightly shorter o and the gany is as the French -gagne (the y is silent)": PO-gahn.

== Works ==
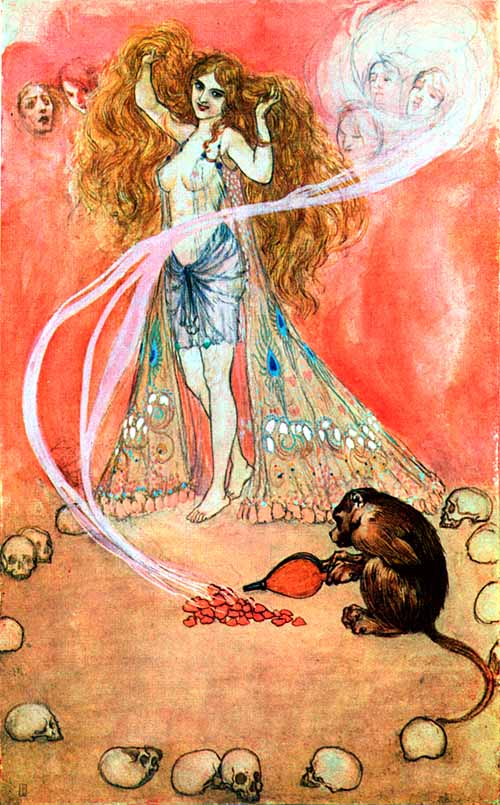
"The Young Witch", illustration for a 1908 edition of Faust

Pogany's public art appears on walls of the John and Mable Ringling Museum of Art (formerly Ringling Mansion) in Sarasota, Florida, in New York City at the El Museo del Barrio theater (1230 Fifth Avenue), P.S. 43 Jonas Bronck in Mott Haven, and the Bernard B. Jacobs Theatre (45th Street) and in The Strand Theatre at The Appell Center for the Performing Arts in York, PA.

Written or illustrated by Pogany:

- Kúnos, Ignác- Turkish Fairy Tales, Burt 1901
- Farrow, G. E. - The Adventures of a Dodo, Unwin 1907
- Thomas, William Jenkyn- The Welsh Fairy Book, Unwin 1907
- Ward, Mary Augusta - Milly and Olly, Unwin 1907
- Edgar, Madalen G. - Treasury of Verse for Little Children, Harrap 1908
- Goethe, J. W. von - Faust, Hutchinson 1908
- Dasent, G. W. - Norse Wonder Tales, Collins, 1909
- Hawthorne, Nathaniel - Tanglewood Tales, Unwin, 1909
- The Rubaiyat of Omar Khayyam, Harrap 1909
- Coleridge, S. T. - The Rime of the Ancient Mariner, Harrap 1910
- Gask, L. - Folk Tales from Many Lands, Harrap 1910
- Young, Gerald - The Witch s Kitchen, Harrap 1910
- Wagner, Richard - Tannhäuser, Harrap, 1911
- Gask, L. - The Fairies and the Christmas Child, Harrap 1912
- Wagner, R.- Parsifal, Harrap 1912
- Heine, Heinrich - Alta Troll, Sidgwick 1913
- Kúnos, I. - Forty-Four Turkish Fairy Tales, Harrap 1913
- Pogany, W. - The Hungarian Fairy Book, Unwin 1913
- Wagner, R. - The Tale of Lohengrin, Harrap 1913
- Pogany, W. - Children, Harrap 1914
- A Series of Books for Children, Harrap 1915
- More Tales from the Arabian Nights, Holt 1915
- Colum, Padraic - The King of Ireland's Son, Holt 1916
- Swift, Jonathan - Gulliver's Travels, Macmillan 1917
- Bryant, Sara Cone - Stories to Tell the Little Ones, Harrap 1918
- Colum, Padraic - Adventures of Odysseus, Macmillan 1918
- Olcutt, Frances Jenkins - Tales of the Persian Genii, Harrap 1919
- Skinner, Eleanor Louise - Children's Plays, Appleton 1919
- Elias, Edith L. - Red Riding Hood, Holt 1920
- Colum, Padraic-The Children of Odin, Harrap 1920
- The Adventures of Haroun El Raschid, Holt 1923
- Newman, Isadora - Fairy Flowers, Milford 1926
- Flanders, Helen Hartness - Looking Out of Jimmie, Dent 1928
- Carroll, Lewis - Alice's Adventures in Wonderland, Dutton 1929
- Pogany, W. - Mother Goose, Nelson 1929
- Anthony, Joseph - Casanova Jones, Century 1930
- Pogany, W. - Magyar Fairy Tales, Dutton 1930
- Burton, Richard F. - The Kasidah of Haji Abdu El-Yezdi, McKay 1931
- Arnold, Edwin - The Light of Asia, 1932
- Arnold, E. - The Song Celestial or Bhagavad-Gita, 1934
- Huffard, Grace Thompson - My Poetry Book, Winston 1934
- Pushkin, Alexander - The Golden Cockerel, Nelson 1938
- Pogany, Elaine - Peterkin, 1940
- Bennett, Paula Pogany - The Art of Hungarian Cooking, 1954

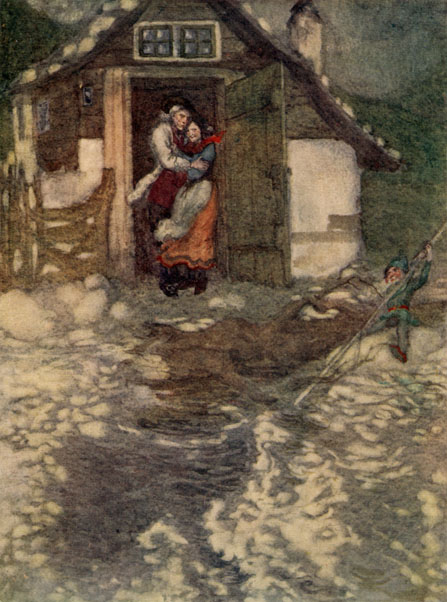
"'How now?' cried a reassuring voice", illustration for "The Little White Feather", a fairy tale by Lilian Gask

Pogany illustrated more than 150 volumes, including:

- The Adventures of Odysseus
- The Tale of Troy
- The Children of Odin
- The Golden Fleece
- The King of Ireland's Son
- Gulliver's Travels
- Bible Stories to Read and Tell
- Little Tailor of the Winding Way
- Tisza Tales
- The Treasure of Verse for Little Children
- Magyar Fairy Tales
- Drawing Lessons
- The Art of Drawing
- Story of Hiawatha (c.1914)

Pogany wrote three instructional books: Willy Pogany's Drawing Lessons, Willy Pogany's Oil Painting Lessons, and Willy Pogany's Water Color Lessons, Including Gouache. He completed them at the end of his final years in New York.
