= Epaminondas (children's story) =

1907 book by Sara Cone Bryant

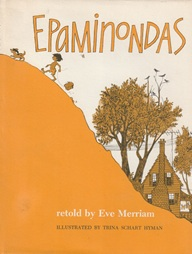
Cover of the 1968 book by Eve Merriam

Epaminondas is a children's story that was originally transmitted orally in the Black community of the Southern States of the United States. A little boy named Epaminondas makes a series of amusing mistakes which are caused when he does the right thing at the wrong time, or takes metaphorical language literally. The humor derives from the problem of miscommunication between adults and children. The story was first published in 1907 among a collection of other short stories, followed by an illustrated standalone publication in 1911 that quickly became popular. The 1911 book has been widely criticized for racial stereotyping, and later versions of it have attempted to rectify this.

== Sara Cone Bryant ==
The first printed version of the story was entitled "The Story of Epaminondas and His Auntie", published by Sara Cone Bryant in her 1907 book Stories to Tell to Children. In the book's opening chapter, Bryant highlighted the story as belonging to "a very large, very ancient type of funny story", and when referring to the story's ability to teach children, stated that "one Epaminondas is worth three lectures."

Bryant later published the first standalone version, entitled Epaminondas and His Auntie, in 1911 with illustrations done by Inez Hogan.

As with Helen Bannerman's The Story of Little Black Sambo, which was originally written about a boy from Southern India but was later illustrated in many printings with stereotypes of African Americans, the illustrated version of Bryant's book has been criticized as having racist overtones and stereotypes. In 1941, Bryant's text was reprinted by Harrap with new illustrations by Honor C. Appleton and Patten Wilson.

== Later versions ==
Later versions of the tale were published by Constance Egan (illustrated by A.E. Kennedy), Eve Merriam (1968, with illustrations by Trina Schart Hyman), Mary Claire Pinckney and Cathy East Dubowski.

In one Spanish version, the illustrations show Epaminondas as a white child.
