= Constance Egan =

English author and editor

Constance Egan (1890 - 31 December 1975) was an English author and editor.

== Biography ==
Constance Egan was born in 1890. She was the second wife of Raymond Brooke-Little, an electrical engineer, and mother of John Brooke-Little. John founded the Society of Heraldic Antiquaries (now known as The Heraldry Society) in 1947, and Egan became managing editor of its journal The Coat of Arms. She served in this role until 1965, employing the editorial skills honed in the 1920s as the editor of Home Chat.

Her written works include several children's story works, such as the Epaminondas books (Epaminondas and the lettuces, Epaminondas and his mammy's umbrella, Epaminondas helps in the garden, Epaminondas tries to be brave, Epaminondas and the puppy, Epaminondas and the eggs) from the late 1950s and early 1960s, illustrated by A.E. Kennedy, using the character from the folk tales also written about by Sara Cone Bryant in Epaminondas and His Auntie in the early 20th century. The storyline, depiction and illustrations of the African-American characters has been criticized as being racist and depicting stereotypes. Egan also wrote about the adventures of Jummy the Baby Elephant.

Egan died in 1975.
