= Two-headed giant =

Two-Headed Giant is the title of a multi-player format for the Magic: The Gathering trading card game.

Two-headed giant is also the title or description of a number of characters from legend and fiction:

- Boola in the Popeye the Sailor Meets Sindbad the Sailor cartoon short film
- The ettin in the Dungeons & Dragons role-playing game
- The ettin in the Three Thieves graphic novel series
- Gregor and Dane in the Kings of the Wyld fantasy novel
- Pire in The Chronicles of Narnia novel series
- Thunderdell, a two-headed giant from Cornwall appearing the story Jack the Giant Killer
- Two-Headed Giant in My Knight and Me TV series
- Two-Headed Giant in the Popeye and Son TV series
- Two-Headed Giant, an animated short film by Terrytoons
- A two-headed giant appears in the Adventures of Gilla Na Chreck An Gour Iris fairy tale
- A two-headed giant appears in the Garfield and Friends television series
- A two-headed giant appears in "Stupid Marco", a short story in The Practical Princess and Other Liberating Fairy Tales
- Two-headed giants appear in European folklore
