= The Fire of Rice Sheaves =

Japanese story based on the 1854 earthquake and tsunami of Nankai

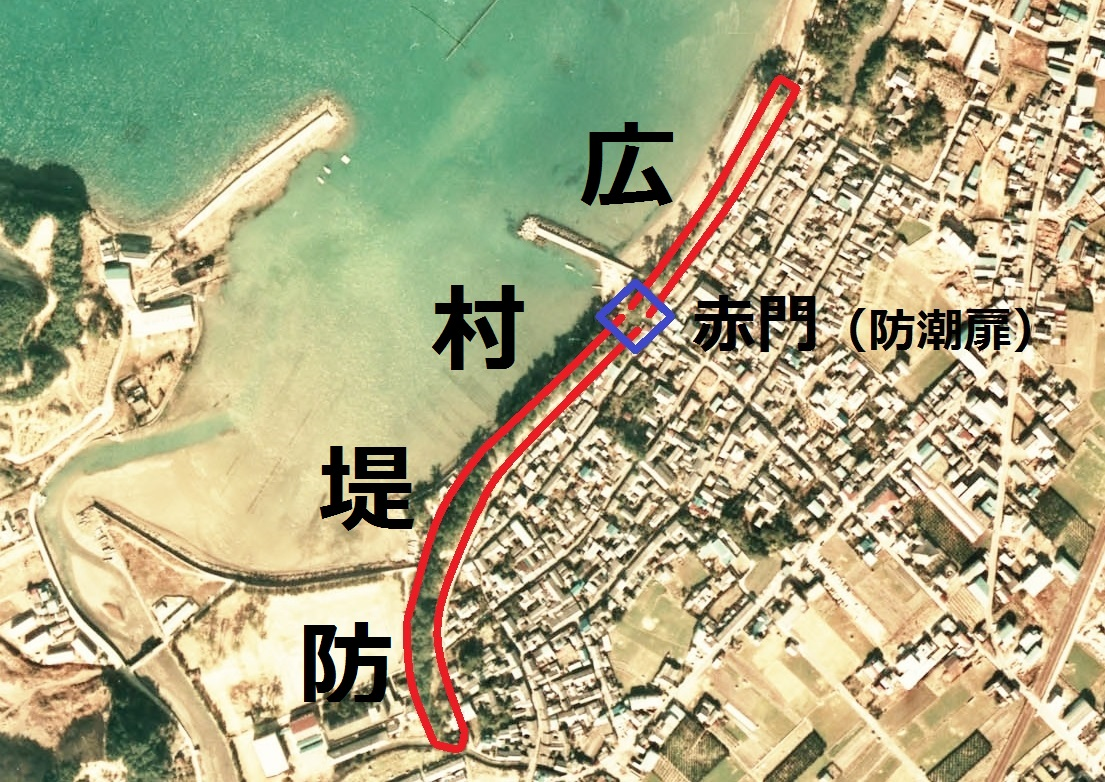
Hiromura Teibo Seawall Aerial photograph

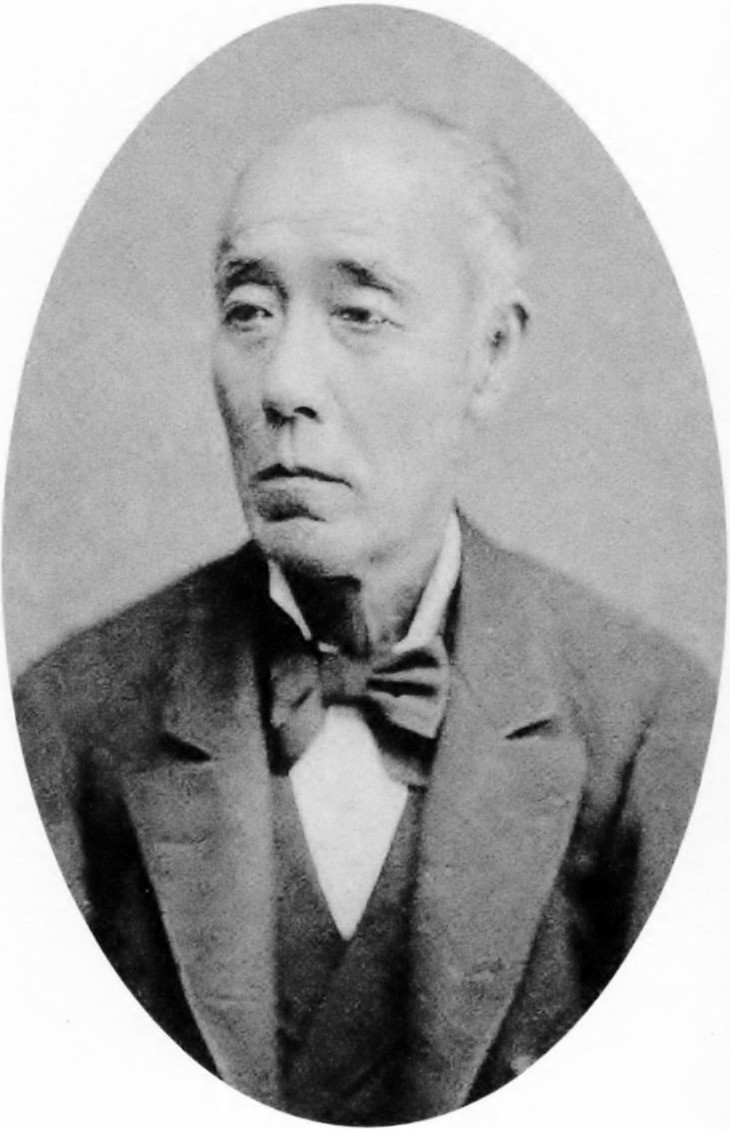
Goryo Hamaguchi

The Fire of Rice Sheaves (稲むらの火, Inamura no Hi) is a story based on the events of the 1854 Nankai earthquake's tsunami.

== Overview ==
Before the 1854 tsunami struck Hiro (now Hirogawa), Goryo Hamaguchi lit fire to sheaves of rice (inamura) to help guide villagers to safety. This event appeared in the 1897 story "A living god" by the Greek-born writer Lafcadio Hearn, which combined the events in Hiro with the events of the 1896 Sanriku earthquake that struck Honshu. Hamaguchi saved many of his fellow villagers from the massive tsunami. By setting fire to rice-straw stacks, villagers were able to see them from afar and find their way to safety on hilltops. Hamaguchi also devoted himself to helping fellow villagers find jobs and rebuilding their lives, including by hiring them to construct a huge seawall. The story chronicling Goryo's heroism and the accounts of his efforts was introduced into Japanese textbooks.

Tsunezo Nakai wrote a story about him called "Inamura no Hi: The burning rice fields", which Sara Cone Bryant and Lafcadio Hearn translated into English.

Thanks to the story Inamura no Hi: The Burning Rice Fields by Tsunezo Nakai (translated and published in English by Sara Cone Bryant) and Lafcadio Hearn's Gleanings in Buddha-Fields (1897), Hirogawa (then Hiro-Mura) is often said to be the home of a living god: Goryo Hamaguchi (1820-1885).

Goryo Hamaguchi and others founded a private academy called "Taikyu-sha" (now Taikyu Junior/High School) to give the villagers affected by the tsunami educational opportunities. According to the school records, they do not teach how to be successful or famous but rather how to be practical in daily life, such as through farming and ironing.

In 1907, George Trumbull Ladd, assisting Marquis Ito (Hirofumi), visited the school and later published his journal Rare Days in Japan (1910) in the U.S.
