= George Albee =

American psychologist

George W. Albee
- Born: December 20, 1921; St. Marys, Pennsylvania
- Died: July 8, 2006 (aged 84); Longboat Key, Florida
- Citizenship: American
- Known for: Founder of community psychology
- Scientific career
- Fields: Community psychology Human Psychology, Clinical Psychology, Research Psychology, Developmental Psychology
- Workplaces: American Psychological Association, Case Western Reserve University, University of Vermont

George Wilson Albee (December 20, 1921 – July 8, 2006) was an American clinical psychologist who believed societal factors such as unemployment, racism, sexism, and the myriad forms of exploitation of people by people were the major cause of mental illness. He was one of the leading figures in the development of community psychology. Albee was an advocate for coping with adversity, strengthening individual resources, and social change. While there, he married Constance Impallaria, They had four children.

== Early life ==
Albee was born in St. Marys, Pennsylvania. He attended Bethany College and graduated in 1943 with a Master’s degree. He was drafted into the Army Air Forces and served until the end of World War II. During his army days, he was exposed to more diversity than what he previously knew from his hometown in Pennsylvania, and with this he was exposed to more diversity in cultures.

After leaving the forces Albee attended the University of Pittsburgh where he attained his masters and doctoral degrees. Having received his doctorate in 1949 he spent the next two years in a research appointment at Western Psychiatric Institute. From 1951 to 1953 he worked for the central office of the American Psychological Association. He was a distinguished member of Psi Chi psychology honor society.

In 1953 Albee spent a year at the University of Helsinki, Finland as a Fulbright scholar.

== Academia ==
Albee returned to the United States in 1954. Upon his return, he became an associate professor at Case Western Reserve University, after which he became a full professor. In 1958 he became the George Trumbull Ladd Distinguished Professor of Psychology.

During the 1950s and 1960s, Albee wrote studies that showed societal factors such as poverty, racism, sexism and child abuse, were to a large degree responsible for mental illness. He believed the psychological profession needed to focus more on prevention, rather than one to one treatment.

In 1963 Albee served on the National Institute of Mental Health training grants review committee. One of his responsibilities was to judge the aptness of proposed mental health training programs. From 1969-70 he was the president of the American Psychological Association (APA). During his tenure he negotiated conflicts between the mainstream of psychology and the demands of Black and female psychologists.

During his presidency of the APA, Albee challenged norms and current wisdom as it pertains to the improvement of humankind’s welfare. Before becoming president of the APA, Albee served as an assistant executive secretary for it, in which capacity he was responsible for public information, relations, and placement. In addition to his presidency and secretary positions at the APA, he was also a member of nine of its divisions. Some of these divisions include the Society of Clinical Psychology, Society for Community Research and Action, Society for the Psychology of Women, and Society for the Psychological Study of Lesbian, Gay, and Bisexual Issues.

In 1971 Albee left Case Western University to become professor of psychology at the University of Vermont. Shortly afterwards, in 1975 he established the Vermont Conference on Primary Prevention.

In his article "the prevention of sexism” (1981), he defined sexism and its consequences, as well as describing secondary and tertiary prevention methods to those men and women who suffer as a result of sexism. In his article “Preventing psychopathology and promoting human potential” (1982), he addressed primary prevention methods to decrease unnecessary stress and increase social competence, self-esteem, and support networks.

Albee was troubled by the consequences of poverty and other social issues on mental health. One of his greatest missions, was improving the field of prevention of psychopathology.

== Retirement ==
In December 1991, Albee reached the age of 70 and retired from the post of professor of psychology at the University of Vermont. During his retirement he spent time travelling around the world giving lectures on psychology as well as writing a humor column for his local newspaper the Longboat Observer.

Albee died after a short illness in Longboat Key, Florida. He was married Margeret Tong and they had four children.

== Positions and awards ==
- 1958. The George Trumbull Ladd Distinguished Professor of Psychology.
- 1982. Division 27 Award for Distinguished Contributions to Community Psychology and Community Mental Health.
- 1988. Served on President Dwight Eisenhower’s Commission on Mental Health.
- 1969-1970. The 78th President of the American Psychological Association.
- 1975. The American Psychological Association Distinguished Professional Contribution Award.
- 1977-1978. Appointed to serve on President Jimmy Carter’s Commission on Mental Health and was appointed as the coordinator of the Task Panel on Prevention.
- 1993. The American Psychological Foundation Gold Medal Award for Life Achievement in Psychology in the Public Interest.

== Selected publications ==
=== Articles ===
- Albee, George W. (1981). "The prevention of sexism". Professional Psychology. 12 (1): 20–28.
- —— (1982). "Preventing psychopathology and promoting human potential". American Psychologist. 37 (9): 1043.
- —— (1986). "Toward a just society: Lessons from observations on the primary prevention of psychopathology". American Psychologist. 41 (8): 891–898.
- —— (1998). "Fifty years of clinical psychology: Selling our soul to the devil". Applied and Preventative Psychology. 7 (3): 189–194.
- —— (2000). "The future of primary prevention". Journal of Primary Prevention. 21 (1): 7–9.
- —— (2002). "Exploring a controversy (Editorial)" (PDF). American Psychologist. 57 (3): 161–164. Archived from the original on 5 March 2016.

=== Chapters ===
- Albee, George W. (1969). "We have been warned!". In Ryan, William (ed.). Distress in the city; essays on the design and administration of urban mental health services. Cleveland, Ohio: The Press of Case Western Reserve University.
- —— (1981). "Politics, power, prevention, and social change". In Joffe, Justin M.; Albee, George W. (eds.). Prevention through political action and social change. Hanover: University Press of New England. ISBN 0-87451-187-9.

=== Miscellaneous ===
- Albee, George W. (1959). Mental health manpower trends: A report to the staff director, Jack R. Ewalt. New York: Basic Books.
- Albee, George W.; Gullotta, Thomas P., eds. (1997). Primary prevention works Vol. 6 Issues in children's and families' lives. Thousand Oaks, California: Sage Publications. ISBN 0-7619-0467-0.
- —— (1994). Preface. The morals and politics of psychology Psychological discourse and the status quo. By Prilleltensky, Isaac. Albany, New York: State University of New York Press. ISBN 0-7914-2037-X.
