= Arthur Gask =

English-born writer and dentist

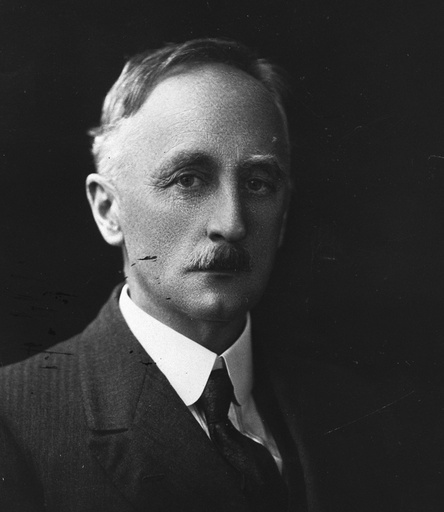
- Arthur Gask, c. 1925
- Born: Arthur Cecil Gask; 10 July 1869; St Marylebone, London, United Kingdom
- Died: 25 June 1951 (aged 81); Adelaide, Australia
- Occupations: Author, dentist
- Writing career
- Genre: Crime fiction
- Notable work: Gilbert Larose series

Arthur Cecil Gask (10 July 1869 – 25 June 1951) was an English dentist and novelist. He is one of the earliest authors of Australian-based crime fiction.

== Early life ==
Gask was born on 10 July 1869 at St Marylebone, London, fourth of five children of Charles Gask, merchant, and his wife Fanny, née Edis.

Gask, accompanied by his second wife, their two sons, and by a daughter of his first marriage, emigrated to Adelaide, South Australia in 1920, where he set up practice as a dentist. He was among the first in the city to carry out extractions with gas.

== Career ==
He began writing crime fiction while waiting for his patients and in 1921 paid for the publication of his first novel, The Secret of the Sandhills, which was an immediate success, which he partly attributed to generous reviews by S. Talbot Smith.

Over a period of thirty years Gask wrote over thirty books as well as contributing short stories to The Mail in Adelaide. Most of his novels described the activities of a Sydney detective, Gilbert Larose, in solving crimes. Gask's work was translated into several European languages, serialised in newspapers and broadcast on radio. He also wrote short stories.

H. G. Wells, an admirer of Gask's work, corresponded with Gask. Wells regarded The Vengeance of Larose (1939) as Gask's "best piece of story-telling...It kept me up till half-past one."

Bertrand Russell, also an admiring reader, called to see Gask at Gask's home in Walkerville, an Adelaide suburb, when he was in Adelaide in August 1950. Gask was reported to have been delighted when, within a few hours after his arrival in Adelaide, Lord Russell called in and spent about an hour and a half with him. Russell confided that he was a reader of Mr. Gask's books in England, and said that now they were so near to each other he felt he really must make his acquaintance. Lord Russell was 78 at the time and Arthur Gask was 81.

Gask's sister, Lilian Gask, was also a writer.

When nearly 80, Gask was still turning out two 80,000-words novels a year, and was reported to have got out of bed to write 23 pages and complete his final novel, Crime After Crime. (Note: This novel was titled Crime Upon Crime on publication.)

Arthur Gask died on 25 June 1951, in an Adelaide private hospital.

== Bibliography ==
Gilbert Larose series

- Cloud the Smiter, 1926
- The Dark Highway, 1928
- The Lonely House, 1929
- The Shadow of Larose, 1930
- The House on the Island, 1931
- Gentlemen of Crime, 1932
- The Hidden Door, 1934
- The Judgment of Larose, 1934
- The Poisoned Goblet, 1935
- The Hangman's Knot, 1936
- The Master Spy, 1937
- The Night of the Storm, 1937
- The Grave-Digger of Monks Arden, 1938
- The Fall of a Dictator, 1939
- The Vengeance of Larose, 1939
- The House on the Fens, 1940
- The Tragedy of the Silver Moon, 1940
- The Beachy Head Murder, 1941
- His Prey Was Man, 1942
- The Mystery of Fell Castle, 1944
- The Man of Death, 1946
- The Dark Mill Stream, 1947
- The Unfolding Years, 1947
- The House with the High Wall, 1948
- The Storm Breaks, 1949
- The Silent Dead, 1950
- The Vaults of Blackarden Castle, 1950
- Marauders by Night, 1951
- Night and Fog, 1951
- Crime Upon Crime, 1952 (Posthumous)

Other Novels

- The Secret of the Sandhills, 1921
- The Red Paste Murders (US Title: Murder in the Night), 1923
- The Secret of the Garden, 1924
- The Jest of Life, 1936

Short Stories

- The Martyr on the Land, (1935)
- The Passion Years, (1936)
- The Destroyer, 1939
- The Will, (1944)
- Buggy's Babies, (1944)
- Ghosts, (1944)
- Seedtime and Harvest, (1944)
- The Amazing Adventure of Marmaduke, (1944)
- The Lottery Ticket, (1944)
- The Mark of Honor, (1944)
- The Hatton Garden Crime, (1945)
- The Way of Chance, (1945)
- Black Market, (1945)
- The Bishop's Dilemma, (1948)
