= Frances Jenkins Olcott =

American writer (1872–1963)

- Born: 1872; Paris, France
- Died: 1963 (aged 90–91); New York City, U.S.
- Education: New York State Library School
- Occupations: Librarian; author; educator
- Writing career
- Genres: Children's literature, folklore, library science
- Subjects: Library education, storytelling

Frances Jenkins Olcott (1872 – 29 March 1963) was the first head librarian of the children's department of the Carnegie Library of Pittsburgh in 1898. She also wrote many children's books and books for those in the profession of providing library service to children and youth.

== Early life ==
Olcott was born in 1872 in Paris, France near the Garden of the Batignolles. She later lived in Albany, New York at both her parents' and grandmother's houses; this was followed by years in the country suburbs of Albany where she was tutored by her parents who provided her with a formative education.

Olcott's father, Franklin Olcott, born in America, but educated in Göttingen and Würzburg in Germany, worked in the American Consular Service. He tutored her in German and the classics. Her mother, Julia Olcott, translated children's stories from French. According to Olcott, her father's strong vocabulary, love for poetry, and researcher's mind and her mother's fine critical powers, delicate feelings for words, and eager mind, helped to develop her intellectual skills and analytical abilities and had a strong influence on her writing. Olcott mentions the importance that her religious influences as a child had upon her writing as well. Her grandmother's formal and dignified religious influence was present alongside her parents’ Bible readings and daily prayers.

Olcott earned her high school certificate through Regents Examinations before taking entrance examinations for the New York State Library School where she graduated in 1896.

== Career ==
=== Librarian ===
Olcott was an assistant librarian of the Brooklyn Public Library from 1897 to 1898. She then became the first librarian to develop and head the Children's Department at Carnegie Library of Pittsburgh and to organize a formal training program known as The Training School for Children's Librarians in 1900. Her children's department was a laboratory where she and her staff tested methods, evolved standards, and worked out problems regarding reading engagement, content selection, and material organization. Her team's results were published and shared with other libraries and schools; her educationally minded staff with two expert bibliographers helped eventually create what became her Carnegie-supported Training School for Children's Librarians. This program became a part of the Carnegie Institute of Technology and was eventually moved to the University of Pittsburgh as the Graduate School of Library and Information Sciences.

Olcott started outreach programs to bring books into homes, schools, detention centers, and beyond. Her efforts helped a large immigrant population at the time learn how to adapt to a new country. She promoted the idea of having home libraries for children, and she and her colleagues would set up a reading hour where groups of children would meet in a home in the community to be read to by the librarians.

=== Writer ===
In 1911 Olcott left both Pittsburgh and her position of librarian and moved back to New York to write books for children, and books on how to be an effective children's librarian. She wrote and edited more than 24 volumes, which sold in her lifetime for more than a half million dollars.

Olcott was asked to write the section "Library Works with Children" for the American Library Association 1914 Manual of Library Economy.

== Death ==
Olcott died on 29 March 1963 in a nursing home on Amsterdam Avenue, New York City.

== Works ==
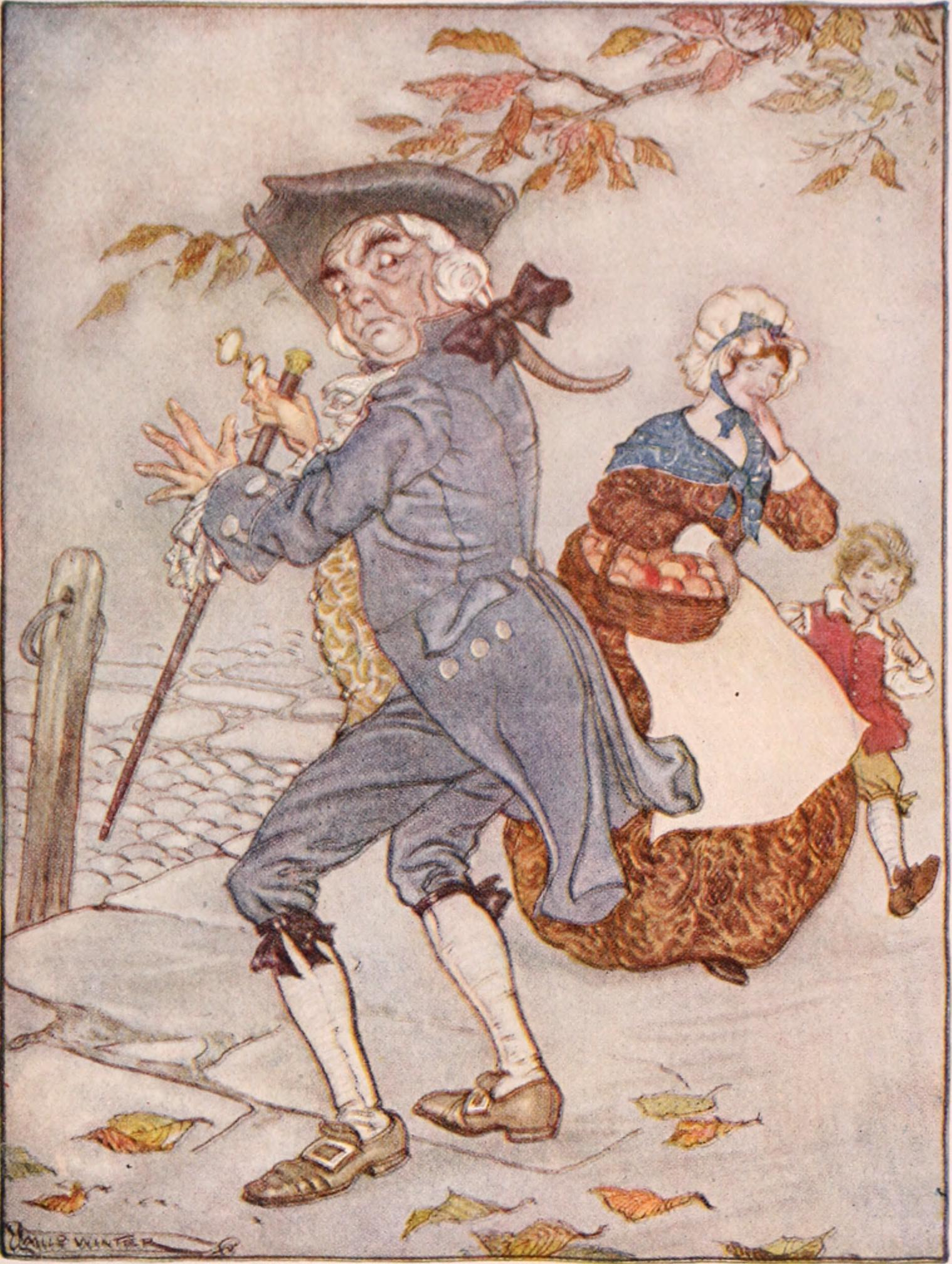
Illustration from Story-telling ballads, selected and arranged for story-telling and reading aloud and for the boys' and girls' own reading (1920)

- 1898 "Fairy Tales for Children", bibliography
- 1905 "Rational Library Work and the Preparation for It"
- 1909 "Story Telling: A Public Library Method"
- 1910 "The Public Library: A Social Force in Pittsburgh"
- 1912 The Children's Reading
- 1913 The Arabian Nights' Entertainments, translated by Edward William Lane; selected, ed., and arranged by Olcott; illustrated by Monro S. Orr
- 1913 Story-telling Poems
- 1914 Good Stories for Great Holidays
- 1914 "Library Work with Children", American Library Association
- 1915 More Tales from the Arabian Nights, transl. Lane, ed. Olcott, illus. Willy Pogány
- 1915 The Jolly Book for Boys and Girls, eds. Olcott and Amena Pendleton, illus. Amy M. Sacker
- 1917 Tales of the Persian Genii, illus. Willy Pogány
- 1917 The Red Indian Fairy Book, illus. Frederick Richardson
- 1918 The Book of Elves and Fairies, illus. Milo Winter (Note: The 1918, 1919, and 1920 books illustrated by Milo Winter are anthologies published by Houghton Mifflin. Their title pages display longer titles, each of which continues and concludes "for Story-telling and Reading Aloud and for the Children's Own Reading".)
- 1919 The Wonder Garden: Nature Myths and Tales from All the World Over, illus. Milo Winter
- 1920 Story-telling Ballads, Selected and Arranged, illus. Milo Winter
- 1922 Grimm's Fairy Tales, illus. Rie Cramer
- 1922 Good Stories for Great Birthdays
- 1922 Stories about George Washington: with a selection of famous poems
- 1925 Wonder Tales from China Seas, illus. Dugald Stewart Walker
- 1926 Wonder Tales from Windmill Lands, illus. Herman Rosse
- 1927 Wonder Tales from Pirate Isles, illus. Herman Rosse
- 1928 Wonder Tales from Baltic Wizards, illus. Victor G. Candell
- 1929 Wonder Tales from Fairy Isles, illus. Constance Whittemore
- 1930 Wonder Tales from Goblin Hills, illus. Harold Sichel, OCLC 1652194
