= Hamaguchi Goryō =

Japanese businessman (1819–1885)

Hamaguchi Goryō 濱口 梧陵
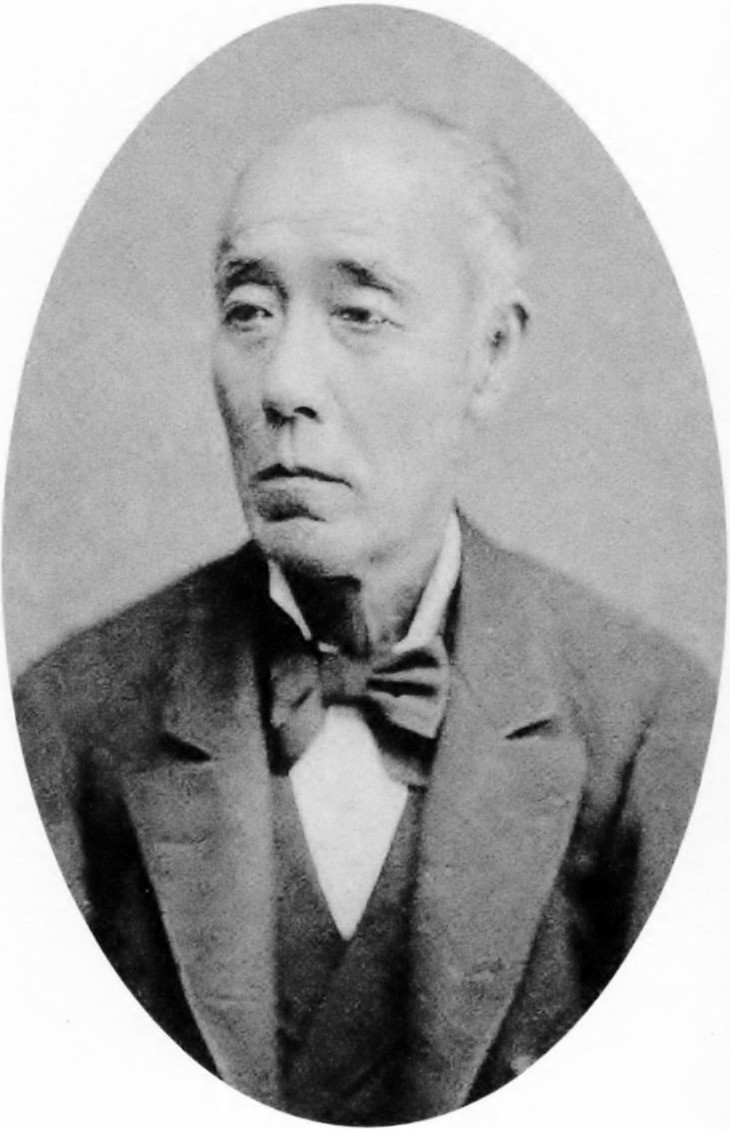
- Hamaguchi Goryō
- Born: May 15, 1819; Yuasa, Kii Province, Japan
- Died: April 21, 1885 (aged 64); New York, New York, United States
- Occupations: Entrepreneur, Philanthropist, Politician

Hamaguchi Goryō (濱口 梧陵; June 15, 1819 – April 21, 1885) was a village headman in Hiro, Kii Province (current Hirogawa, Wakayama) noted for his role in saving villagers from a tsunami during the 1854 Ansei-Nankai earthquake. In the Meiji period, he became an entrepreneur, the seventh owner of Yamasa, the noted soy sauce brewer, philanthropist and politician.

== Biography ==
=== Early history ===
Hamaguchi Goryō was born to a cadet branch of the Hamaguchi family in what is now Yuasa, Wakayama. The Hamaguchi family were soy sauce brewers and merchants, and had operations in both Shimosa and Kii Province. At the age of 12, he was adopted by the main family, which was based at what is now Chōshi, Chiba, where he relocated. In October 1839, he married a daughter of Ikenaga Umetaro in Yuasa at the age of 20. After staying in Hiro-mura for another six months, he returned to Chōshi via Edo in the following spring. By that time, he had already mastered the techniques of martial arts, especially kendo. In addition, he was very good at composing and writing poems.

As a youth, he was interested in western medicine and natural history and during the Bakumatsu period, he volunteered to the Tokugawa shogunate to be sent abroad for training, but was not accepted. At the age of 30, he returned to his native Kii Province and in 1852, opened a private academy for the training of commoner youths in trades. This academy was the forerunner of the current Wakayama Prefectural Taikyu High School. In 1854, he inherited the position of family head as the 7th generation Hamaguchi Goryō.

=== The Ansei-Nankai earthquake and aftermath ===
In the hours after the 1854 Ansei-Nankai earthquake, Hamaguchi Goryō recognized the danger to the village posed by a tsunami and urged the villagers to evacuate to a nearby hill containing the Hiro Hachiman Shrine. Since it was night, he ordered that the stacked sheaves of rice, which were drying after the recent harvest, be set on fire to guide the villagers to safety. As a result, more than 90 percent of the villagers escaped the tsunami. The story was quickly popularized by Inamura no Hi: The Burning Rice Fields by Tsunezo Nakai (translated and published in English by Sara Cone Bryant) and Lafcadio Hearn's Gleanings in Buddha-Fields (1897), with some elaborations, and the account of his heroism became required reading in Japanese textbooks.

After the disaster, Hamaguchi Goryō worked to restore the damaged bridge and built a huge seawall, the Hiromura Embankment, over a four-year period. This large-scale civil engineering work was intended not only for disaster prevention, but was also to provide employment for the villagers who had lost everything due to the tsunami. The cost of the 600 meters long, 20 meters wide and 5 meters high embankment was the equivalent of 4667 ryō and was paid for by Hamaguchi and earned him the sobriquet of "a living god". Some 88 years later, this embankment protected Hirogawa from a tsunami from the 1946 Nankai earthquake.

=== Political career ===
In 1868, despite his commoner status, Hamaguchi was appointed a magistrate (bugyō) of Kishū Domain and a professor at the domain academy. He was asked to lead efforts to reform and modernize the domain's economy. Following the Meiji restoration, in 1871 he was asked by Okubo Toshimichi to head the Ekiteishi (駅逓司), a department set up by the Meiji government to manage post stations, but as the department overlapped that of the Bureau of Posts, the position was abolished after only a few weeks. In 1880, he became the first chairman of the Wakayama Prefectural Assembly. In preparation for the opening of the Imperial Diet, he formed the Kikuni Doyukai a local proto-political party. In 1885, he went on a world trip, which had been his dream since his youth. He died in New York, in the United States. His funeral was held on June 15, 1885, in Hirogawa and more than 4,000 people gathered to pay their final respects.

== Timeline ==
Year	Japanese Year	Event
1820	Bunsei 3	Born on June 15 in Hiro-mura. Childhood name, Shichita
1831	Tenpō 2	Adopted into the head family in September and renamed Gita
1839	Tenpō 10	Married to Matsu in November
1851	Kaei 4	Founded Sugidan (Self Defense Group) in Hiro-Mura
1852	Kaei 5	Established a private academy (later called "Taikyu-sha") in Ta-machi
1853	Kaei 6	Succeeded the head family to become Gihei VII in March
1854	Ansei 1	The tsunami caused by the Ansei earthquake struck the village in November
1855	Ansei 2	Commenced building the Hiro-mura Seawall in February
1858	Ansei 5	Completion of the Hiro-mura Seawall in December
1859	Ansei 6	Contributed 300 Ryo (gold piece) for the reconstruction of the Vaccination Center
1868	Meiji 1	Selected as Commissioner of Finance in Kishu Domain in January
1869	Meiji 2	Appointed the president of Gakushu-kan for Ohiroma-seki (a feudal position) in February
1870	Meiji 1	Appointed Gondai-Sanji (Counselor) of Kishu Domain in December
1871	Meiji 4	Appointed Ekitei-no-kami in August
1879	Meiji 12	Elected the first chairman of the Wakayama Prefectural Assembly
1882	Meiji 15	Organized the Kinokuni Doyukai (Association)
1884	Meiji 17	Left Yokohama in May and arrived in the United States
1885	Meiji 18	Died on April 21 in New York, the United States of America

== See also ==
- Lafcadio Hearn
- Yamasa
- The Fire of Rice Sheaves
