= Helen Mary Jacobs =

British children's illustrator (1888 – 1970)

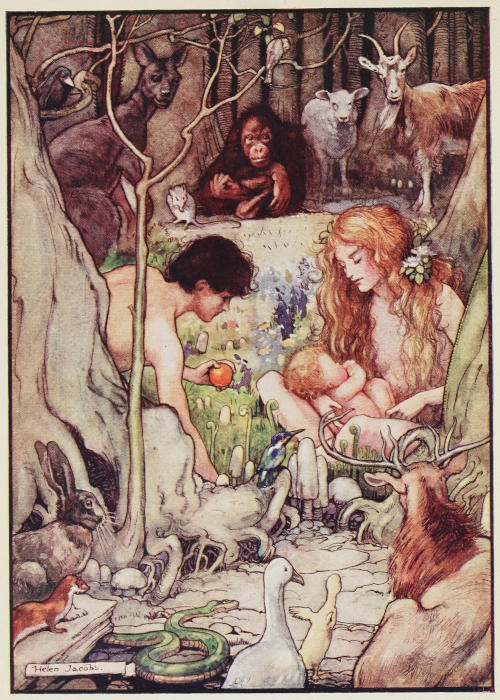
1921 watercolour by Helen Jacobs for a children's book frontispiece

Helen Mary Jacobs (10 October 1888 – 15 December 1970) was an English artist and illustrator known for her work on comic strips for children's annuals, especially fairy art. She also illustrated children's novels and educational school books.

== Early life ==
Jacobs was born 10 October 1888 in Ilford, Essex, the youngest of five children of wharf manager William Jacobs and his second wife Ellen, née Flory. She had four half-siblings by her father's previous marriage, including short story writer W. W. Jacobs. She grew up in Stoke Newington, London, and studied at the art school of West Ham Municipal College under watercolourist Arthur Legge.

From 1910, she began exhibiting watercolours at Royal Academy of Arts and Royal Institute of Painters in Water-Colours exhibitions. She made entomological drawings for Charles Rothschild.

== Illustration ==
Jacobs contributed watercolour and pen-and-ink drawings and comic strips to children's annuals and periodicals, including The Sunday Fairy (later Bubbles), Playbox, Rainbow, Little Folks, and Joy Street.

She was the main illustrator for children's books by Stella Mead, also providing illustrations for other authors including Enid Blyton, Lilian Gask, Ethel McPherson, and Constance M. Martin.

Her "charming" illustrations, Christopher Wood wrote in Fairies in Victorian Art, "sum up the transition of fairy painting into the world of children's books." Her precise, naturalistic style became brighter and bolder when she began illustrating school books later in life, while she was a primary school teacher in Stoke Newington.

She died on 15 December 1970.
