= The King of Ireland's Son =

1916 novel by Padraic Colum

- Author: Padraic Colum
- Illustrator: Willy Pogany
- Language: English
- Genre: Children's novel
- Publication date: 1916
- Publication place: Ireland
- Media type: Print (Hardcover)

The King of Ireland's Son is a children's novel published in Ireland in 1916 written by Padraic Colum, and illustrated by Willy Pogany. It is the story of the eldest of the King of Ireland's sons, and his adventures winning and then finding Fedelma, the Enchanter's Daughter, who after being won is kidnapped from him by the King of the Land of Mist.

The work is based in Irish folklore, described as "his great synthesis of fireside tales", and "a marvellous compendium of Irish folktales re-told". The 1916 edition published by Henry Holt is interleaved with plates of illustrations in full colour.

== Stories ==
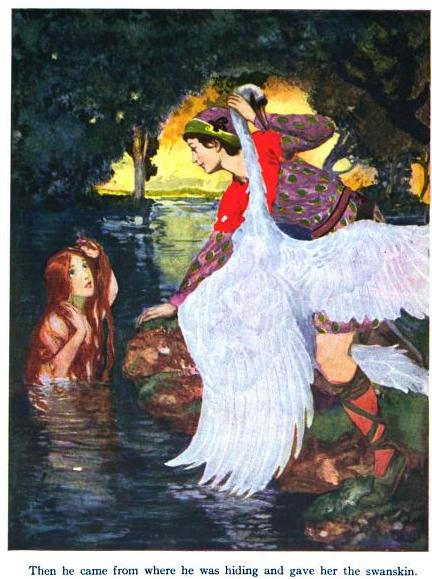
The King of Ireland's oldest son returns the swanskin to Fedelma, the Enchanter's Daughter. Illustration by Willy Pogány for Padraic Colum's The King of Ireland's Son (1916).

This work is considered a classic of Irish children's literature, featuring a collection of interwoven magical stories that form a lengthy and complex narrative.

When the careless King of Ireland's son goes out,

His hound at his heel,
His hawk on his wrist,
A brave steed to carry him whither he list,
The blue sky above him,
The green grass below him

He meets an eccentric old man who invites him to a game of chess where the winner would choose the stakes.

In the first segment, Fedelma, the Enchanter's Daughter, the oldest son of the King of Ireland loses a wager against his father's enemy and should find him in a year and a day's time. He is advised by a talking eagle to spy on three swan maidens that will descend on a lake. They are the daughters of the Enchanter of the Black Back-Lands, the wizard the prince is looking for. The prince is instructed to hide the swanskin of the swan with a green ribbon, who is Fedelma, the Enchanter's youngest daughter. After arriving at the Enchanter's kingdom, he promises marriage to Fedelma, resisting her sisters', Aefa and Gilveen, advances, and is forced to fulfill three difficult tasks to the Enchanter.

In the chapter The Unique Tale, the Spae-Woman tells the heroes the following story: a queen wishes for a blue-eyed, blonde-haired daughter, and carelessly wishes her sons to "go with the wild geese". As soon as the daughter (named Sheen, 'Storm') is born, the seven princes change into gray wild geese and fly away from the castle. It is later revealed that Sheen changed her name to Caintigern and became Queen when she married the King of Ireland, who, in turn, is the father of two of the main characters: the King of Ireland's Son and Gilly of the Goatskin (Gilla Na Chreck An Gour). The seven wild geese are, thus, their uncles.

== Reception ==
Although the book was written in America in the years before 1916, Colum was a close friend and colleague of some of those who led the Easter Rising. The King of Ireland's Son was the ultimate calling-up of Irish mythology and legend, and, paired with James Stephens' Irish Fairy Tales, made many happy hours for children curled up before glowing turf fires to read by the light of Tilley lamps in the long winter evenings of the new Ireland.

== Adaptations ==
Another evolution from the original folktale was written by Brendan Behan, published in Brendan Behan's Island, 1962, pp. 136–141.
