= Patten Wilson =

British magazine and book illustrator

- Born: 23 March 1869; Shropshire, England
- Died: 22 January 1934 (aged 64); London, England

Patten Wilson (1869 - 1934) was a British magazine and book illustrator.

Patten Wilson, the son of a clergyman, was born on 23 March 1869 in Shropshire. His brother was the architect and designer Henry Wilson (1864-1934), who ran an extensive business as a sculptor and metalworker, as well as teaching metalwork at the Royal College of Art and at the Central School of Arts and Crafts in London.

At age 19, Wilson dropped out of Kidderminster School of Art, and returned home to pursue a course of self-education, studying the work of Albrecht Dürer (1471-1528). In addition, he made studies of animals and plants. His early designs were "spirited and full of invention". Taking a number of jobs, including secretary to the managing director of the Liverpool gymnasium, he continued his artistic endeavors. His earliest published drawings appeared in the magazine Recreation.

In 1894 Wilson was introduced to the publisher John Lane, who gave him a commission to design and illustrate Miracle Plays by Katherine Tynan Hinkson in a series of black-and-white line drawings. Subsequently he was invited as a contributor to the newly launched "The Yellow Book', which ultimately published thirteen of his drawings. His first contribution, titled “Rustem Firing the First Shot”, appeared in January 1895, Volume 4, and was inspired by a prose translation of the original epic poem, Rustem and Sohrab by Matthew Arnold. He contributed two more illustrations to the poem in later volumes. Between 1895 and 1897, Wilson also provided title-illustrations for a number of volumes published by The Bodley Head. He contributed an Arthurian illustration to The Builder Magazine in 1896 and several illustrations to The Architectural Review in 1898. That same year, he was commissioned to provide illustrations for a volume of poetry by Samuel Taylor Coleridge. In 1901 he was asked by J. M. Dent to create twenty illustrations for The Gospel Story of Jesus Christ, along with three other books for that publisher, including another one hundred illustrations for A Child's History of England by Charles Dickens. After 1905, he abandoned line drawings in favour of colour and half-tone, and moved into the fields of natural history and mythology.

In April 1900, Wilson married Alice Harding. He died on 22 January 1934 in Chelsea, London.

== Books illustrated ==
- J. S. Fletcher: Life in Arcadia (Ballantyne, Hanson, 1896)
- J. S. Fletcher: God’s Failures (Lane, 1897)
- Walter C. Rhodes: A Houseful of Rebels (Constable, 1897)
- Samuel Taylor Coleridge: Selections From Coleridge (1898)
- Ida W. Hutchison: The Gospel Story of Jesus (Hutchinson, 1901)
- T. W. H. Crossland: The Coronation Dumpy Book (Grant Richards, 1902)
- Catherine Gasgoine Hartley: Stories of Early British Heroes (Dent, 1902)
- Charles Dickens: A Child’s History of England (Dent, 1903)
- The Sunday Dumpy Book For Children (Grant Richards, 1903)
- Patten Wilson: Daniel In The Lions’ Den (Sunday Dumpy Books For Children No 1) (Grant Richards, 1903)
- Augusta Klein; Anotole: A Romance of The Sea (Dent, 1904)
- Vivien Phillipps: A Trip To Santa Claus Land, or Ruth’s Christmas Eve (Gay & bird, 1905)
- Patten Wilson: Nature Round The House (Longmans, 1907)
- Marianne Kirlew: Her Path To The Stars (Gay & Bird, 1907)
- Charles John Parrish: Animal Artisans and Other Studies of Birds and Beasts (Longmans, 1907)
- William Samuel Furneaux; Field and Woodland Plants (Longmans, 1909)
- Maude I. Ebbutt; Hero-Myths and Legends of The British Race (Harrap, 1910)
- Homer: Odyssey (Harrap, 1911)
- Sara Cone Bryant: Stories To Tell To Children (Harrap, 1912)
- Lilian Gask: Legends of Our Little Brothers: Fairy Lore of Bird and Beast (Harrap, 1912)
- Nathaniel Hawthorne: The Golden Touch (The Gorgon’s Head) (Wonder Book) (Constable, 1912)
- Nathaniel Hawthorne: The Three Golden Apples (Constable, 1912)
- Agnes Herbert: The Moose (Black, 1913)
- Maud D. Haviland: Wild Life On The Wing (Black, 1913)
- Lilian Gask: In The “Once Upon A Time” – A Fairy Tale of Science (Harrap, 1913)
- Joseph Henry Harris: Phyllis In Piskie Land: A Tale of Cornwall inspired by Lewis
- Lewis Carroll: Carroll’s Wonderland (David Nutt, 1913)
- Patten Wilson: Book of The Zoo: An Animal Book For Old and Young (1913)
- Frederick John Snell: Boys Who Became Famous (Harrap, 1914)
- Lilian Gask: True Stories About Horses (Harrap, 1914)
- Samuel Cox; The Signs of the Planets: A Book of Birthday Lore (Arthur Gray, 1932)
- Samuel Cox: What The Stars Predict For You: A Book of Birthday Lore (Arthur Gray, 1933)

== Sources ==
- Manton, Cyndy. Henry Wilson: Practical Idealist. Cambridge: Lutterworth Press, 2009.
- Sparrow, Walter Shaw. “Some Drawings by Patten Wilson.” The Studio 23 (Aug 1901): 186-196.
- White, Gleeson. “Decorative Illustration with Especial Reference to the Work of Mr. Patten Wilson.” The Studio 3 (Aug. 1894): 182-85.
- Williamson, George C., “The Decorative Illustrations of Patten Wilson.” The Artist: An Illustrated Monthly Record of Arts, Crafts and Industries 21, (Jan 1898): 17-22.
