= Adventures of Gilla Na Chreck An Gour =

Irish fairy tale

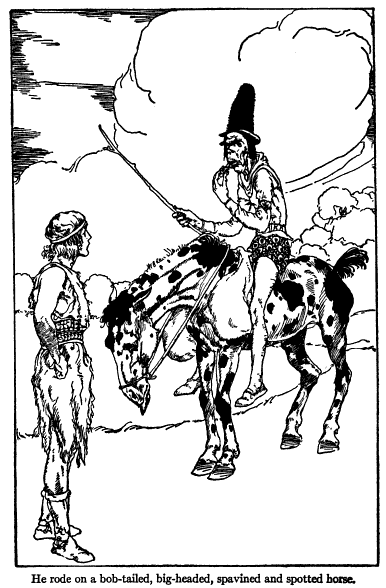
- Gilla Na Chreck An Gour (The Fellow in the Goatskin) meets a man on the road. Illustration by Willy Pogány (1916).

Folk tale
- Name: Adventures of Gilla Na Chreck An Gour
- Also known as: The Lad With the Goat-skin
- Aarne–Thompson grouping: ATU 650 (Strong John)
- Region: Ireland
- Published in: Legendary Fictions of the Irish Celts by Patrick Kennedy (1866); The Irish Fairy Book by Alfred Perceval Graves (1909)
- Related: Strong Hans

Adventures of Gilla Na Chreck An Gour ("The Fellow in the Goatskin") is an Irish fairy tale collected by folklorist Patrick Kennedy and published in Legendary Fictions of the Irish Celts (1866). The tale was also published by Irish poet Alfred Perceval Graves in his Irish Fairy Book (1909). Joseph Jacobs published the tale as The Lad with the Goat-Skin in his Celtic Fairy Tales.

The tale is classified in the Aarne-Thompson-Uther Index as ATU 650A, "Strong John".

== Summary ==
In Enniscorthy, a woman is so poor that she gives her son (an ash-lad), who lives around the hearth, a goat-skin to wrap around the waist. When he is "six foot high" and nineteen years old, his mother sends him to the forest to fetch some "bresna". He finds a nine-foot-high giant in the woods and spares his life, gaining a club from the giant. When sent again, he meets a two-headed giant who gives Tom (Gilla's name) a magical fife that makes people dance, and a three headed giant who gives him a "green ointment" that grants immunity against burns, wounds and scalding.

Later, he walks down the road and reaches a city. There he learns that the King of Dublin's daughter hasn't laughed in seven years, and intends to make her laugh three times. The second time, Tom uses the magical fife to command a terrible wolf to dance. On that same night, the king tells Tom he needs a powerful flail to vanquish the Danes. So Tom "travelled and travelled till he came in sight of the walls of hell" and talked to the devils to loan him the flail.

His rival at court, a fellow named Redhead, tries to wield the flail and fails, which creates a scene so comical that the princess bursts out laughing. The princess accepts Tom as her husband. The Danes, eventually, give up their plans of invading Dublin, so frightened they were of rumors of the flail.

== Analysis ==
=== Tale type ===
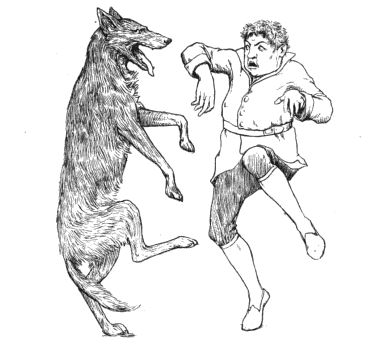
The wolf and the courtier dance to the tune of the fife. Illustration by John D. Batten for Joseph Jacobs's Celtic Fairy Tales (1892).

This tale is classified in the Aarne-Thompson-Uther Index as ATU 650A. These types refer to stories where the hero shows superhuman strength as he matures. Sometimes the hero is the fruit of the union between a human and an otherworldly character. In addition, some stories of type 650A feature an episode of type ATU 1000, "Anger Bargain (Bargain not to become angry)".

This tale, in particular, also shows an episode of the tale type ATU 571, "All Stick Together" or "Making the Princess Laugh".

Folklorists Johannes Bolte and Jiri Polivka, in their commentaries to the Grimm fairy tales, listed this tale as connected to Grimm's fairy tale The Young Giant, another story of type ATU 650.

=== Motifs ===
==== The name of the hero ====
Folklorist Jeremiah Curtin commented that the name Gilla na Grakin (Gilla na g-croicean) means "the fellow (or youth) of the skins" and refers to a servant boy. The name also appears as component of many Irish names. In the same vein, Joseph Jacobs noted that the "Gilla" character (or "The Lad with the Skin Coverings") was a popular figure in Celtic tales.

As pointed by James MacDougall, the name could also be written in Gaelic as Gille nan Cochla-craicinn, Gille nan Cochulla-craicinn or Gille nan Cochuill-chraicinn, all meaning "The Lad of the Skin-Coverings" or "The Lad of the Skinny Husks". These "skinny husks" could mean either the skin of an animal that grants a magical transformation, or simply garments made of animal skin.

Scholarship on Celtic studies states that the name also appears as the identity assumed by hero Ceudach or Céadach, the protagonist of "the most popular of all Fenian folk-tales". In variations of the legend, either Ceudach is given this name by the king or by his wife, or he uses this moniker to conceal his true identity.

== Variants ==
=== Europe ===
In a Gaelic story, Scéal Ghiolla na gCochall Craicionn ("The Story of the Lad in Goat Skins"), published in 1906 by British linguist Edmund Crosby Quiggin, two men (Céadach mac ríogh na dTulach and Lonndubh mac ríogh na Dreólainne), apprentices of blacksmith Gaibhdín Gabhna dispute the hand of the maiden Scaith Shioda ní Mhanannán. After the maiden decides who shall be her future husband (by his guessing which of two doors she entered and following after), Céadach leaves his hometown and adventures in the woods, dressed only in animal skins. One day, the hunting party of prince Fionn mac Cumhaill find him cooking some game and alert the prince. Ceádach is brought to the king's presence and receives the name Ghiolla na gCochall Craicionn. The tale was also published by Jeremiah Curtin in 1890 with the name Gilla na Grakin and Fin MacCumhail, the blacksmith's apprentices were named Césa MacRi na Tulach and Lun Dubh MacSmola, and the maiden Scéhide ni Wánanan.

In a Sutherlandshire story collected by Scottish novelist Charlotte Louisa Hawkins Dempster, The Romance of Gille na Cochlan Crackenach, the Righ na Lirriach, a married king, is abducted by a Ben-ee (a fairy woman) and impregnates her. After twelve months, he is released and returns to his wife, who gave birth to a boy during his captivity. The queen learns the whole story and insists the king bring his other son to live and play with his half-brother. One day, however, an old greybearded man foretold that one boy might kill the other in the future. Trying to avert the dismal fate, the son of the fairy woman, called Fach-Mòhr-mac-Righ-na-Lirriach, leaves the kingdom and goes to the woods. He is then found by another king, Ossian-Righ-na-Faen, king of the Picts. Fach Móhr introduces himself as Gillie-na-Cochlan Crackenach and accompanies King Ossian to work for him. On his further adventures, he finds a vial of a powerful elixir named Flaggan Fiacallach; he is killed but resurrected with the vial, and later returns to his half-brother. Fach-Mòhr/Gillie uses the vial on his ailing brother and both live happily.

In another tale, collected by John Gregorson Campbell, titled Gille nan Cochla Craicionn ("The Lad With the Skin Coverings, or Ceudach, Son of the King of the Colla Men"), Ceudach plays with fellow friends White Dew, Son of the King of Gold, and White Hand, son of the King of France. One day, kicking the ball they had, they hit the workshop of a female silversmith. The woman curses them to "fall back to back in the same battle". Some time later, the trio try their chance at the hand of the daughter of the King of the Iron city, but they expect that White Dew. Sensins the three friends hold, each one, deep affections for her, she proposes a test: the one she shall marry shall follow her through a door she will enter, out of three. Ceadach finds the right door because he "had a knowledge of the 'black art'". The princess and Ceadach marry and he decides to go to Fíonn, wearing a garment made of animal skins (sheep or goat) by his wife, and with a new identity: The One/Lad/Man with the Skin Coverings. It is later revealed, after a series of adventures, that Ceadach is Fíonn's cousin, son of Fíonn's father's brother. An identical, albeit shorter, variant was also published, with the name Ceudach Mac Rígh nan Collach ("Ceudach, Son of the King of the Colla Men").

In another Scottish variant, prince Fionn sends his knights to bring him the mysterious person who was roasting a boar in his lands. The youth is brought to the prince's presence, introduces himself as The Lad of the Skin Covering and says he is looking for a master. Fionn sends the Lad to "The Master of the Field of Glass" to discover why the "Master" hasn't spoken or laughed in seven years, and later on dangerous errands to get rid of him.

=== America ===
Professor Marie Campbell collected an American variant titled Gilly and his Goatskin Clothes. In this tale, a widow was so poor that she had no money to buy her son clothes, so she let him sleep in ashes to keep warm. Some time later, a man gave Gilly a crippled goat that some hunters killed. With the goatskin he made a garment for himself. When he was in the forest to gather some wood, he met three giants in three different occasions: one gave him a fife that makes everyone dance; the second a salve that makes him impervious to physical harm and the third a giant club. Gilly later left for the royal city in order to make the princess laugh, who hadn't in years.

== Adaptations ==
Irish novelist and author Padraic Colum reworked a series of Irish legends in his book The King of Ireland's Son, among them the tale of the Fellow in the Goatskin. In this book, the author interlaced several tale types to weave a complex narrative: Gilly of the Goatskin is actually Flann, the royal son of the King of Ireland and Queen Caintigern. The queen was also named Sheen ('storm') and is the youngest sister of seven princes who were transformed into wild geese. The wise woman revealed Gilly's true origins because of a star-shaped birthmark on his chest - a common motif in fairy tales that indicates the heroes' and heroines' royal heritage.
