= Hiro Hachiman Shrine =

Shinto shrine in Hirogawa, Wakayama Prefecture, Japan

Hiro Hachiman Jinja
- 広八幡神社
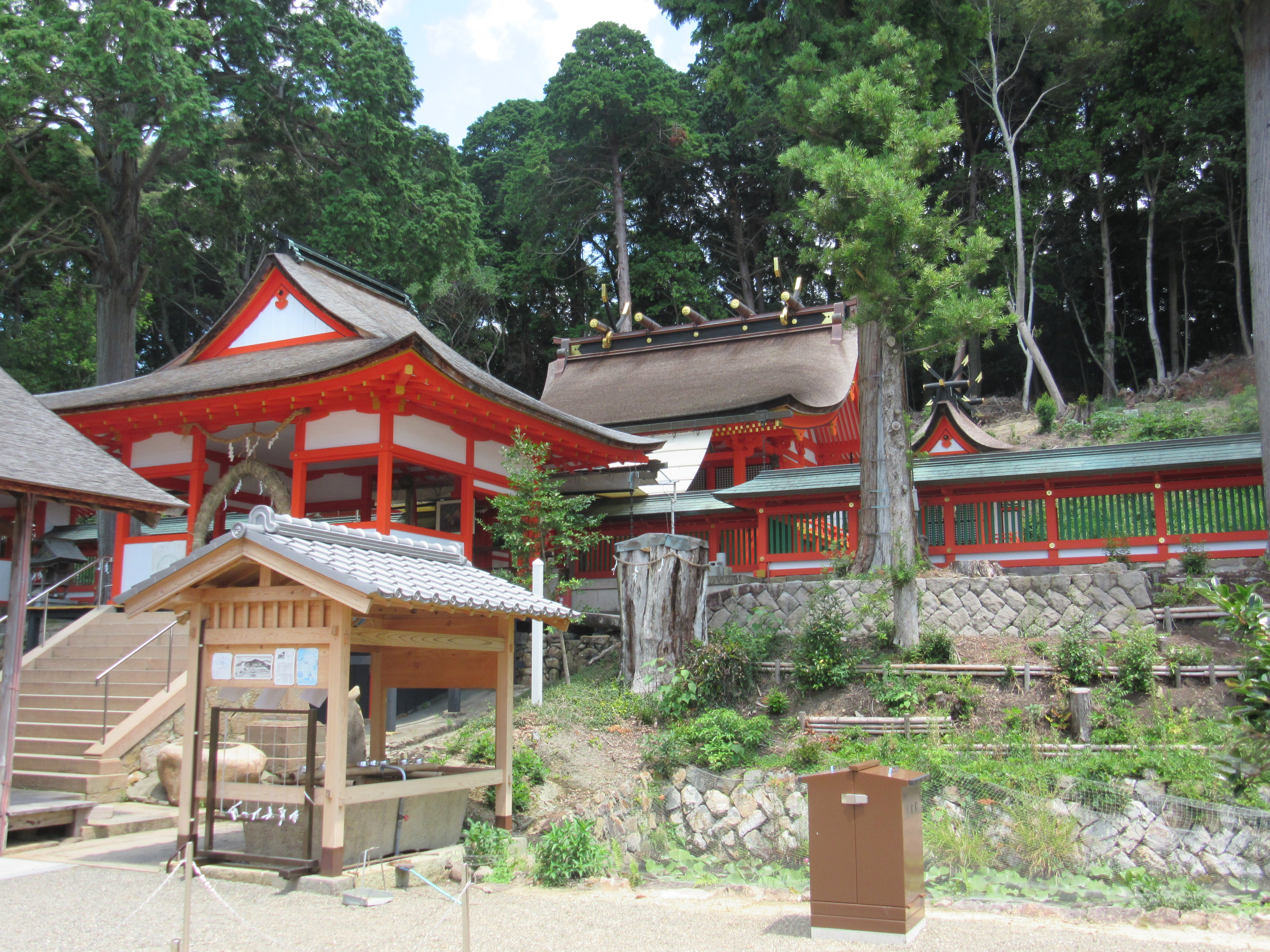
- Hiro Hachiman Jinja

- Hiro Hachiman Jinja Hiro Hachiman Shrine (Japan)

Religion
- Affiliation: Shinto
- Deity: Hachiman
- Festival: October 1

Location
- Location: 206 Kaminakano Hirogawa-cho Arida-gun Wakayama-ken
- Interactive map of Hiro Hachiman Jinja
- Coordinates: 34°01′04″N 135°10′30″E

Architecture
- Founder: c. Emperor Kinmei

Website
- Official website

Hiro Hachiman Jinja (広八幡神社) is a Shinto shrine located in the town of Hirogawa, Wakayama Prefecture, Japan. The shrine is dedicated to the kami Hachiman. It contains a number of structures which are designated as National Important Cultural Properties. The shrine is also known for its monument to local hero Hamaguchi Goryō, who saved local villagers from a tsunami during the 1854 Ansei-Nankai earthquake, as recounted in “A Living God” by Lafcadio Hearn in his Gleanings in Buddha Fields (1897). This monument with an inscription by Katsu Kaishu and calligraphy Iwaya Ichiroku, was designated a National Historic Site in 2015.

== History ==
The history of this shrine is not well documented. Per the Kii-Zoku-Fudok, one of the ancient records of Kii Province, the shrine was originally built in Kawachi Province during the reign of Emperor Kinmei (reigned 539 to 571 AD) and relocated to this location in the Muromachi period. The main shrine is dedicated to the Hachiman triad of Hondawake-no-Mikoto (Emperor Ojin), Tarashinakatsuhiko-no-Mikoto (Emperor Chuai) and Okinagatarashihime-no-Mikoto (Emperor Jingu). Three subsidiary shrines are on the grounds, These are the Wakamiya-sha dedicated to Ohsagi-no-Mikoto (Emperor Nintoku), Kora-sha dedicated to Takenouchi no Sukune and Tenjin-sha dedicated to Sugawara no Michizane.

The shrine was destroyed during Toyotomi Hideyoshi's conquest of Kii Province in 1585, and was rebuilt by Asano Yukinaga after he was assigned the province by Tokugawa Ieyasu. During the rule of the Kii Tokugawa clan, the shrine was supported by Kishū Domain during the Edo period. With the Meiji restoration and the Separation of Shintoism and Buddhism, the various Buddhist-related structures on the grounds of the shrine were destroyed or relocated. These included a Kannon-dō, Shōrō and Tahōtō (which was sent to Mitaki-dera in Hiroshima). The shrine retained its rōmon (two storied gate).

The shrine's dengaku and lion dance performances during its autumn festival has been designated Wakayama Prefecture Intangible Cultural Properties.

== Cultural Properties ==
- Honden, built in 1413, repaired in 1776. National Important Cultural Property (ICP) from 1929
- Haiden, built in 1704, ICP from 1947
- Rōmon, built in 1475, ICP from 1947
- Kora shrine Honden, built in 1502, ICP from 1929
- Tenjin-sha Honden, built in 1652, ICP from 1947
- Wakamiya Shrine Honden, built in 1493, ICP from 1929

== See also ==
- List of Historic Sites of Japan (Wakayama)
