= George Trumbull Ladd =

American philosopher, educator and psychologist (1842–1921)

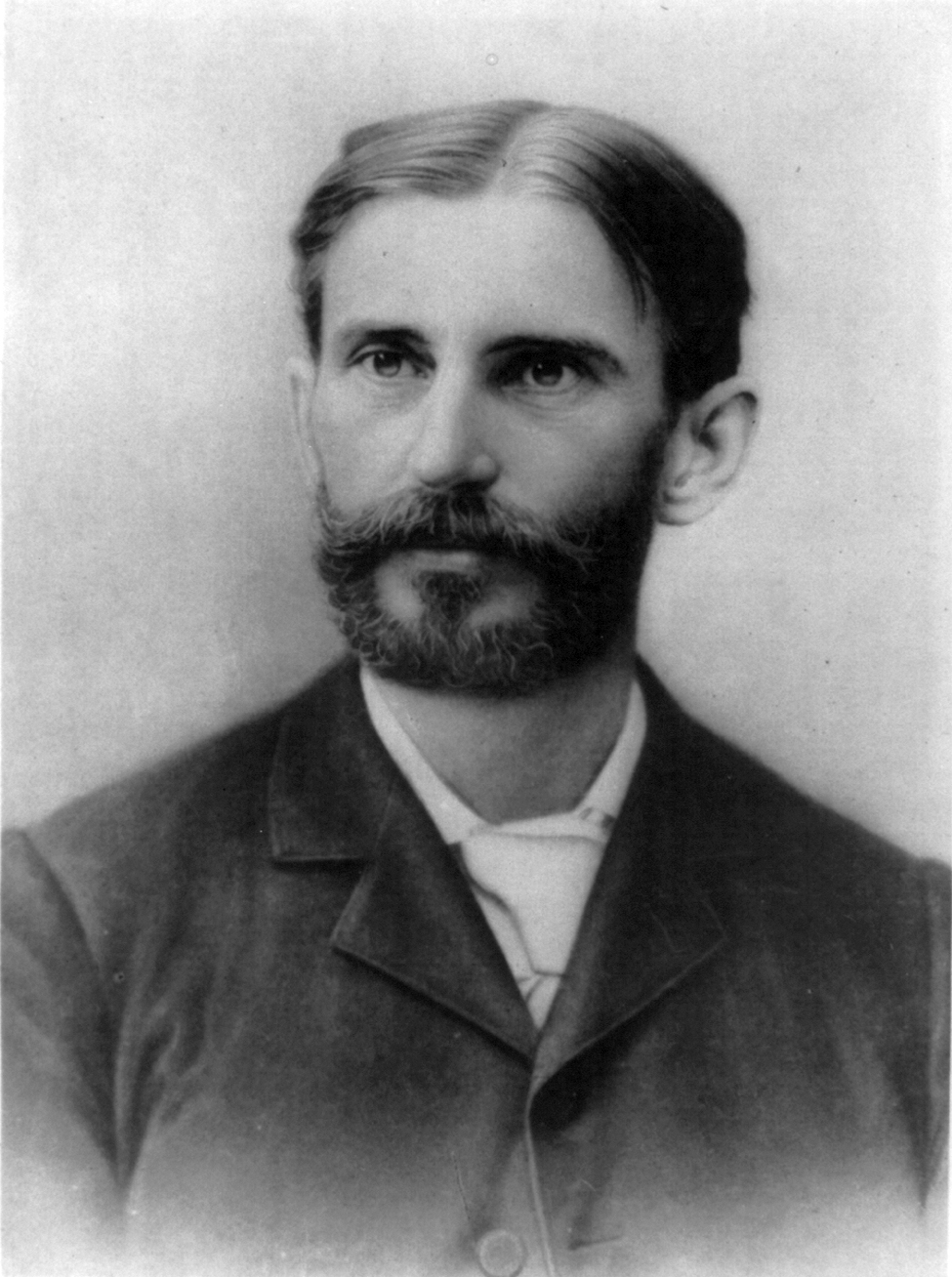
- Ladd in 1898
- Born: January 19, 1842; Painesville, Lake County, Ohio, US
- Died: August 8, 1921 (aged 79); New Haven, Connecticut, US
- Education: Western Reserve College; Andover Theological Seminary
- Occupations: Psychologist, educator and philosopher
- Spouses: Cornelia Ann Tallman; Frances Virginia Stevens
- Children: 4

George Trumbull Ladd (/ˈtrʌmbəl/; January 19, 1842 – August 8, 1921) was an American philosopher, educator and psychologist who, in 1893, became the second President of the American Psychological Association.

Ladd was a vocal advocate for Japanese colonialism, including its colonization of Korea, and described Korean people as primitive and uncivilized.

== Biography ==
=== Early life and ancestors ===
Ladd was born in Painesville, Ohio, on January 19, 1842, the son of Silas Trumbull Ladd and Elizabeth Williams.

He was a grandson of Jesse Ladd and Ruby Brewster, who were among the original pioneers in Madison, Lake County, Ohio. Ruby was a granddaughter of Oliver Brewster and Martha Wadsworth Brewster, a poet and writer, and one of the earliest American female literary figures.

He was a descendant of Elder William Brewster (c. 1567 – April 10, 1644), the Pilgrim leader and spiritual elder of the Plymouth Colony and a passenger on the Mayflower, and Governor William Bradford (1590–1657) of the Plymouth Colony and a passenger on the Mayflower. He was also a seventh generation direct lineal descendant of Daniel Ladd, Sr. (1613–1693).

=== Education ===
He early gave indications of the studious habits that characterized him through life. When he was eight years old his first savings, two dollars, were spent for a copy of Josephus and Plutarch, while when eighteen years of age he read Kant's Critique of Pure Reason.

Most of his work in preparing for college was done by himself, only a portion of the time being given to the curriculum in the Painesville High School and at the college preparatory school of the Rev. Mr. Brayton in Painesville, Ohio.

He graduated from Western Reserve College in 1864 and from Andover Theological Seminary in 1869. He was ordained to the Congregational ministry on May 26, 1870. The degree of Doctor of Divinity (D.D. or DD, Divinitatis Doctor in Latin) was conferred on him by Western Reserve College in 1879; Yale University that of M.A. in 1881, Western Reserve College that of LL.D. in 1895, and Princeton University that of LL.D. in 1896.

=== Career ===
After graduation, he went into business with his father. His constant studies, however, seemed to turn his steps naturally toward a higher institution of learning, with the result that in 1866 he went to the Andover Theological Seminary.

In 1869, he was installed as the pastor of the Congregational Church in Edinburg, Portage County, Ohio, remaining here until 1871. In 1871 he began to preach at the Spring Street Congregational Church of Milwaukee, Milwaukee County, Wisconsin, leaving in 1879. He was professor of intellectual and moral philosophy at Bowdoin College from 1879 to 1881, and Clark Professor of Metaphysics and Moral Philosophy at Yale University (a professorship that still exists) from 1881 until 1901, when he took charge of the Graduate Department of Philosophy and Psychology. Ladd became professor emeritus in 1905, and retired in 1906.

During 1879 to 1882 he lectured on theology at Andover Theological Seminary, and in 1883 at Harvard University, where from 1895 to 1896 he conducted a graduate seminar in ethics.

Between 1892 and 1899, at the invitation of the government of Japan, he served as a diplomatic adviser and helped the cabinet under Prime Minister Hirobumi Ito (1841–1909) to promote mutual understanding between Japan and the United States.

He lectured at Imperial University in Japan in 1892 and 1899 (when he also visited Indian universities in Calcutta, Bombay and Benares) and again from 1906 to 1907.

The series of lectures he delivered in Japan revolutionized its educational methods; In 1899, Emperor Meiji conferred the Order of the Rising Sun, Gold Rays with Neck Ribbon, which represents the third highest of eight classes associated with the award. Trumbull was again honored in 1907, this time with the Order of the Rising Sun, Gold and Silver Star, which represents the second highest of eight classes. He was the first foreigner to receive the honor in this class. He was a member of the Connecticut Academy of Arts and Sciences.

Trumbull was a vocal advocate for Japan's colonial rule over Korea. After Japan violently repressed the peaceful 1919 March 1st Movement in Korea, Trumbull published a number of articles in which he blamed alleged secret societies in Korea, radicals, and Christian missionaries for starting the protests. He argued that the protestors were deluded, that Koreans were uncivilized and incapable of self-governance, and that Japan was helping them.

He was much influenced by the German philosopher Hermann Lotze, whose Outlines of Philosophy he translated (6 volumes, 1877) and was one of the first to introduce (1879) the study of experimental psychology into America; the Yale psychological laboratory being founded by him during his time there from 1881 to 1901. In 1887, he published Elements of Physiological Psychology, the first American textbook to include a substantial amount of information on the new experimental form of the discipline.

=== Marriage and family ===
He married on December 8, 1869, at Bridgeport, Belmont County, Ohio, Cornelia Ann Tallman, born August 26, 1842, at St. Clairsville, Belmont County, Ohio, and died on October 19, 1893, at North Haven, New Haven County, Connecticut. She was the daughter of Ellen Ryne and John C. Tallman, a well-known banker and business man of Bridgeport, Ohio.

George and Cornelia were the parents of four children:

  - George Tallman Ladd (1871–1943), an industrialist of Pittsburgh, Pennsylvania, and an 1891 graduate of Yale University. He was president and CEO of United Engineering & Foundry Company, the largest U. S. maker of steel mill equipment. The George Tallman Ladd Award, at the Carnegie Institute of Technology is named after him.
  - Dr. Louis Williams Ladd, (1873–1955), was a doctor of internal medicine and professor of clinical microscopy at the Case Western Reserve University School of Medicine. He graduated from Yale University in 1895 earning his Bachelor of Arts degree, and he graduated with an MD from Johns Hopkins University School of Medicine in 1899.
  - Jesse Brewster Ladd, (1876–1882).
  - Elizabeth Tudor Ladd, (1882–1965), married Walter Aldrich Barrett.

He married second, on December 9, 1895, Frances Virginia Stevens, born February 9, 1866, at New York City, the daughter of Dr. George T. Stevens and Harriet Weeks Wadhams. There were no children from the second marriage.

=== Death ===
Ladd died on August 8, 1921, at New Haven, Connecticut. After cremation, half his ashes were buried in Sōji-ji, Tsurumi-ku, Yokohama, Japan, and a monument was erected to him. The remaining ashes were interred under a monument of the rising sun in Grove Street Cemetery, New Haven, Connecticut. Case Western Reserve University conferred his name on its post of 'Distinguished Professor of Psychology', to which George Albee was appointed in 1958.

== Publications ==
- The Principles of Church Polity (1882)
- The Doctrine of Sacred Scripture (1884)
- What is the Bible? (1888)
- Essays on the Higher Education (1899), defending the "old" (Yale) system against the Harvard or "new" education, as praised by George Herbert Palmer
- Elements of Physiological Psychology (1889, rewritten as Outlines of Physiological Psychology, in 1890)
- Primer of Psychology (1894)
- Psychology, Descriptive and Explanatory (1894)
- Outlines of Descriptive Psychology (1898); in a "system of philosophy"
- Philosophy of the Mind (1891)
- Introduction To Philosophy: An Inquiry. A Rational System of Scientific Principles in Their Relation To Ultimate Reality (1890)
- Philosophy of Knowledge (1897)
- A Theory of Reality (1899)
- Philosophy of Conduct (1902)
- Philosophy of Religion (2 volumes, 1905)
- In Korea with Marquis Ito (1908)
- Knowledge, Life and Reality (1909)
- Rare Days in Japan (1910)
- Intimate Glimpses of Life in India (1919)

== See also ==
- American philosophy
- List of American philosophers
