= Lilian Gask =

British writer

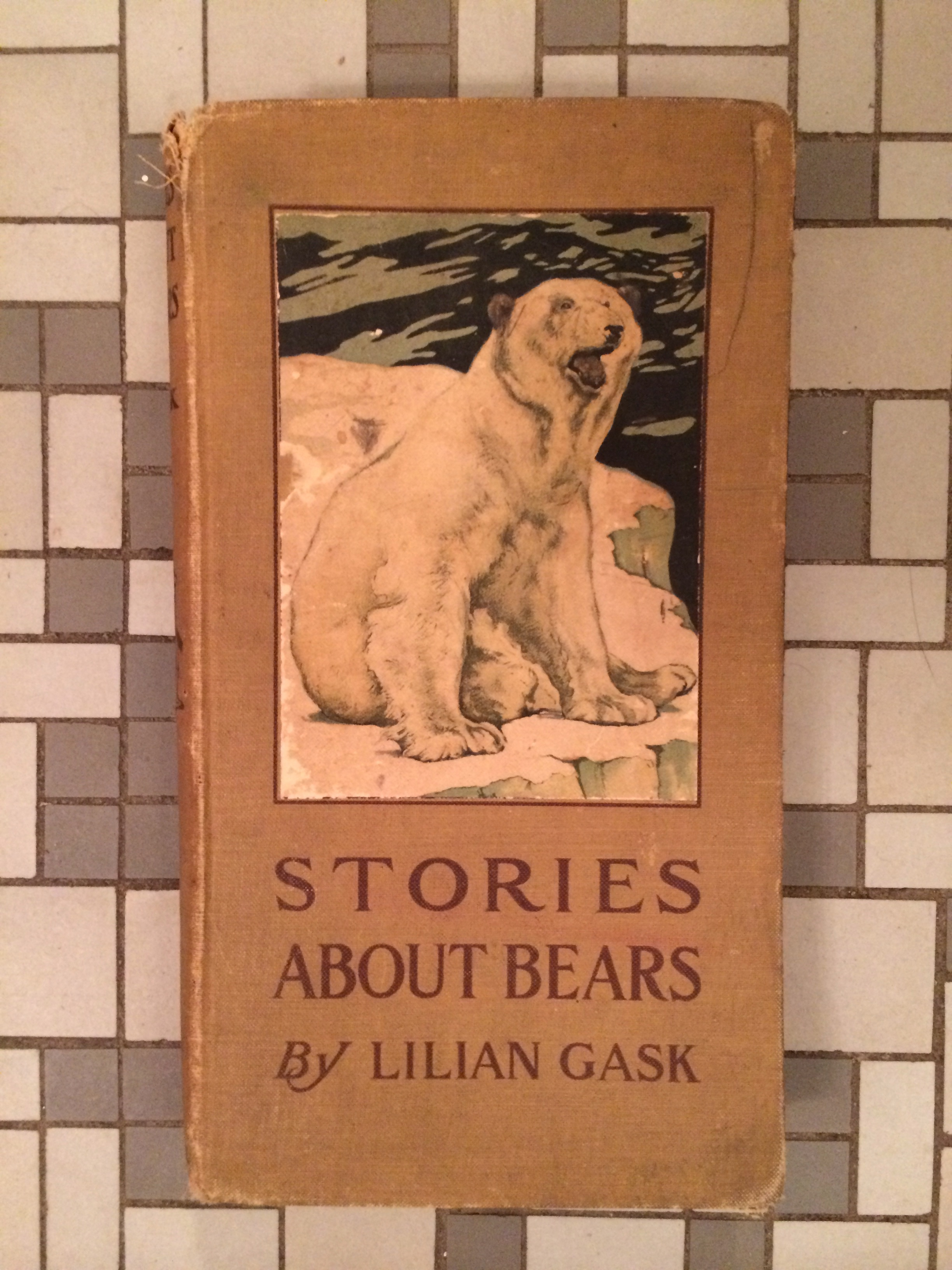
Lilian Gask's "Stories About Bears" (London: George C. Harrap, 1916) as issued in 1925 by the New York publisher Thomas Y. Crowell.

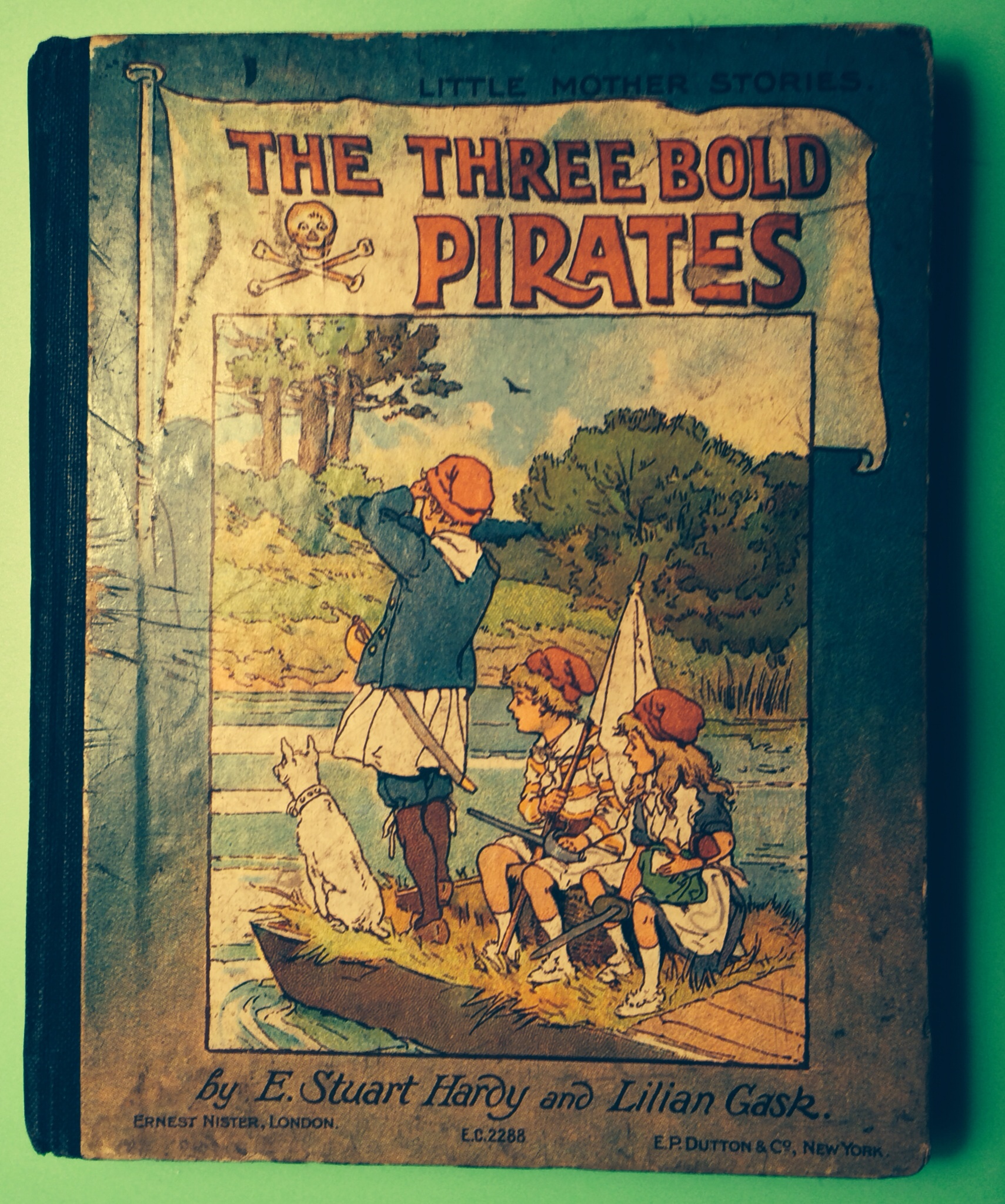
"The Three Bold Pirates" by E. Stuart Hardy (sister of the illustrator Dorothy Hardy) and Lilian Gask, one of the "Little Mother Stories" presumably published in 1909. The book is exquisitely rare today with only four known extant copies.

Lilian Fanny Gask (1865 in Marylebone – 17 November 1942 in Camberwell) was an author of children's books. She was the eldest of six children of Charles Gask, merchant, and his wife Fanny, née Edis. Her brother, Arthur Gask, was also a writer.

In 1891, she was recorded in the England and Wales Census as being employed as a "pupil nurse" in London.

In 1904, her first book, Dog Tales, was published. This was the first of about thirty books published during her lifetime. She frequently collaborated with Dorothy Hardy, a noted animal and equine illustrator.

In a review of True Stories about Horses published in The Spectator it was stated that "some of Miss Lilian Gask's 'True Stories about Horses' are almost incredible, and all are gently sentimental. But they are pleasantly written, and the illustrations, by Mr. Patten Wilson, are spirited and delicate."

== Bibliography ==
Compiled from entries in the catalogue of the British Library and Who's Who in Literature, 1927 edition

- Dog Tales (Ernest Nister, 1904). Illustrated.
- Through the Gates of the Moon: A fairy tale (John & Edward Bumpus, 1905).
- Squirrel Tales (Dutton & Co., 1906).
- Pig Tales (Dutton & Co., 1906). Illustrated by E. Heatly.
- The Wonders Of The Zoo (Gardner, 1908). With original illustrations by Dorothy Hardy.
- In Nature's School (Harrap, 1908). With 16 illustrations by Dorothy Hardy.
- The Quest Of The White Merle (1909). With sixteen illustrations by Dorothy Hardy.
- With nature's Children (Harrap, 1909). Illustrated by Dorothy Hardy.
- Holidays with our pets (Ernest Nister, 1909).
- True Stories About Dogs (Harrap, 1910). Illustrated by E. S. Hardy & Dorothy Hardy.
- Folk Tales from Many Lands (Harrap, 1910). With illustrations by Rosa C. Petherick and Kate J. Fricero.
- Bird Wonders Of The Zoo (Gardner, 1911). Illustrated by A. T. Elwes.
- Legends of Our Little Brothers: Fairy Lore of Bird and Beast (Harrap, 1912). Illustrated by Patten Wilson.
- The Fairies and the Christmas Child (Harrap, 1912). With illustrations by Willy Pogány.
- In The "Once Upon A Time": A Fairy Tale of Science (Harrap, 1913). Illustrated by Patten Wilson.
- The Hundred Best Animals (1914). With 100 illustrations from original photographs by Aug. F. W. Vogt.
- True Stories About Horses (Harrap, 1914). Illustrated by Patten Wilson.
- Stories About Bears (Harrap, 1916).
- Babes Of The Wild (1917).
- Dinky's Circus (Harrap & Co., 1918).
- Betty & Bobtail at Pine-tree Farm (Harrap & Co., 1920). Illustrated by Helen Jacobs.
- All About Pets (Harrap, 1921).
- Brave Dogs (Harrap, 1926).
- All About Animals (Harrap, 1927). Illustrated.
- Fairy Tales of Other Lands (Harrap, 1931). With illustrations by Willy Pogány.
- True Stories of Big Game and Jungles (Harrap & Co., 1933). with sixteen illustrations in colour by W. F. Cameron.
- Peter the Pup (Warne & Co., 1945). Illustrated by B. Butler.
- Happy Children and Their Pets (with stories by E. Everett Green, Lilan Gask, Frances E. Crompton and others - Ernest Nister, London & E.P. Dutton, New York, year unknown)
