= 1854 Nankai earthquake =

Earthquake and tsunami in Japan

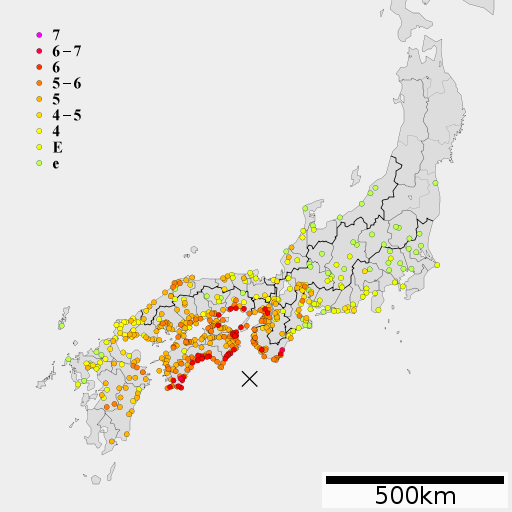

- Location within Japan
- Local date: December 24, 1854
- Local time: 16:00
- Magnitude: 8.4 M_{L}
- Epicenter: 33.0°N 135.0°E
- Fault: Nankai megathrust
- Areas affected: Japan, Tōkai region
- Tsunami: Yes
- Casualties: >3,000

The 1854 Nankai earthquake occurred at about 16:00 local time on 24 December. It had a magnitude of 8.4 and caused a damaging tsunami. More than 30,000 buildings were destroyed and there were at least 3,000 casualties.

It was the second of the three Ansei great earthquakes; the 1854 Tōkai earthquake of identical magnitude had hit northeast the previous morning, and the third 1855 Edo earthquake would strike less than a year later.

== Background ==
The southern coast of Honshu runs parallel to the Nankai Trough, which marks the subduction of the Philippine Sea plate beneath the Eurasian plate. Movement on this convergent plate boundary leads to many earthquakes, some of them of the megathrust type. The Nankai megathrust has five distinct segments (A–E) that can rupture independently, the segments have ruptured either singly or together repeatedly over the last 1300 years. Megathrust earthquakes on this structure tend to occur in pairs, with a relatively short time gap between them. In addition to the two events in 1854, there were similar earthquakes in 1944 and 1946. In each case the northeastern segment ruptured before the southwestern segment.

== Damage ==
The damage due to the earthquake was severe with 5,000 houses being destroyed and 40,000 houses badly damaged. A further 6,000 homes were damaged by fire. The tsunami washed away a further 15,000 houses and a total of 3,000 people died from either the earthquake or the tsunami. The death toll associated with the tsunami was less than would be expected in comparison to the 1707 tsunami, because many people had left the coastal area following the large earthquake the previous day. In Hiro (now Hirogawa), Goryo Hamaguchi set fires using rice straw to help guide villagers to safety. This story was turned into "A living god" by the Greek-born writer Lafcadio Hearn.

== Characteristics ==
=== Earthquake ===
Much of southwestern Honshu, Shikoku and Kyūshū experienced shaking of 5 or more on the JMA scale, with most of Shikoku and nearby coastal areas of Kansai suffering an intensity of 6.

=== Tsunami ===
On Shikoku, the greatest inundation heights were 7.5 m in Mugi, 7.5 m in Kamikawaguchi (Japanese: 上川口) of Kuroshio, 7.2 m at Asakawa on the Tokushima coast, 7.4 m at Usa, 8.4 m at Ōnogō in the Susaki area, 8.3 m at Kure on the Kōchi coast and 5 m at both Hisayoshiura and Kaizuka on the coast of Ehime.

A tsunami was observed in Shanghai, China, and a water surge of about 2 to 3 Chi was recorded in the Huangpu River.

== See also ==
- The Fire of Rice Sheaves
- List of earthquakes in Japan
- List of historical earthquakes
