= Sara Cone Bryant =

American children's writer (1873–1956)

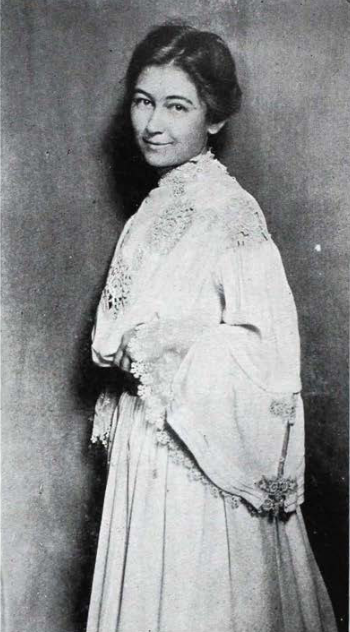
Sara Cone Bryant (1914)

Sara Cone Bryant (1873 – May 28, 1956) was an American lecturer, teacher, and writer. She wrote children's books in the early 20th century. She also supported and took a leadership role in women's suffrage.

== Early life and education ==
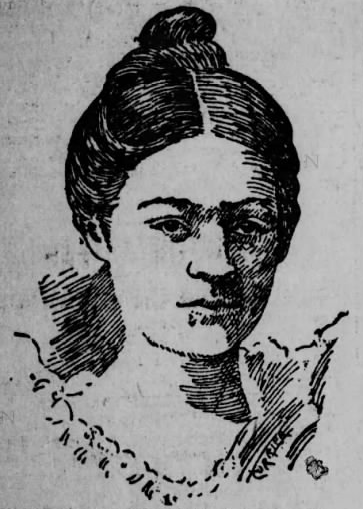
Sara Cone Bryant (1895)

Sara Cone Bryant was born in Melrose, Massachusetts, in 1873. Her parents were Dexter and Dorcas Ann (Hancock) Bryant, and her siblings included brothers Albert and Wallace.

She attended the grammar and high schools of the town, being graduated from Melrose High School in 1891 as valedictorian. The last two years of her course, she was editor of the high school paper.

Entering Boston University in the fall of 1891, Bryant at once became interested in the college paper, the University Beacon, and became a regular contributor to its pages. In her sophomore year, she was elected associate editor of the paper, and took charge of the department of college verse. At the same time, Bryant contributed largely to the newspapers, and was a frequent speaker at the women's clubs of Boston. For three years, she held leading roles in the annual French plays of the university. She was also elected by her class to the position of poet for the class day exercises. Bryant was awarded the inaugural Willard scholarship for excellence in modern languages, which gave her a year's study abroad. She graduated with B.A. in 1895, and was a member of the Kappa Kappa Gamma sorority. Her research abroad supported the study of sociology and modern languages. In 1896, she was a student of kindergarten methods in Berlin.

== Career ==
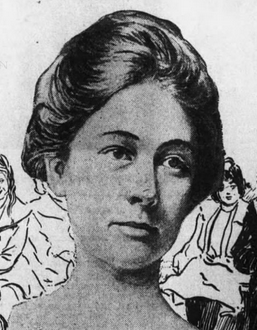
Sara Cone Bryant (1903)

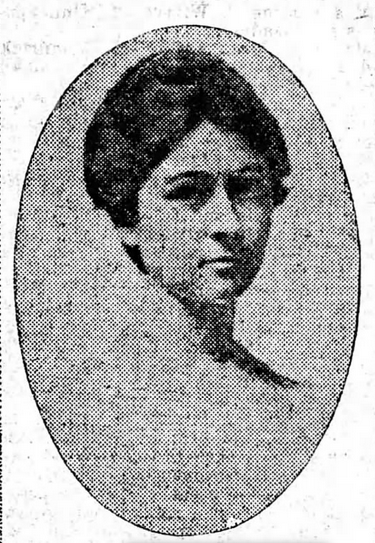
Sara Cone Bryant (1905)

During the period of 1897–1900, and again later in life, Bryant wrote for various newspapers and magazines. Her children's stories included examples of humorous tales, hero stories, fables, construction stories, and fairy tales.

She was the co-founder of the College Equal Suffrage League, and in 1901, served as its president, contending that every person in the United States should have equal rights, labors and privileges.

From 1904 until 1906, she served as instructor in English and lecturer on English poetry in Simmons College. In 1907, she was a lecturer on story-telling in the Lucy Wheelock Kindergarten in Boston, 1907.

== Personal life and death ==
On March 9, 1908, she married Theodore Franz Borst, a horticulturalist, and appears with her husband in the 1940 census. They had two children. Her brother, Albert Bryant, ran The Centaur Company and Sterling Products which later became Sterling Drug and his father-in-law was Charles Henry Fletcher.

Bryant died in Framingham, Massachusetts, on May 28, 1956.

== Selected works ==
=== Books ===
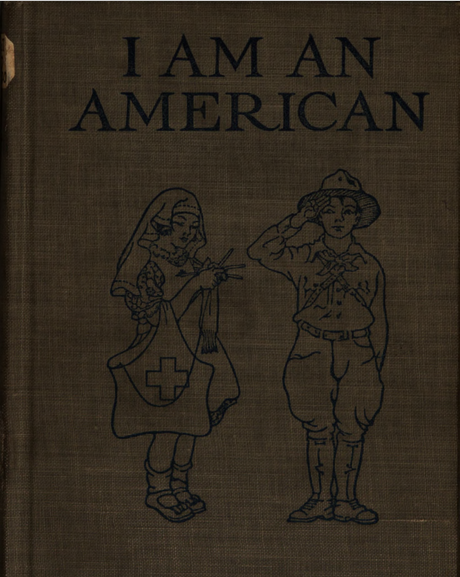
I Am an American (1918)

- How to Tell Stories To Children, 1905
- Stories to tell the littlest ones
- Epaminondas and His Auntie
- I Am an American, 1918
- The Burning Rice Fields
- Fifty-one Stories to Tell to Children
- Best Stories to Tell to Children, 1912
- Gordon and His Friends, 1924

Field Mouse"
- "The Shoemaker and the Elves
