= Zdeňka Wiedermannová-Motyčková =

Czech teacher and suffragist

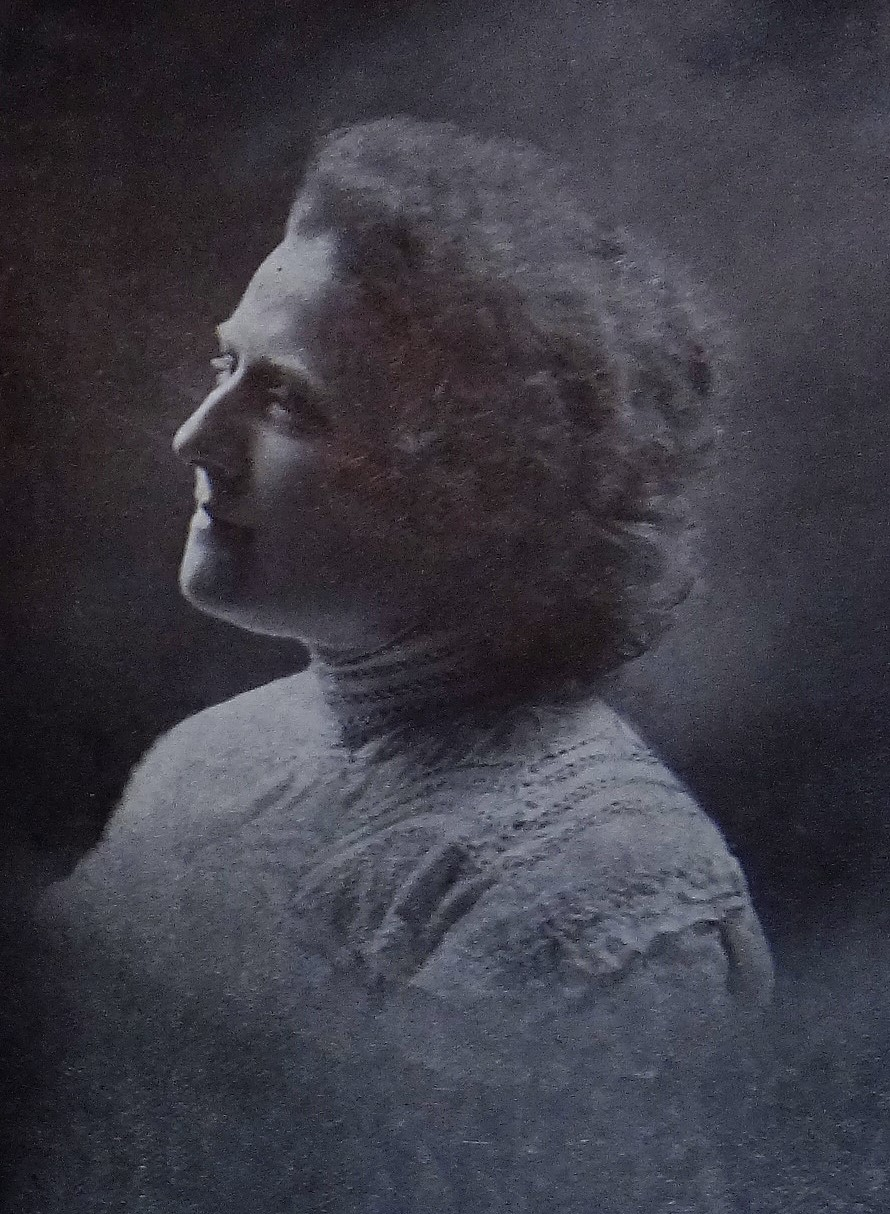
- Born: Zdeňka Maria Wiedermannová; 17 April 1868; Náklo, Austria-Hungary
- Died: 16 October 1915 (aged 47); Brno, Austria-Hungary
- Occupations: teacher, journalist, women's rights activist
- Years active: 1886–1915
- Father: Osvald Vídrman
- Relatives: Ludmila Konečná (sister)

Zdeňka Wiedermannová-Motyčková (17 April 1868 – 16 October 1915) was a Moravian teacher, journal editor, and women's rights activist. Born into a family of progressive educators, she studied to become a teacher, graduating in 1886. Her Catholic education led her to more conservative values than her family's, but after teaching for several years, she began to recognize the disparities between women and men teachers, as well as those of their students. By 1898, she was publicly calling for equal pay for equal work and campaigning for equal education for boys and girls. In 1902, Wiedermannová founded and became chair of the Moravian Teachers Union, whose focus was to professionalize teaching standards. The following year, she opened a Girls' Academy in Brno, hoping later to include secondary education there. As the Austro-Hungarian Empire provided little funding for girls' education, she held lectures to provide for the operating costs of the academy. Finally in 1908, she successfully established the first girls' secondary school in Moravia.

That year, Wiedermannová founded and became the editor for Ženská revue (Women's Review), a magazine publishing articles on developments in the international women's movement. Also in 1908, she began an informal marriage with fellow teacher Vincenc Motyčka. As he was Catholic and unable to divorce his first wife, the two were not able to formalize their union, but she added his surname to her own. In 1909, she retired as a teacher to focus on activism. She became one of the most visible Czech feminists, presenting over a hundred lectures during her career. She founded numerous women's associations and in 1910 was instrumental in the creation of a regional umbrella organization, the Progressive Organization of Women in Moravia, actively committed to women's suffrage and the integration of women into all segments of public life.

Wiedermannová-Motyčková was an active demonstrator at various rallies and participated in petition drives to secure the vote for women. She participated in international women's conferences and sought ties with feminists in other parts of the Czech lands. Through coordinated campaigns, activists tried to bring about electoral change, though their cooperation eventually broke down. From the onset of World War I, her activism shifted to focus on humanitarian aid for the poor and for soldiers' families. Her partner died in 1914 and she died the following year, shortly before Czech women secured the right to vote in 1918. She is remembered for her work to establish more extensive education for women and, more generally, to improve the status of women in Moravia.

== Early life ==
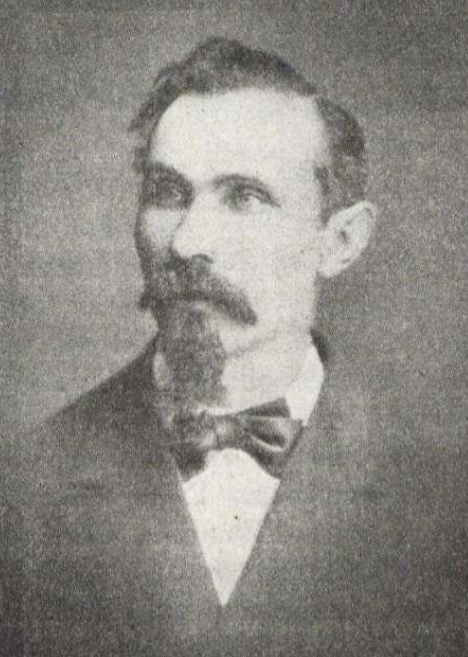
Wiedermannová's father Osvald Vídrman (Wiedermann)

Zdeňka Maria and Hedvika Wiedermannová, twin daughters of Františka (née Zbořilová) and Osvald Vídrman (Wiedermann), were born on 17 April 1868 in Náklo, in the Margraviate of Moravia, of the Lands of the Bohemian Crown in the Austro-Hungarian Empire. Her twin lived only until 26 July 1868. She had four other siblings: Ludmila (1862–1935), who would also become active in the Moravian women's movement; Božena born on 16 April 1863; Růžena born on 2 July 1866; and a younger brother, Jaroslav, born on 12 February 1873. Her father often used the Czech version of his name, Osvald Vídrman, and was a teacher and ethnographer of folk music and customs. Though she was raised in a progressive family, her Catholic training initially ingrained a more conservative philosophy for Wiedermannová. She was educated in the Catholic school system and in 1886 graduated from the teacher training institute run by the Ursuline Monastery in Olomouc.

== Career ==
=== Teaching ===
Wiedermannová began her teaching career in Frenštát pod Radhoštěm after her graduation. She was then transferred to Holešov, and later Fryštát, but left for Prague with her fiancé. When her fiancé left her, she made an attempt at suicide. Deciding to remain in Prague, she made the acquaintance in 1895 of a Catholic priest and academic, Antonín Podlaha. Her family, who were evangelical and active in the anti-clerical movement, persuaded her to return to Moravia where, by the end of the year, she was teaching in Moravské Budějovice. She then taught in Ostrava, before settling in Přerov by 1898. Wiedermannová felt trapped by the double standards of the era which allowed women to work, but paid them so little that they were often forced to marry.

By that time, Wiedermannová's religious conservatism had evaporated and at a teachers' conference held in 1898 in Přerov, she made a public protest about women's pay. When the assembly ridiculed her statement that men and women should be paid the same for the same job, Wiedermannová explained she worked as many hours as her male colleagues, taught as many students, was just as dedicated to her profession, but was paid less. To work toward wage equity, in 1902 she founded the Jednota učitelek moravských (Moravian Women Teachers Union), for which she served as chair. The teachers' union also pressed for improved academic training for teachers and industrial instructors as well as for more normal schools and other educational facilities for girls.

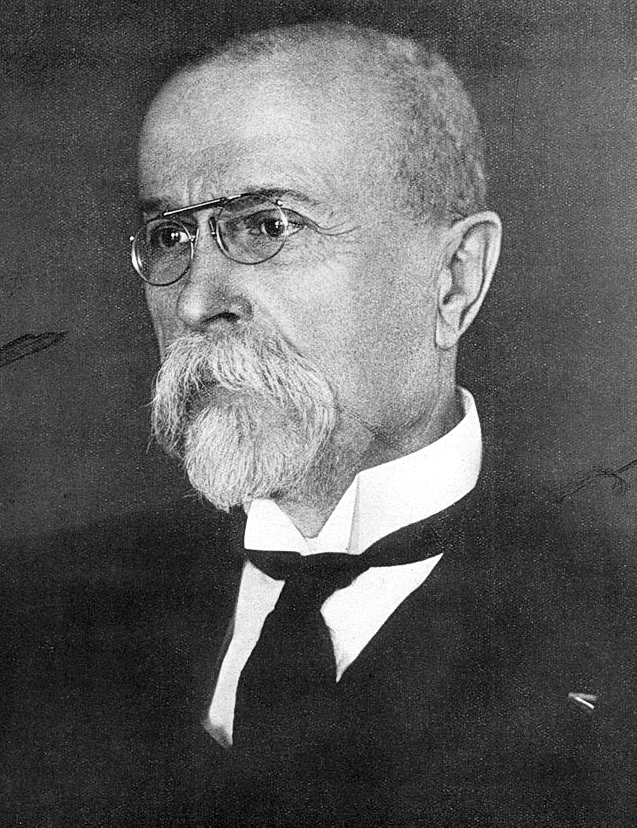
Tomáš Masaryk, Wiedermannová's mentor

Wiedermannová left Přerov and was hired as the principal of Světlá school in Velké Meziříčí, which led to her establishing relationships with some of the major figures of Czech educational reform, including František Drtina, Josef Machar, Tomáš Masaryk, and Josef Úlehla. She first met Masaryk in 1903 at a teachers' conference in Brno, where he was an invited lecturer. He became a mentor to her and tried to persuade her to serve as editor of the women's section of Naše doba (Our Time), with a view to integrating the Moravian women's movement into politics. Though she did not take up the offer, he would later be instrumental in helping her found Ženská revue (Women's Review). That year, she founded and became principal of the Girls' Academy in Brno. Because only K2.5 million, out of a total educational budget of K43 million, were dedicated to women's education by the Austro-Hungarian authorities, Wiedermannová organized fund-raising events like hosting a lecture series. The lectures were very popular, raised K7,000 over a four-year period, and provided operating capital for the academy.

Wiedermannová's goal was to open a secondary education institution for girls, but she was unable to secure adequate funds to launch a gymnasium, or to persuade the authorities to issue diplomas to graduates. When that plan failed, she asked the government to allow girls to attend the boys' gymnasium, but the authorities were against co-educational instruction. They only allowed girls to attend classes as observers at three institutions and only for lectures on history, mathematics, and physics. She continued to press for adoption of a reform curriculum providing basic mandatory education, including certificates for all graduates who had met basic educational requirements.

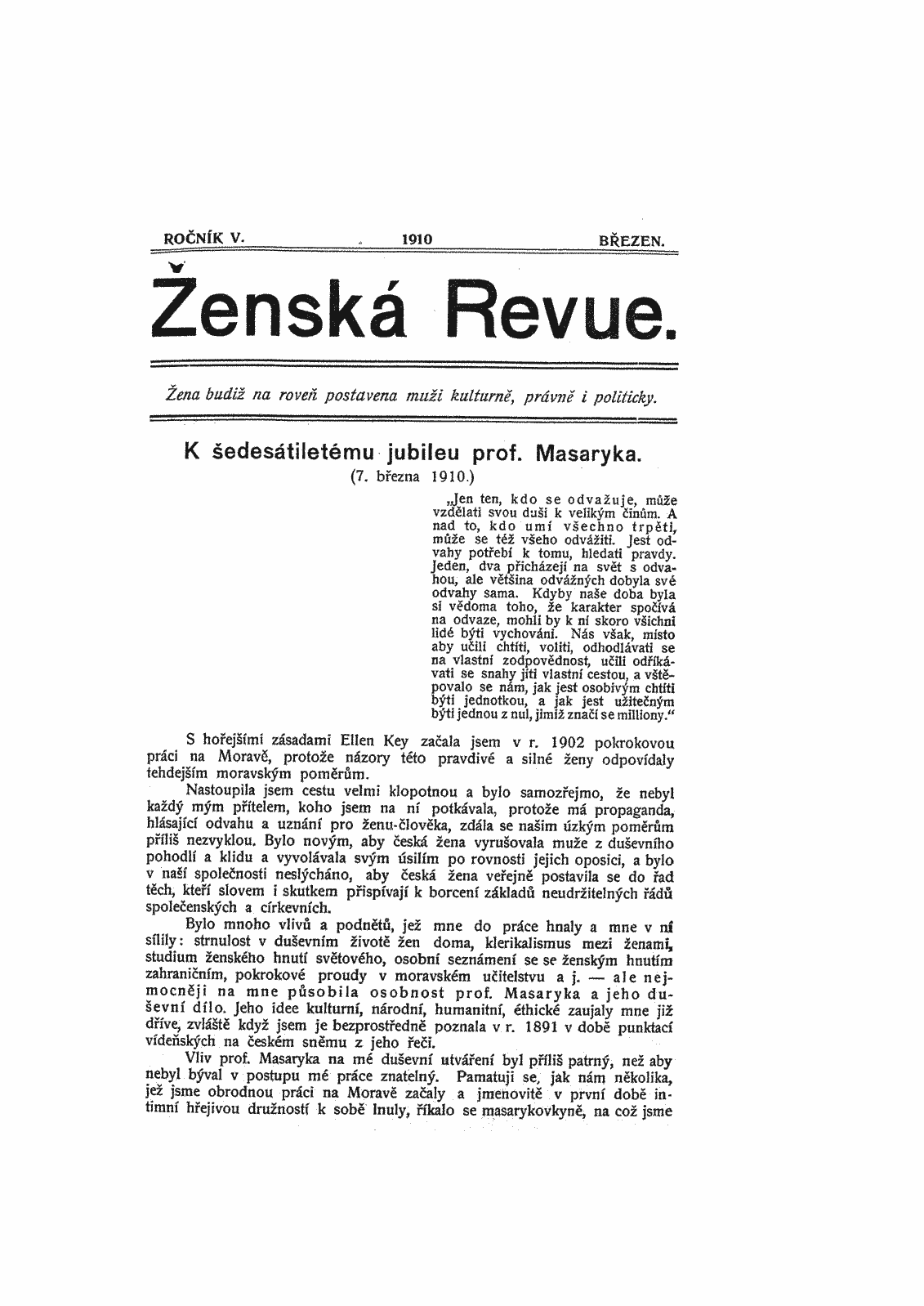
Ženská revue May 1910

As early as 1904, progressive women like Wiedermannová began agitating for the right to vote, petitioning the legislature for changes to the civil code, and protesting legislation prohibiting married women from teaching. Also that year, she attended the Second Congress of the International Woman Suffrage Alliance held in Berlin, where she presented a lecture on girls' secondary education in the Czech lands. In 1907, Wiedermannová gave a lecture in Prague, Emancipace ženy od kněze (Emancipation of a Woman from a Priest), in which she criticized the Catholic Church for "emotionally and mentally abusing women" and argued that monastic education did not provide adequate instruction or prepare girls for the teaching profession. Although a women's gymnasium was allowed to open in Velké Meziříčí, Wiedermannová had still not achieved her goal for Brno. Her overwork led to an illness, which left her with a weak heart and impacted her hearing.

By 1908, articles demanding equal rights regularly appeared in women's journals in Moravia and three women were proposed as candidates to the state legislative assembly. Wiedermannová founded and became the editor for Ženská revue, a magazine which provided information about the international women's movement, as well as on teachers and education. Approval was finally given for the Girl's Reform High School, but it was not allowed to use the term "gymnasium" until 1910. Also that year, she began living with another teacher, Vincenc Motyčka. As a Catholic, he was unable to remarry, as he had divorced his wife, so he and Wiedermannová were unable to formalize their relationship. The conservative community was scandalized by their living arrangement and pushed for her to resign from her post at the Girls' Academy. Undaunted, Wiedermannová left the church, modified her surname to include that of her partner, and helped him raise his two children. After a year of juggling teaching and editing, she decided to retire and applied for her pension, so she could focus on editing the magazine.

=== Women's rights activism ===
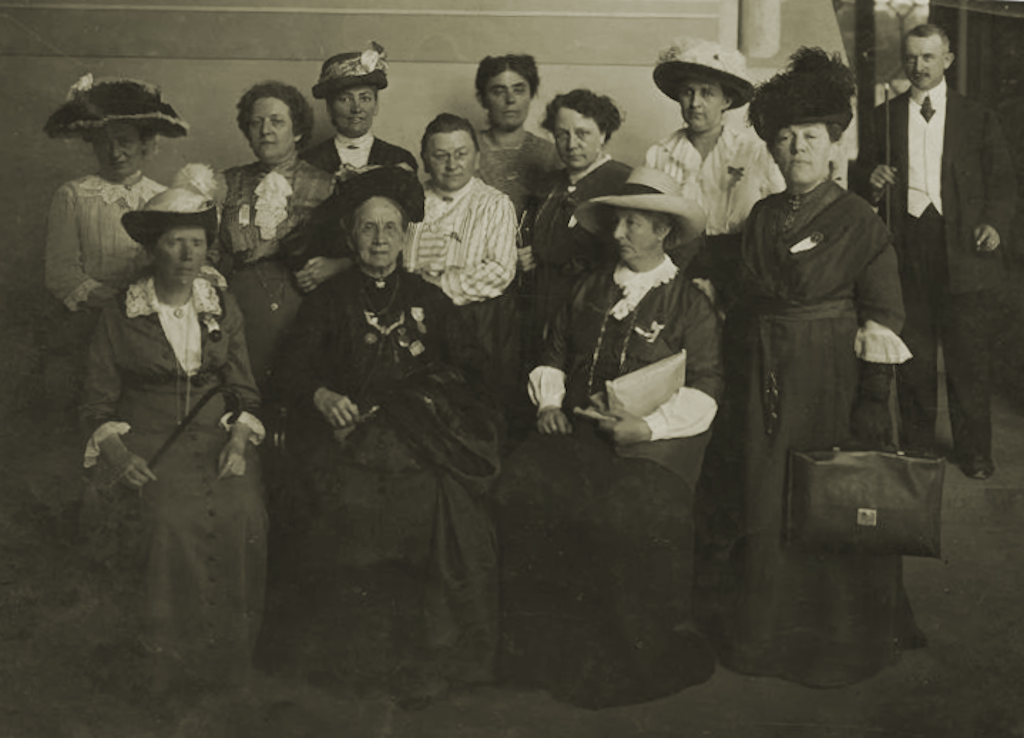
Feminists at the Seventh Conference of the International Woman Suffrage Alliance hosted in Budapest, 1913 (Wiedermannová-Motyčková is standing second from the left)

In 1909, Wiedermannová-Motyčková founded the Sdružení pokrokových žen (Association of Progressive Women) in Olomouc. Her ultimate goal was to establish independent regional associations clustered under an umbrella organization, which would coordinate the common goals and ideology of the Moravian women's movement. The association established committees dedicated to women's education, legal parity, socio-political and economic equality, as well as morality and hygiene sections. The members monitored laws and held lectures to educate women on the issues and their obligations as citizens. Wiedermannová-Motyčková became a noted lecturer on women's issues, giving over a hundred presentations in Brno throughout the course of her career. Organizing courses to train mothers, establishing shelters for abandoned or illegitimate children, and pressing for legal reforms — like obligatory civil marriage, the possibility of divorce or separation, and regulations to control working conditions — all became areas members worked on to improve the socio-economic status of women.

In 1910, Wiedermannová-Motyčková attended the founding meeting of the Zemská organizace pokrokových žen moravských (Provincial Organization of Progressive Moravian Women) in Brno. Helping to write the Articles of Association, she tried to temper the political activism of the organization, since federal law prohibited women from creating political associations. Nonetheless, the application for the organization was rejected by the authorities on 20 April 1910. Nine days later, the women organized the Pokroková organizace žen na Moravě (Progressive Organization of Women in Moravia), proposing a broader focus of women's empowerment, through improved education, economic independence, and legal change to grant women full citizenship. Marie Vášová was elected as chair and Wiedermannová-Motyčková served as the executive. By the end of that year, other regional women's organizations had been formed and the journal Právo ženy (Rights of Women) had been established as the official press organ of the Progressive Organization of Women in Moravia. The magazine was founded by Wiedermannová-Motyčková and her partner Motyčka, to encourage popular support for women's suffrage and equality. It published speeches from rallies and demonstrations throughout the region in a consolidated format, raising awareness of the issues confronting women.

Establishing ties with the Moravian People's Progressive Party, which agreed to place women's issues on its platform, Wiedermannová-Motyčková and the Moravian Progressive Organization became part of the larger cooperation of women in the Czech lands. This was difficult, as the Moravian women's movement had stronger ties to Austrian feminists, had been established later than other Czech groups, and was seriously hampered by the influence of the Catholic Church. Along with Františka Plamínková and Karla Máchová, both teachers from Bohemia, she became one of the most vocal representatives of the Czech woman's movement. Plamínková was invited to chair the Committee on Electoral Rights of Moravian Women and Wiedermannová-Motyčková drafted the political program, calling for full civil equality with men, abolishment of the law forbidding women's political associations, opening professions to women, and women's suffrage. By 1911, women had won the right to organize politically and began petitioning the Bohemian Diet for enfranchisement.

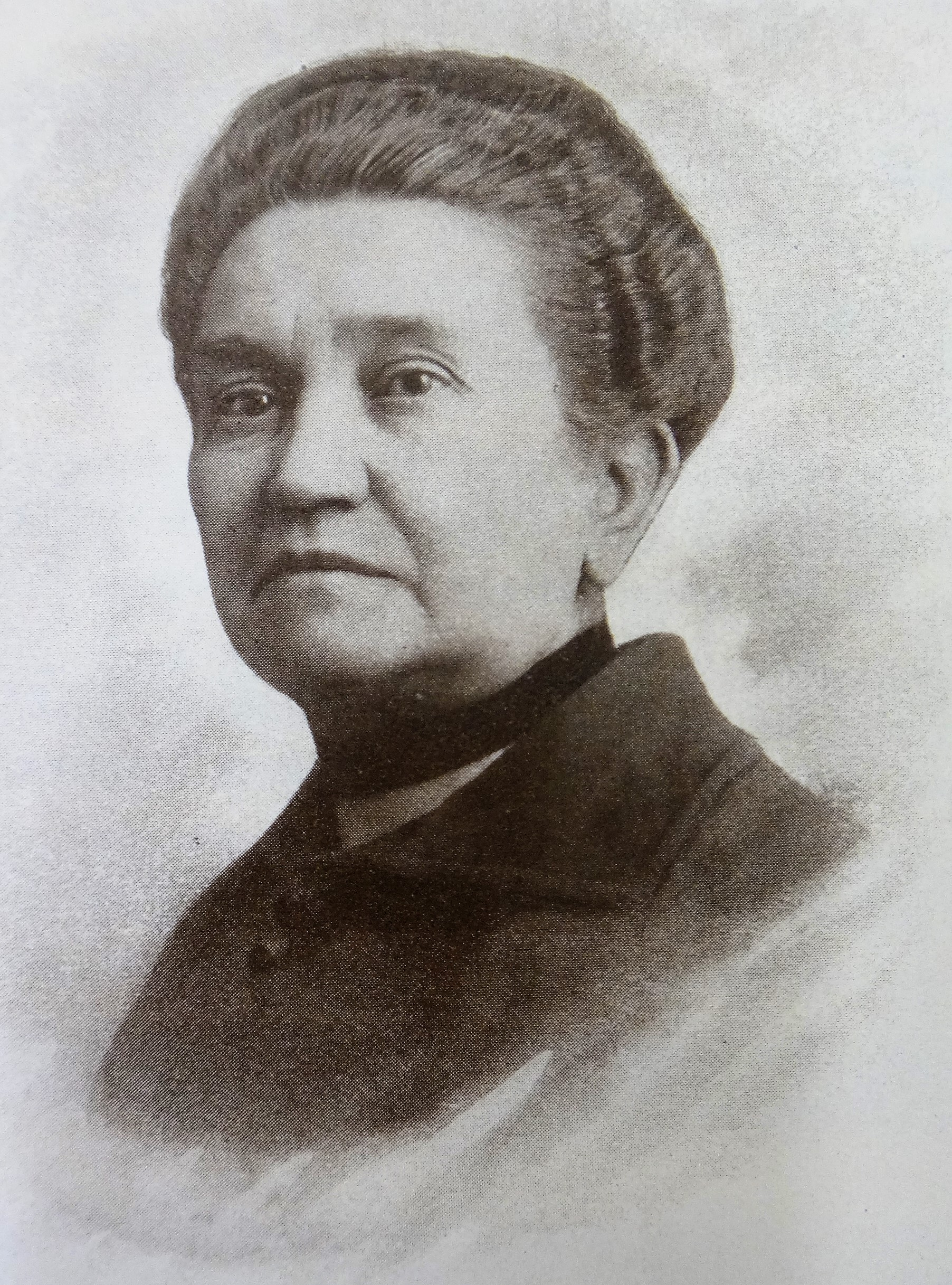
Wiedermannová's sister, Ludmila Konečná in 1932

Throughout 1911, rallies and demonstrations were held and in June a women's conference was held in Olomouc. The conference included elections for organizing an executive committee for the Zemská pokroková organizace žen na Moravě (Regional Progressive Women's Organization in Moravia). Wiedermannová-Motyčková's sister, Ludmila Konečná, was elected as chair and she was selected as the organization's secretary. The Olomouc conference was the first significant gathering of women in the Czech lands and was used as a rallying meeting to urge that petitions be drafted by all Czech women's groups and simultaneously delivered to the Diet in Vienna. Wiedermannová-Motyčková and Plamínková presented speeches on democracy and civil equality while Wiedermannová-Motyčková and Vášová were chosen as delegates to bring the Moravian petitions to Austria. Suffering from illness, Wiedermannová-Motyčková was unable to travel in July, so her sister Ludmila led the Moravian delegation. Though legislators promised to give the petitions consideration, they adjourned without reforming the election laws.

The year 1912 was marked by more rallies and demonstrations. With the election of Božena Viková-Kunětická to the Diet and her subsequent rejection by the governor, Czech nationalists, who saw the invalidation of the election as an overreach of Austria's central authority, began supporting women's suffrage. Bolstered by the surge in public support, activists began planning a renewed push for electoral reform in 1913. They began hosting lectures to familiarize women with the various political parties. These courses had an average of 150 people in attendance and concluded with Wiedermannová-Motyčková giving an overview of the activities of the Regional Progressive Women's Organization in Moravia.

When the elections in 1913 for the Moravian Provincial Assembly were held, 400 women teachers, who were not on the electoral lists, filed protests with the Municipal Council of Brno. The women argued that in accordance with the judgment of the Administrative Court of 21 October 1908, teachers were allowed to vote and excluding female teachers contravened the law. The Council's answer was that the allowance for teachers to vote applied only for municipal elections. Though teachers continued to protest, the Council's interpretation was upheld in a decision by the Supreme Imperial Court that fall. In June, Wiedermannová-Motyčková and other Moravian feminists attended a conference in Prague organized by Plamínková and Bohemian activists. She was also sent as a delegate to the Seventh Conference of the International Woman Suffrage Alliance hosted in Budapest where she made a presentation on the struggle for suffrage in Moravia.

By the end of the year, fractures in the relationship with Bohemian feminists occurred when Wiedermannová-Motyčková's proposal for centralizing efforts on electoral rights was rejected by Plamínková because the electoral rules varied between Bohemia, Moravia and Silesia. A full cessation of cooperation occurred by the end of the year, as neither of them wanted to cede power and both feared that either Moravian or Czech perspectives would dominate their strategies. A series of attacks in Ženský obzor (Women's Horizon) followed, where both Wiedermannová-Motyčková and Plamínková accused each other of being unable to set aside their personal ambitions for the good of the movement. In 1914, the Regional Progressive Organization of Women in Moravia submitted a petition to the Moravian Provincial Assembly for universal suffrage, but the outbreak of World War I interrupted the reform and curtailed women's political activities until the end of the war.

During the war, Wiedermannová-Motyčková turned her focus to charitable activities. Along with other members of the Regional Progressive Organization of Women in Moravia, she organized collections to raise money for the poor and the families of soldiers. Aware that women with children needed to work while their husbands were away fighting, she also called for the establishment of shelters to care for their children. Wiedermannová-Motyčková published articles in Ženská revue outlining where help was needed and continued to produce articles to inform women about health issues, economic challenges, and cultural events. In 1914, Vincenc Motyčka died, which left Wiedermannová-Motyčková in a precarious financial situation and worried for his children. Trying to keep Ženské revue open exhausted her and hastened her early death.

== Death and legacy ==
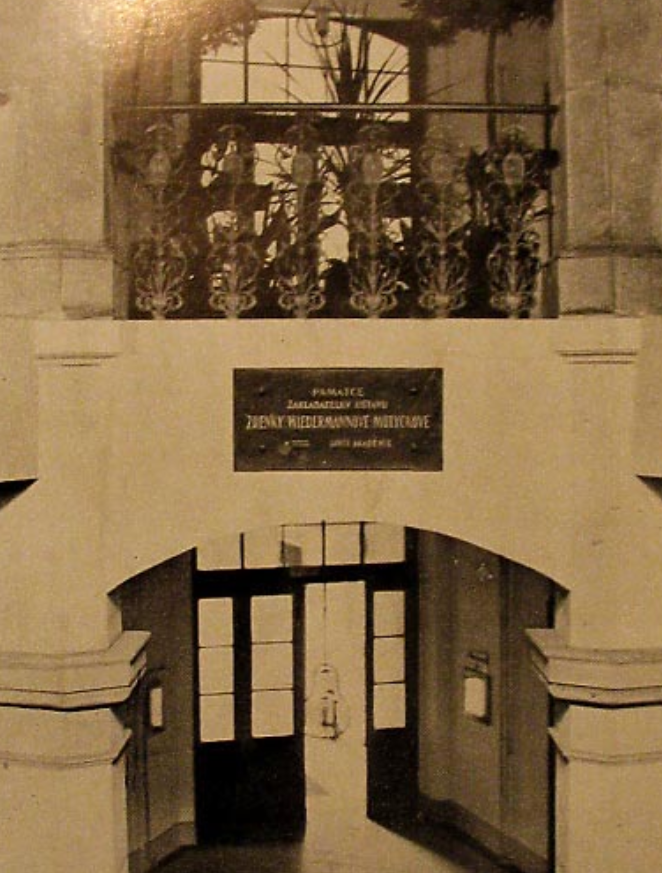
Memorial plaque honoring Wiedermannová-Motyčková at the Girls' Real Gymnasium on Mendel Square in Brno, 1925

Wiedermannová-Motyčková died on 16 October 1915 in Brno after a heart attack, and was buried in the city's Central Cemetery. Her tombstone was designed by Julius Pelikán. Following their deaths, her sister Ludmila Konečná and her brother-in-law Alois Konečný were buried with her. She is remembered for her work to establish the first girls' gymnasium in Moravia, and for having significantly influenced the political activism of Moravian women in her era, using progressive ideas to overcome religious conservatism. Though she did not live to see it, Czech women gained the right to vote in 1918.

Ženská revue was continued until 1920 with funding and editing provided by her sisters Ludmila and Božena, Anna Tollnerová, and Ludmila Zatloukalová-Coufalová. In 1925, a plaque honoring Wiedermannová-Motyčková's initiative to press for secondary education for women was unveiled at the Girls' Real Gymnasium on Mendel Square in Brno. Between 1933 and 1934, her sister, Ludmila Konečná wrote a memoir, Zdenka Wiedermannová: Zakladatelka ženského hnutí na Moravě, 1868–1915 (Zdenka Wiedermannová: Founder of the Women's Movement in Moravia, 1868–1915), which is contained in the archives of Alois Konečný and Ludmila Konečná at the Museum of National History and Geography in Šumperk.
