= Božena Zelinková =

Czech teacher and women's rights activist

- Born: 21 May 1869; Semtěš, Austria-Hungary
- Died: 16 June 1936 (aged 67); Kolín, Czechoslovakia
- Occupation(s): teacher, women's rights activist

Božena Zelinková (21 May 1869 – 18 June 1936) was a Czech teacher and women's rights activist.

== Biography ==
Zelinková was born in Semtěš in 1869 in the family of a teacher.

In 1908, using a legal loophole, together with Karla Máchová and Marie Tůmová, she was among the first three women to unsuccessfully run for the Bohemian Diet. Zelinková ran for the Německý Brod–Humpolec–Polná district. However, she withdrew from the race just before the date of the elections.
