= Marie Tůmová =

Czech women's suffragist and teacher (1866–1925)

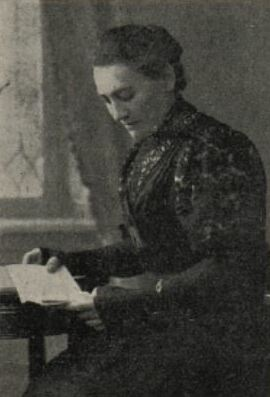
- Born: 12 June 1866; Prague, Austrian Empire
- Died: 1 May 1925 (aged 58); Prague, Czechoslovakia
- Occupation(s): teacher, women's suffragist, politician

Marie Tůmová (12 June 1866 – 1 May 1925) was a Czech women's suffragist and a teacher. In 1908, using a legal loophole, Tůmová was among the first three women to unsuccessfully run to be elected to the Bohemian Diet.

== Career ==
=== Teaching ===
Marie Tůmová worked as a teacher and, during World War I, became the principal of a municipal girls' school in Žižkov – a first woman to helm a municipal school in Bohemia. In 1919–1925, she worked on behalf of the Czechoslovak Ministry of Education in Carpathian Ruthenia and Slovakia, but malnutrition and bad living conditions led to a fatal illness.

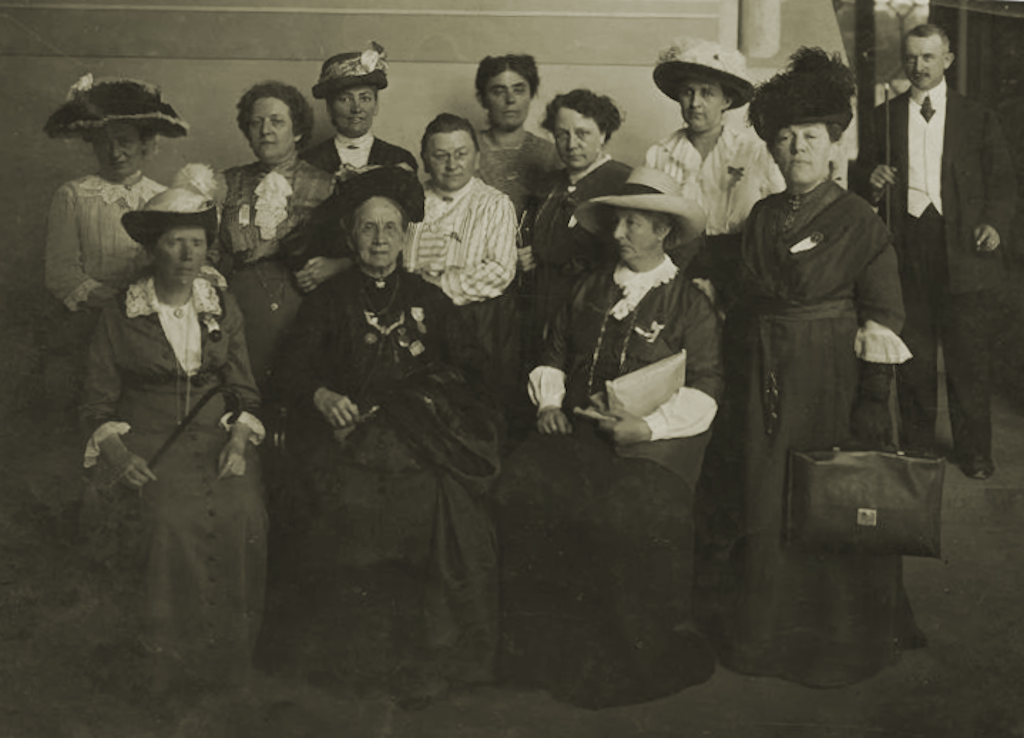
Tůmová (standing, third from left) at the Seventh Conference of the International Woman Suffrage Alliance in Budapest, 1913

=== Activism ===
Tůmová advocated for women's rights and was a member of Czech women's and teachers' associations, such as Women's National Council She was friends with a fellow teacher and suffragist Františka Plamínková, with whom she worked in the Committee for Women's Suffrage. Tůmová represented the committee abroad, traveling to Stockholm, Rome, Bucharest, Budapest and London.

In 1908, using a legal loophole, the Committee for Women's Suffrage nominated Tůmová in the elections for the Bohemian assembly. Thus, together with Karla Máchová and Božena Zelinková, Tůmová was among the first three women to run for the Bohemian Diet. She ran in the Vysoké Mýto-Skuteč-Hlinsko voting district and received around 200 votes. None of the women candidates secured a seat in the assembly, but the general public was shocked by how many votes had been cast in their favour. The committee ran Tůmová for the next elections as well, but with similar results. Eventually, it was Božena Viková-Kunětická who became the first woman elected to the Bohemian Diet.

== Personal life ==
Marie Tůmová was born in Prague in 1866. Her parents were the journalist, writer and politician Karel Tůma and Marie Čelakovská, whose father was the poet František Čelakovský.
