= Josef Reinsberg =

Czech medical doctor (1844–1930)

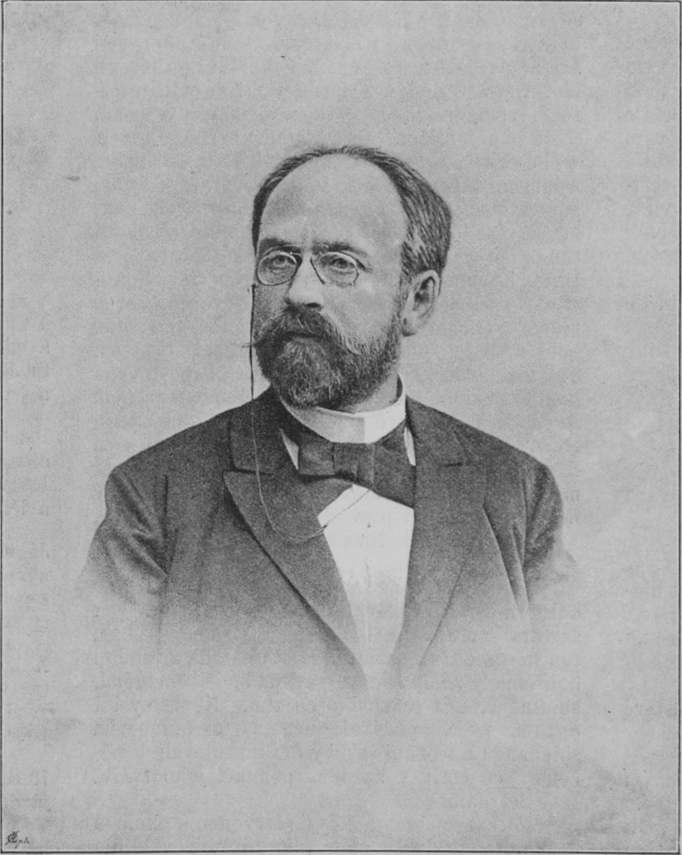
- Reinsberg in 1892
- Born: 18 August 1844; Přibyslav, Bohemia, Austrian Empire
- Died: 29 January 1930 (aged 85); Prague, Czechoslovakia
- Burial place: Olšany Cemetery
- Occupations: medical doctor and teacher
- Awards: Honorary citizenship of the town of Žamberk

Josef Reinsberg (18 August 1844 – 29 January 1930) was a Czech medical doctor. He was professor of forensic medicine at the Faculty of Medicine of Charles University, and is considered founder of Czech forensic medicine. Later he was dean of the Faculty and rector of the university (1898–1899). He was member of the Bohemian Diet and contributor to the Otto's encyclopedia.

== Life ==
He was born on 18 August 1844 in Přibyslav, Bohemia, Austrian Empire as the son of Marie and Jan Reinsberg. In 1864, he graduated from the secondary school in Klatovy and on 19 March 1870 he was graduated from the Prague Medical Faculty.

He worked first as an external medical doctor in the surgical department of the General University Hospital in Prague, then as an assistant in the obstetric clinic of prof. Jan Streng. In 1871, he was appointed town and factory medical doctor in Žamberk. Two years later he became a court medical doctor and a general practitioner at the Catharine Hospital in Žamberk. At the same time he worked as a court-appointed medical doctor at the district courts in Hradec Králové, Rokytnice and Žamberk as well as at the regional court in Hradec Králové. In 1874, he established a private chemical laboratory.

On 12 January 1879, after passing the examinations, he was appointed district medical doctor for the Klatovy Health District.

=== Pedagogical activity ===
He made annual study trips to Austrian university towns. In 1883, he stayed in Munich for an internship. A year later he was admitted to the Czech Charles-Ferdinand University, where he founded the Institute for Forensic Medicine. In July 1885, he was appointed an associate professor and in July 1886 a full professor. In addition to forensic medicine, he also lectured on public health, health policy and hygiene. His lectures on emergency life support were intended for a wider audience. When professor Václav Bělohradský died in 1896, Reinsberg taught forensic medicine at the faculty of law for several years.

In 1891, 1896, and 1903 he held the position of Dean of the Prague Medical Faculty. In 1899 he was appointed rector of the Czech Charles-Ferdinand University. During his rectorship he was also a member of the Bohemian Diet. He gave up teaching in 1908 for health reasons.

=== Public life ===
He has been publicly active all his life. As a medical doctor, he was one of the founders of the Association of Czech Medics, where he co-published a journal with Vítězslav Janovský and was also elected chairman. Together with Štěpán Pučálka, the executive of the association, he had a portrait of J. E. Purkyně painted by Petr Maixner and donated it to the Institute of Physiology. He also participated in the collection of Czech medical terminology.

In Žamberk he introduced evening lectures in the trade and apprenticeship school. He also served in the municipal council, the town council, as deputy mayor and district mayor. On his retirement, he was made an honorary citizen. He co-founded the Literary Unity in Klatovy.

In Prague, he served as a court-appointed medical doctor at the provincial court from 1885 to 1908. Starting from 1896, he also worked at the arbitration court of the accident insurance company. Additionally, he was a member of the provincial health council and the city health commission from 1885 to 1912. He became active in the Association of Czech Medical Doctors in 1886, eventually holding the position of mayor. After the departure of Dr. Chodounský, he edited the Časopis českých lékařů (Journal of Czech Medical Doctors).

From 1885 he gave popular lectures for the benefit of the student support societies and on festive occasions. As rector of the university, on 5 April 1899, he launched a series of popular lectures for the general public, organised mainly thanks to Otakar Hostinský and his colleagues from the Faculty of Philosophy.

He was a co-founder (with prof. Jarník) and the first chairman of the large student canteen (Mensa Academica), and after the passing of prof. Antonín Frič, he took over the management of the supportive Hus Foundation.

He was also briefly chairman of the ethnographic society and participated in the management of the 1895 ethnographic exhibition.

=== Family life and late life ===
Josef Reinsberg married Anna, née Havlíček (1850–?), daughter of the local postmaster, on 3 October 1871 in Lovčice. The Reinsbergs had nine children, some of whom died prematurely.

He died on 29 January 1930 and was buried at Olšany Cemetery.

== Work ==
He was the author of a number of studies published in professional journals, such as:

- Reinsberg, Josef (1879). O uškození na těle (Časopis českých lékařů XVIII) (in Czech).
- Reinsberg, Josef (1885–87). Kausistické příspěvky k nauce o náhlé a násilné smrti (in Czech).
- Reinsberg, Josef (1901). Příspěvek k nauce o otravě nikotinem (Věstník III. sjezdu českých přírodozpytců a lékařů v Praze (in Czech).

Separately published, for example:

- Reinsberg, Josef (1885). Soudní lékařská kasuistika (in Czech).
- Reinsberg, Josef (1896). Nauka o soudním lékar̆ství (in Czech). Prague: Bursík a Kohout. OCLC 14791835.
- Reinsberg, Josef (1896). Sbírka soudních lékařských posudků (superarbitrií) České lékařské fakulty (in Czech). Prague: Bursík a Kohout. OCLC 85654015.
- Reinsberg, Josef (1899). O zhoubném účinku elektřiny na tělo lidské a zvířecí (in Czech).

He contributed to the Otto's encyclopedia under the mark Rg.
