= Jan Filip (priest) =

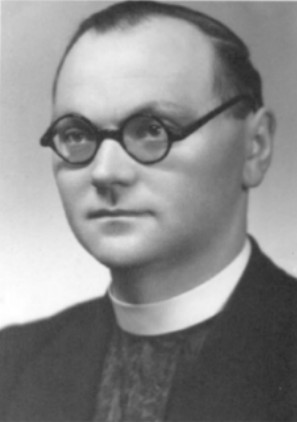
Jan Filip

Jan Filip (born 9 December 1911 in Přibyslav; died 21 November 1971 in Kratonohy, near Hradec Králové) was a Czech priest, doctor of theology, professor, writer, Esperantist, and lexicographer.

== Life ==
He was born into the family of Francisko Filip, a weaver in Přibyslav who already had four other children: Jan's brothers Venceslao and Francisko and sisters Karla and Maria. After four years, another brother, Karlo, was born. Jan Filip spent his childhood in Přibyslav, where he attended primary school. He was accepted to a high school in Prague, which he finished with an abitur, on which he received an excellent score, in 1931. In Hradec Králové, he studied at a theological seminary for pastors, and in 1936 he became a priest. He celebrated the solemn first fruit mass in his hometown Přibyslav.

He began as a chaplain in Jičín. After a year, he was an administrator in the parish of Nová Ves nad Popelkou. For a year, he was a chaplain in Kutná Hora and finally, he taught religion, history, and Latin at a high school and a school for teachers for six years, also in Kutná Hora. He taught for one year at a high school in Dvůr Králové, for another year at a high school in Jičín, and for three more years at a high school in Náchod.

In the year 1950, after the beginning of a strong political leaning towards communism, he was prohibited from teaching and only allowed to provide pastoral care. He provided pastoral care for five years in his hometown Přibyslav, for four months in Veliš, for four years in Chleny, for four years in Letohrad, and for nine years in Kratonohy, near Hradec Králové, where he died.

His grave in Přibyslav has a statue of the Virgin Mary – a personal donation from Belgian Esperantists.

== Esperanto ==
Filip, a talented nine-year-old, learned Esperanto in 1921. In 1925, at age 13, he began to write an extensive Esperanto-Czech dictionary, because at the time nothing of the kind had ever been published. After three years he finished the compilation of the dictionary, with the help of his brother Karel Filip, and despite the fact that two more years passed before it was published in 1930, he became the youngest lexicographer in the world. A second edition appeared in 1947, and a reprinting in 1987. His Esperanto-Czech and Czech-Esperanto dictionaries, also written with his brother Karel, appeared in Prague in 1958 with 550 and 450 pages.

His translation of a collection of Czech folksongs into Esperanto was published twice. During his years of high school in Prague, the international association of Esperantists announced a competition for the most beautiful poem about the Virgin Mary in Esperanto. The first prize in the contest was deliberately only symbolic, but beautiful: a bouquet of white roses, which the winner was to place at the feet of the statue of the Virgin Mary in Lourdes. Jan Filip, then only a young student from Prague, won the first prize. Despite the fact that he himself did not visit Lourdes, because his school did not allow him to, representatives from the Klubo de Katolikaj Esperantistoj placed his bouquet of white roses at the feet of the Virgin Mary in Lourdes. The name of the Czech Esperantist Jan Filip was soon known throughout the Esperanto community.

In the year 1968, the Swiss Esperantist and translator Madlen Welsh visited him in Kratonohy, so that she could personally meet this eminent Esperantist who had written extensive dictionaries and many books in Esperanto. At that time, his plays were being performed in Switzerland: La Turo Inter Nuboj ("The Tower Between Clouds") and Fino de la Mondo ("End of the World"). In 1970, he translated many religious songs for young Catholic Esperantists, which were sung in tent camps in Herbortice.

Later, he visited many foreign countries, where his lectures in Esperanto about the Czech Republic captured the attention of his audiences. He even received special thanks from Czech state officials for lectures in Belgium, the Netherlands, and Great Britain.

In addition to Esperanto, he was fluent in several foreign languages, into which he translated his poems, stories, and plays. Additionally, he learned the basics of many other languages for his studies.

His poems appeared for decades in various Esperanto gazettes. He wrote several brochures, led correspondence courses, and wrote 14 plays in Czech.

== Copyrights of the Filip brothers ==
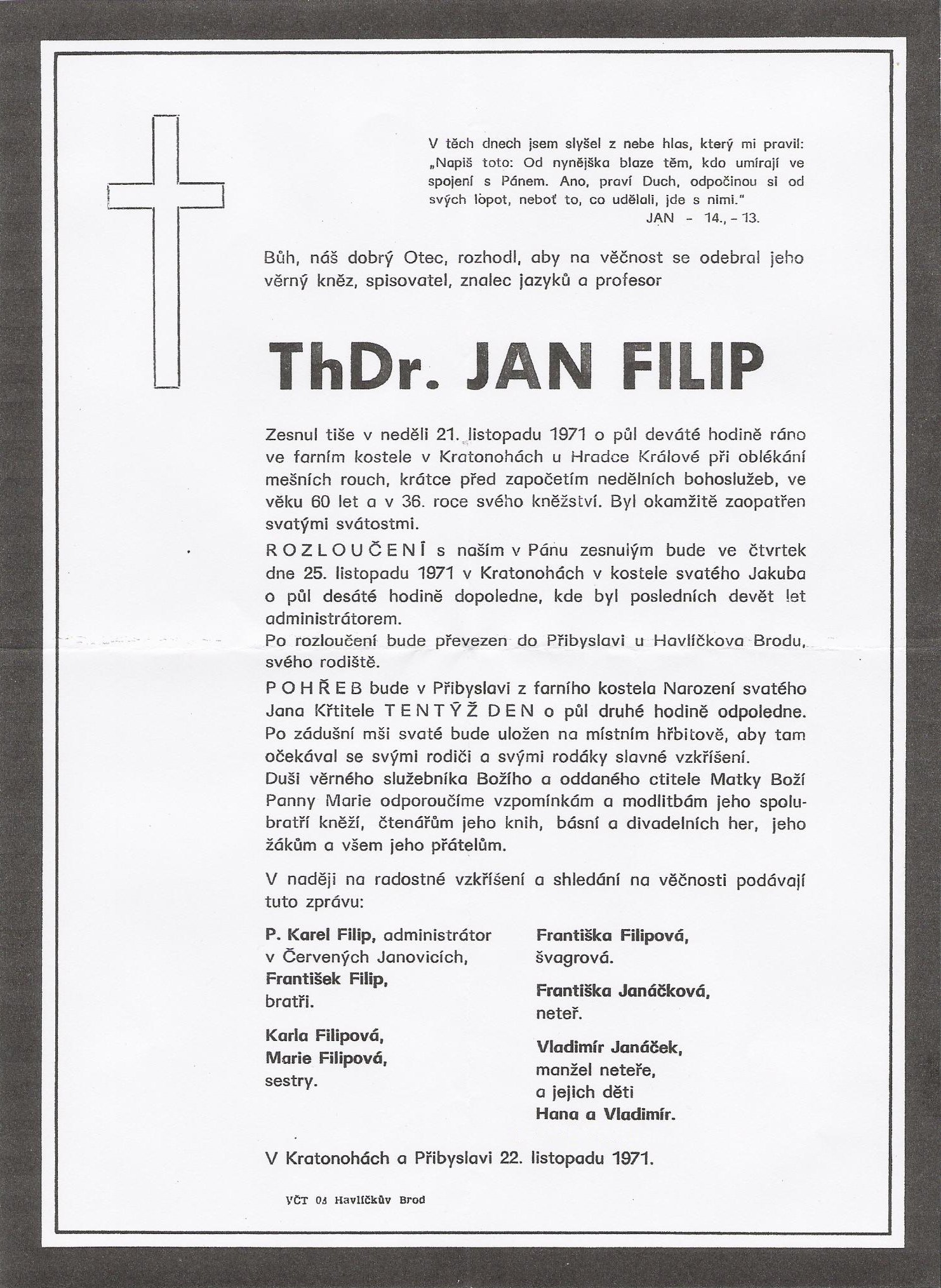
Obituary of Jan Filip

The complete works of the brothers Jan and Karel Filip were made available under a Creative Commons Attribution-ShareAlike 3.0 Czech Republic license, as demonstrated by OTRS record no. 2009072310074867. The signed declaration can be found in the archives of the Czech Esperanto Association.

== Original works ==
- Fino de la Mondo ("End of the World") (drama, set to music)
- La Turo inter Nuboj ("The Tower between Clouds") (play)
- Kantareto ("Little song collection") (two editions, folksongs and religious songs) – see Kantareto – ĉeĥoslovakaj popolaj kantoj 001
- Velký slovník esperantsko-český
- Velký slovník česko-esperantský
- Mezinárodní řeč a katolíci

== Works in Czech ==
- Bělička pro pana profesora (1934, as V. M. Vlček)
- Bílá sova (1939, as V. M. Vlček)
- Biely čin (1948, with his brother Karel)
- Cestou domů (1945, with his brother Karel)
- Chrám (1934, as V. M. Vlček)
- Konec světa (1933 and 1935, as V. M. Vlček)
- Křížek na čele (1939, as V. M. Vlček)
- Květy mládí (1934 and 1936, as V. M. Vlček)
- Pomněnka (1930, as V. M. Vlček)
- U Jezulátka (1941, 1943, 1991)
- Pri Jezuliatku (1948)
- Řím. Obraz z doby pronásledování křesťanů (1932, as Václav Vlček)
- Sestra Anunciata (1934, as V. M. Vlček)
- U brány milosrdných (1937, as V. M. Vlček)
- Za vznešeným cílem (1944)
