= Women in the Czech Republic =

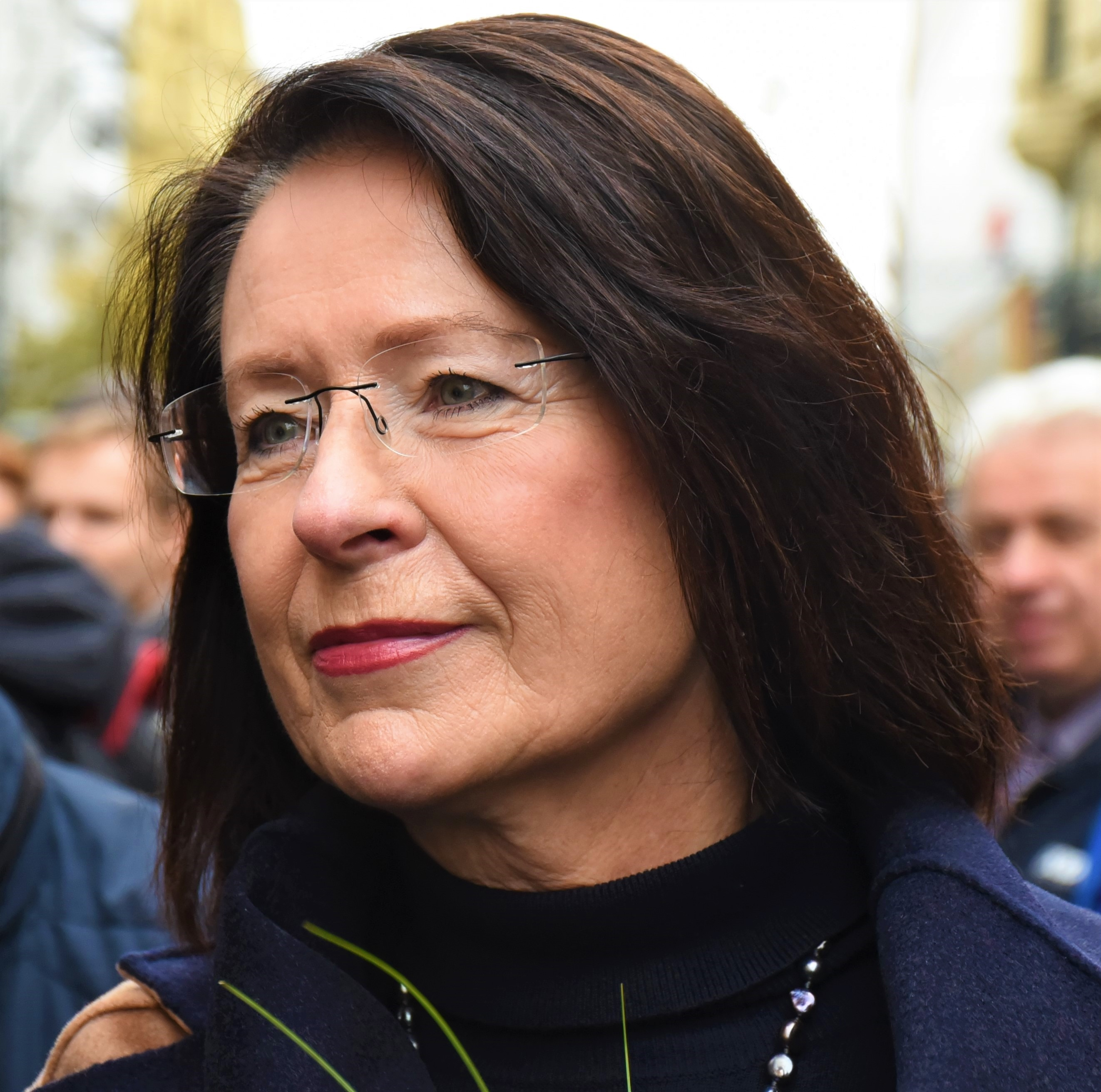
- Miroslava Němcová, former Speaker of the Chamber of Deputies and current Czech Senator

General statistics
- Maternal mortality (per 100,000): 3 (2017)
- Women in parliament: 25% (2021)
- Women over 25 with secondary education: 99.9% (2012)
- Women in labour force: 68.1% (employment rate OECD definition, 2019)

Gender Inequality Index
- Value: 0.120 (2021)
- Rank: 34th out of 191

Global Gender Gap Index
- Value: 0.710 (2022)
- Rank: 76th out of 146

The Czech Republic provides a wide variety of civil rights to female citizens and Czech women have a long history of actively participating in Czech society. However, women in the Czech Republic continue to experience gender discrimination, particularly in the workforce and political arena.

== Right to vote ==
Women have possessed the right to vote in modern-day Czechia since its creation, although Czech women were involved in earlier suffrage movements in the Austro-Hungarian Empire. Women were given the right to vote in Czechoslovakia in 1920 with the passage of the Constitution by the National Assembly of Czechoslovakia. This right was promised earlier in 1918 in the "Washington Declaration" written by Tomáš Masaryk, the first president of Czechoslovakia. This decision followed a suffrage movement within Austria-Hungary with prominent Czech suffragists including Františka Plamínková, Marie Tůmová, and Charlotte Garrigue Masaryk. The Czech suffrage movement was strongly tied to the nationalist movement promoting independence. While the right to vote was not codified into law until the 1920 Constitution, female candidates were featured in Czech elections in the early 1920s. Božena Viková-Kunětická became the first woman to be elected to office in 1912.

== Reproductive rights and family life ==
Abortion is legal in the Czech Republic up until 12 weeks of pregnancy. Czech women can get abortions by request during this period and abortions can be performed to save the mother's life or in cases of rape or incest up until 24 weeks after gestation. The majority of Czech citizens, 79% in May 2023, believe abortion should be allowed at a woman's request. As abortion rights were severely restricted in neighboring Poland in 2021, Czech activists founded Ciocia Czesia (or Auntie Czech) to assist Polish women in traveling to Czech Republic to receive safe abortions.

Giving birth in Czech Republic is a relatively safe procedure with low maternal mortality and infant mortality rates. The maternal mortality rate in Czech Republic is 3 deaths/100,000 live births (as of 2017) and the infant mortality rate is 2.42 deaths/1,000 live births, one of the lowest in the world. The HIV/AIDS rate is less than 0.1% of adults (aged 15–49). The total fertility rate (TFR) is 1.49 children born/woman (2021 estimates). As in many other European countries, family formation has become more liberal. Unmarried cohabitation has increased and the connection between fertility and marriage has decreased in the past few decades; as of 2017, 49% of births in the Czech Republic were to unmarried women.

== Labor force participation ==
Many Czech women have full-time jobs and at the same time focus on work in the private sphere, giving themselves "a high sense of personal efficacy and independence" within Czech society. The World Bank estimates that the Czech Republic's female labor force participation rate for those 15 years or older was 52.81% in 2019. Czech Republic lags behind other European nations in terms of overall gender equality in the workplace. Gender segregation remains prevalent in the Czech Republic with women taking on jobs associated with traditional gender roles. Approximately 25% of women work in education, human health, and social services activities compared to 5% of men. Furthermore, the overall full time equivalent (FTE) female employment rate of 49% is significantly lower than the male FTE employment rate at 67%.

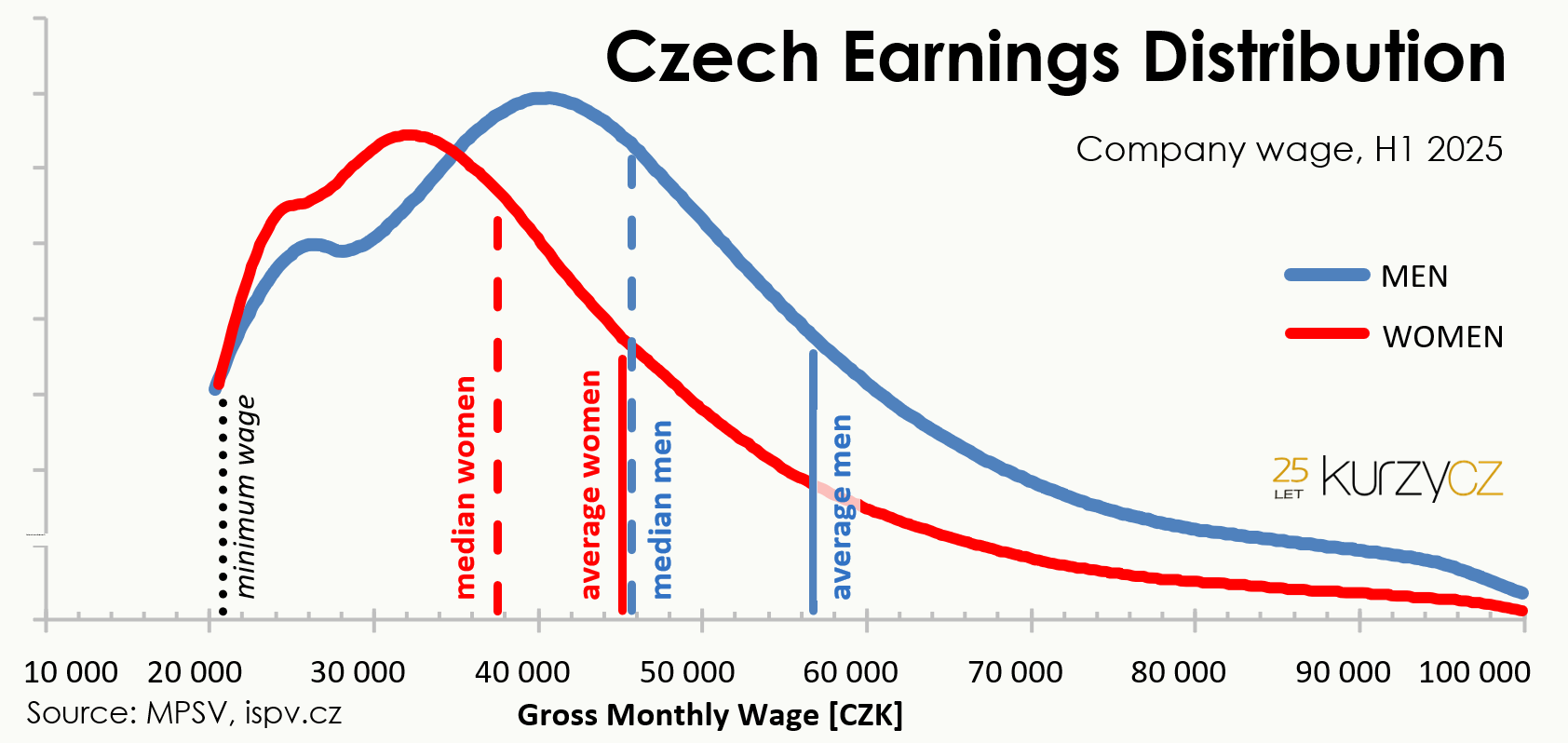
Men's and women's salaries in the Czech Republic, 2025

There exists a significant gender pay gap in the Czech Republic. Women in the Czech Republic earn approximately 18.9% less than their male colleagues, putting the Czech Republic below the EU average gender pay gap of 14.1%. Men are more likely to serve in leadership positions in the workforce compared to women with approximately 5 times more men than women serving on the boards of publicly owned companies. Parenthood is thought to be a major driver of the gender pay gap within the Czech Republic. Czech Republic mandates paid maternity leave for mothers for at least 28 weeks following the birth of a child. This leave is extended to 37 weeks in the case of twins or multiple births. Women are required to take maternity leave beginning 6 weeks before the expected birth of a child. Paid paternity leave is offered in the Czech Republic, but it is significantly shorter than standard maternity leave at 10 days. The Chamber of Deputies voted to expand paid paternity leave to 2 weeks following the birth of a child in 2021.

== Political participation ==
Although women have participated in Czech politics since the nation's establishment, Czech women are politically underrepresented at both the regional and national level. Czech Republic has not elected a female president or prime minister since its formation. As of December 2021, three women serve in Prime Minister Petr Fiala's cabinet - Jana Černochová serves as the Minister of Defense, Anna Hubáčková serves as the Minister for the Environment, and Helena Langšádlová serves as the Minister for Science, Research, and Innovation.

Female politicians currently hold 25% of seats in the Czech Parliament and 21% of seats in regional assemblies. Markéta Pekarová Adamová has served as the Speaker of the Chamber of Deputies since 2021 and leader of the TOP 09 political party since 2019. While Czech women remain underrepresented, the amount of female candidates and politicians elected to the national government has steadily increased in the last few decades. In the 2021 election for the Chamber of Deputies, approximately 31.7% of candidates were female, the greatest amount of female candidates to run in this race in the nation's history. Czech Republic does not have any legislatively mandated gender quotas, but voluntary party quotas to increase female representation are instituted within some political parties. The actual effectiveness of these voluntary party quotas is debated. The Czech government previously opposed the implementation of EU gender quotas that would require 40% of board positions in publicity owned companies to go to women.

== Education ==
Czech Republic has a very high literacy rate, which is the same for women and men at 99% (2011 estimates). However, more men (95%) than women (92%) have completed high-school (OECD 2014). There is a significant number of women in higher educational institutions as more than 60% of bachelor's and master's graduates were female in 2013. While overall tertiary educational attainment for Czech women is high, female enrollment rates for Science, Technology, Engineering, and Mathematics (STEM) degrees remains relatively low.

== See also ==
- Gender roles in post-communist Central and Eastern Europe
- Women in Europe
