= Karla Máchová =

Czech women's rights activist, and politician (1853–1920)

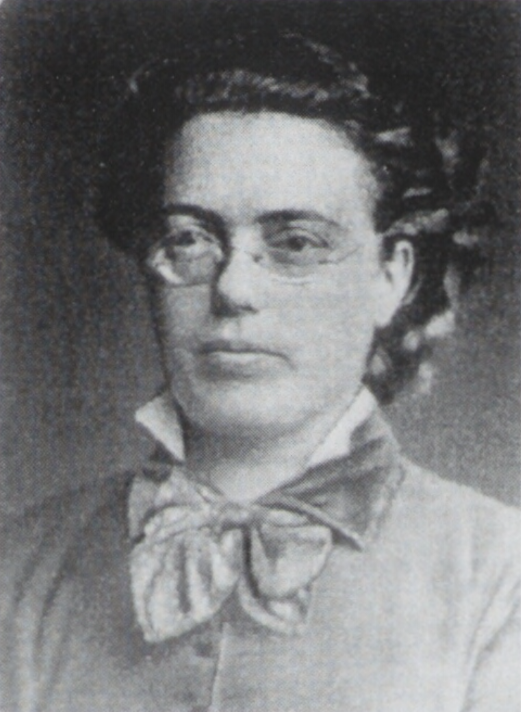
- Born: 21 October 1853; Beroun, Austrian Empire
- Died: 16 May 1920; Prague, Czechoslovakia
- Occupation(s): teacher, women's rights activist, journalist, politician

Karla Máchová (married Kostelecká; 21 October 1853 – 16 May 1920) was a Czech teacher, women's rights activist, journalist and politician. In 1908, using a legal loophole, Máchová was among the first three women to run for the Bohemian Diet.

== Early life and education ==
Karla Máchová was born on 21 October 1853, in Beroun. Her parents died when she was young, so she was brought up in an orphanage in Prague. She had to start working early to pay for her education. She studied to become a teacher and began giving lessons while still attending school.

== Career ==
Máchová worked as a teacher and took on an active role in Czech women's and teachers' associations as well as in the Social Democratic Party. She advocated for women's rights in families, society, politics and education. In 1881, she was barred from teaching in state schools due to her political activism; from then on she supported herself with tutoring, journalistic work and translations. A year later Máchová met Charlotte Garrigue, with whom she became close friends and activist allies. She was also close to Karolina Světlá.

In 1893, Máchová traveled to the United States, where she participated in the World's Congress of Representative Women and spoke up about the hardships of Bohemia's working-class women. She spent four years abroad, joined a local Czech women's association and, together with Czech-American feminist Jozefína Humpal-Zemanová, launched Ženské Listy (Women's Gazette) – the first magazine created for Czech women living in the United States.

Back in Bohemia and prompted by Tomáš Masaryk, Máchová helped with founding of the Masaryk Workers' Academy. She also organised a women's section of the Social Democrats. Máchová was a gifted speaker and in 1905 she began giving speeches at the Social Democrats' meetings advocating for women's suffrage. In the years 1901–1914 she was the editor-in-chief of the Social Democrat women's magazine, then from 1916 she was at the helm of a magazine called Zájmy žen.

In 1908, using a legal loophole, together with Božena Zelinková and Marie Tůmová, Máchová was among the first three women to run for the Bohemian Diet. Even though she received a second spot on the Social Democrat list, her party did not invite her to its large pre-election meeting, creating for her a perfunctory women's meeting instead. She ran in the Hradčany-Vyšehrad-Holešovice voting district and received almost 500 votes – close to the number gained by her colleague from the party and the highest number of votes out of the three women candidates. None of the women candidates secured a seat in the parliament, but the general public was shocked by how many votes had been cast in their favour. A couple years later Social Democrats nominated Máchová again for a freed seat in the Diet, but it went to Božena Viková-Kunětická who thus became the first woman elected to the Bohemian parliament.

== Illness and death ==
Due to health issues, Máchová did not participate in the political scene of the nascent Czechoslovak Republic.

Máchová died on 16 May 1920, in Prague.
