= Semtěš =

- Municipality
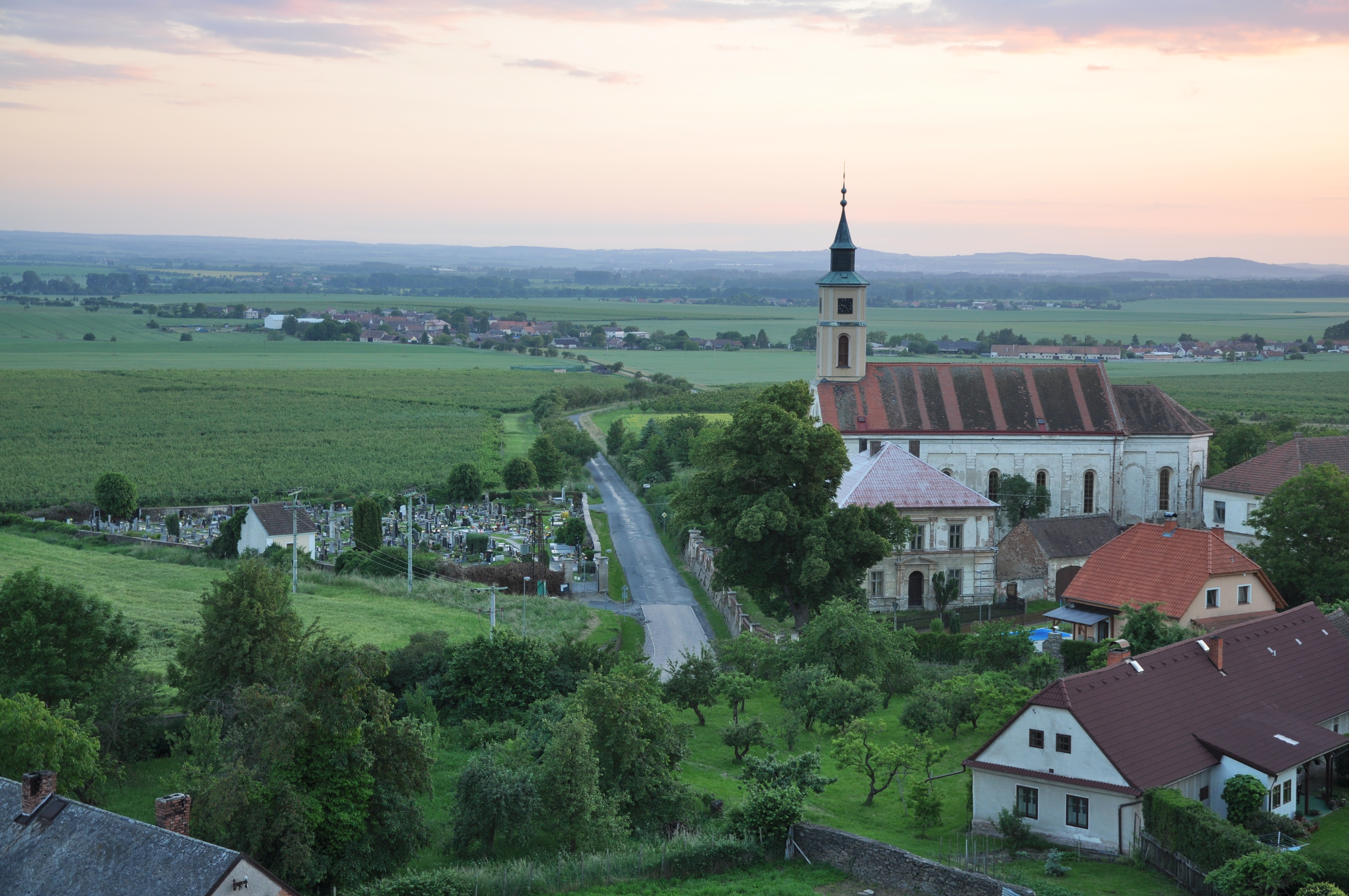
- View towards the Protestant church

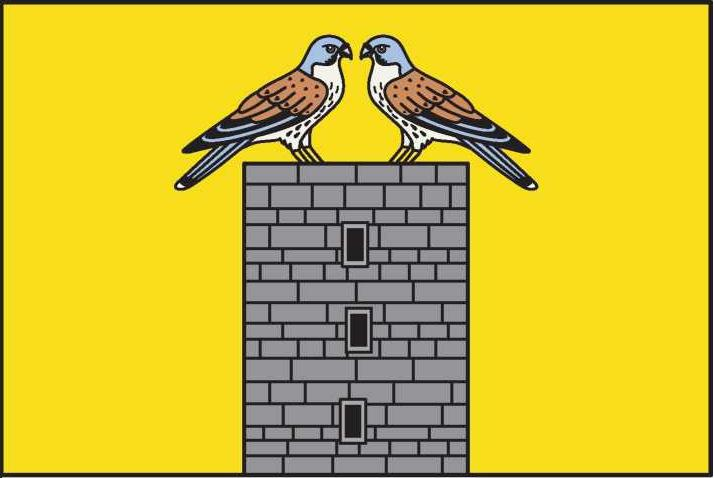
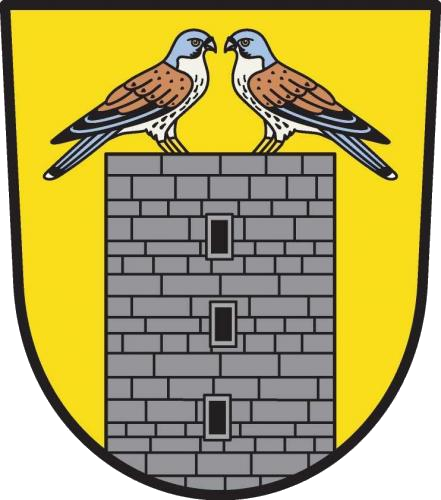
- Flag Coat of arms

- Location in the Czech Republic
- Coordinates: 49°57′36″N 15°30′52″E
- Country: Czech Republic
- Region: Central Bohemian
- District: Kutná Hora
- First mentioned: 1322

Area
  - Total: 5.01 km^{2} (1.93 sq mi)
- Elevation: 369 m (1,211 ft)

Population (2026-01-01)
  - Total: 276
  - Density: 55.1/km^{2} (143/sq mi)
- Time zone: UTC+1 (CET)
  - Summer (DST): UTC+2 (CEST)
- Postal code: 286 01
- Website: www.semtes.cz

Semtěš is a municipality and village in Kutná Hora District in the Central Bohemian Region of the Czech Republic. It has about 300 inhabitants.

== Demographics ==
Historical population
Year	Pop.	±%
1869	627	—
1880	668	+6.5%
1890	671	+0.4%
1900	648	−3.4%
1910	607	−6.3%
1921	608	+0.2%
1930	517	−15.0%
1950	417	−19.3%
1961	405	−2.9%
1970	364	−10.1%
1980	331	−9.1%
1991	290	−12.4%
2001	278	−4.1%
2011	249	−10.4%
2021	276	+10.8%
Source: Censuses

== Notable people ==
- Božena Zelinková (1869–1936), women's rights activist
