= Náklo =

- Municipality
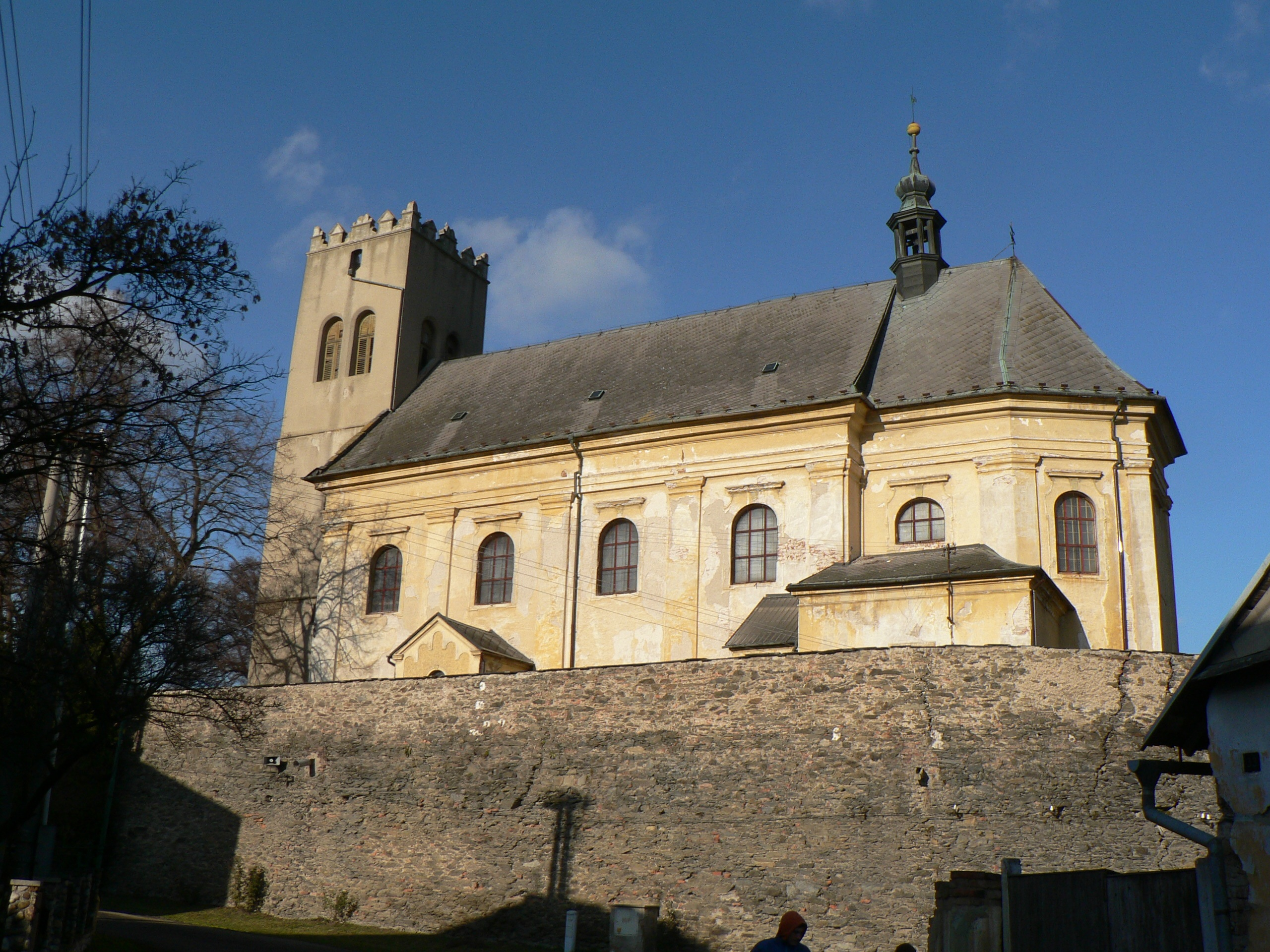
- Church of Saint George

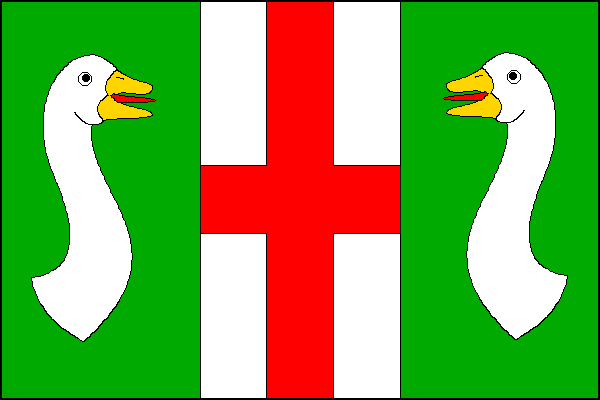
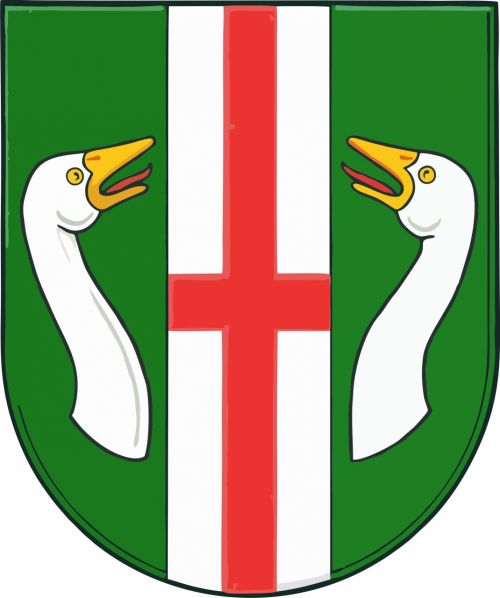
- Flag Coat of arms

- Location in the Czech Republic
- Coordinates: 49°39′17″N 17°7′47″E
- Country: Czech Republic
- Region: Olomouc
- District: Olomouc
- First mentioned: 1078

Area
  - Total: 11.45 km^{2} (4.42 sq mi)
- Elevation: 225 m (738 ft)

Population (2026-01-01)
  - Total: 1,494
  - Density: 130.5/km^{2} (337.9/sq mi)
- Time zone: UTC+1 (CET)
  - Summer (DST): UTC+2 (CEST)
- Postal code: 783 32
- Website: www.naklo.cz

Náklo (German: Nakel) is a municipality and village in Olomouc District in the Olomouc Region of the Czech Republic. It has about 1,500 inhabitants.

Náklo lies approximately 12 kilometres (7 mi) north-west of Olomouc and 201 km (125 mi) east of Prague.

== Administrative division ==
Náklo consists of three municipal parts (in brackets population according to the 2021 census):

- Náklo (961)
- Lhota nad Moravou (114)
- Mezice (353)

== Demographics ==
Historical population
Year	Pop.	±%
1869	1,486	—
1880	1,656	+11.4%
1890	1,773	+7.1%
1900	1,805	+1.8%
1910	1,843	+2.1%
1921	1,920	+4.2%
1930	1,907	−0.7%
1950	1,503	−21.2%
1961	1,551	+3.2%
1970	1,422	−8.3%
1980	1,425	+0.2%
1991	1,325	−7.0%
2001	1,422	+7.3%
2011	1,449	+1.9%
2021	1,428	−1.4%
Source: Censuses

== Notable people ==
- Zdeňka Wiedermannová-Motyčková (1868–1915), women's rights activist
- Jan Opletal (1915–1939), student, symbol of the Czech resistance against Nazism
