= Přibyslav =

- Town
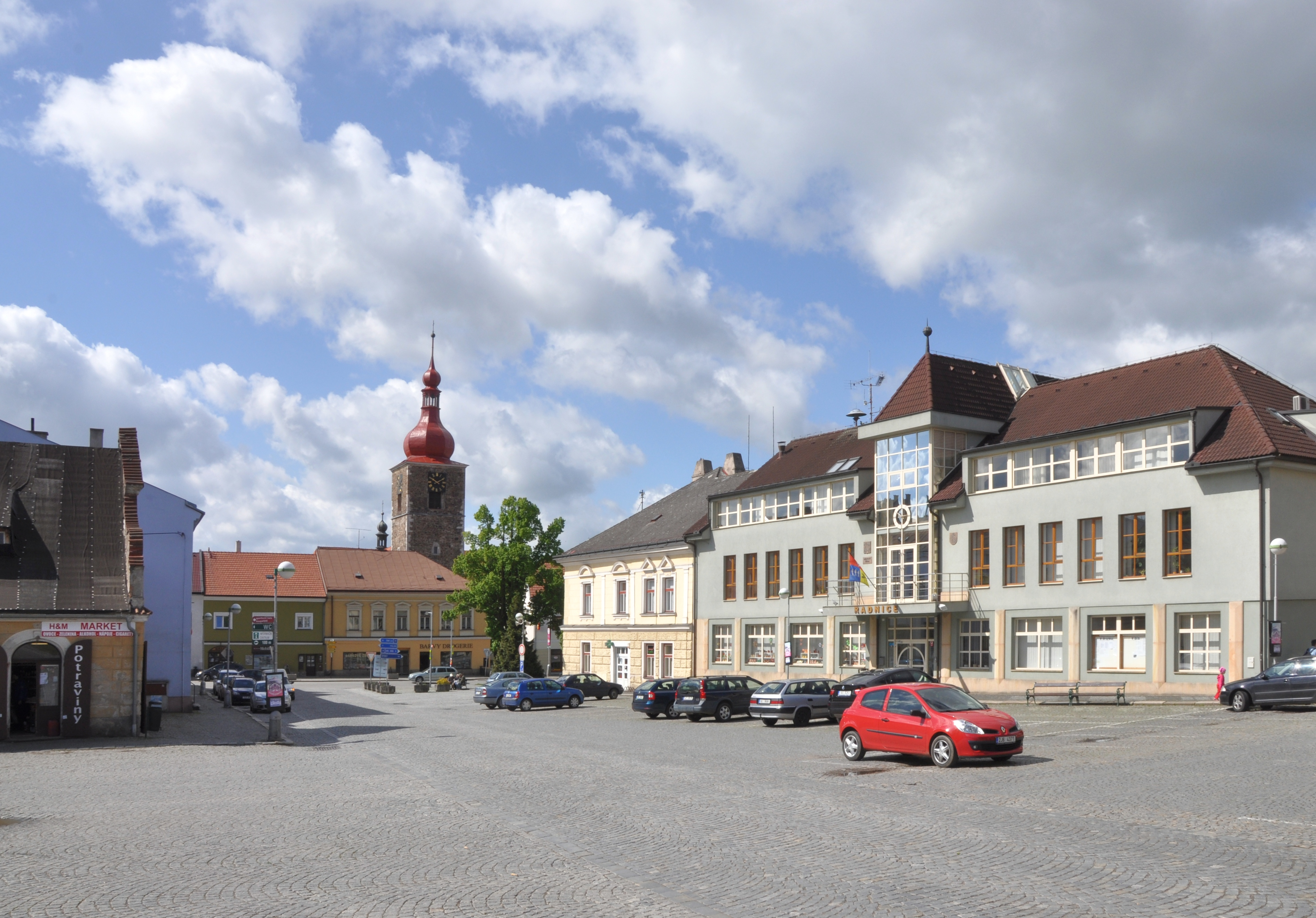
- Town square

- Flag Coat of arms

- Location in the Czech Republic
- Coordinates: 49°34′37″N 15°44′19″E
- Country: Czech Republic
- Region: Vysočina
- District: Havlíčkův Brod
- First mentioned: 1257

Government
  - Mayor: Martin Kamarád (ODS)

Area
  - Total: 35.32 km^{2} (13.64 sq mi)
- Elevation: 475 m (1,558 ft)

Population (2026-01-01)
  - Total: 3,997
  - Density: 113.2/km^{2} (293.1/sq mi)
- Time zone: UTC+1 (CET)
  - Summer (DST): UTC+2 (CEST)
- Postal code: 582 22
- Website: www.pribyslav.cz

Přibyslav (Czech pronunciation: [ˈpr̝̊ɪbɪslaf]; German: Primislau) is a town in Havlíčkův Brod District in the Vysočina Region of the Czech Republic. It has about 4,000 people. The town is located on the Sázava River in the Upper Sázava Hills. The historic town centre is well preserved and is protected as an urban monument zone.

== Administrative division ==
Přibyslav consists of eight municipal parts (in brackets population according to the 2021 census):

- Přibyslav (2,926)
- Česká Jablonná (101)
- Dobrá (363)
- Dolní Jablonná (97)
- Hřiště (83)
- Poříčí (90)
- Ronov nad Sázavou (110)
- Utín (53)

== Etymology ==
The name of the town was taken from the personal name Přibyslav. It was probably founded by someone named Přibyslav.

== Geography ==
Přibyslav is located about 11 kilometres (7 mi) east of Havlíčkův Brod and 21 km (13 mi) northeast of Jihlava. It lies in the Upper Sázava Hills. The highest point is a hill at 592 m (1,942 ft) above sea level. The town is situated on the right bank of the Sázava River. There are several fishponds in the municipal territory, supplied by streams that flow into the Sázava.

=== Climate ===
Climate data for Přibyslav (1991–2020)
Month	Jan	Feb	Mar	Apr	May	Jun	Jul	Aug	Sep	Oct	Nov	Dec	Year
Record high °C (°F)	15.4 (59.7)	15.6 (60.1)	23.0 (73.4)	26.0 (78.8)	30.5 (86.9)	33.0 (91.4)	34.2 (93.6)	35.8 (96.4)	31.9 (89.4)	24.7 (76.5)	16.1 (61.0)	12.6 (54.7)	35.8 (96.4)
Mean daily maximum °C (°F)	0.5 (32.9)	2.4 (36.3)	7.0 (44.6)	13.0 (55.4)	17.5 (63.5)	20.8 (69.4)	23.2 (73.8)	23.3 (73.9)	17.6 (63.7)	11.6 (52.9)	5.4 (41.7)	1.0 (33.8)	11.9 (53.4)
Daily mean °C (°F)	−2.0 (28.4)	−1.0 (30.2)	2.6 (36.7)	7.8 (46.0)	12.4 (54.3)	15.8 (60.4)	17.6 (63.7)	17.5 (63.5)	12.7 (54.9)	7.7 (45.9)	3.1 (37.6)	−1.1 (30.0)	7.8 (46.0)
Mean daily minimum °C (°F)	−4.7 (23.5)	−4.2 (24.4)	−1.1 (30.0)	2.6 (36.7)	6.9 (44.4)	10.0 (50.0)	11.7 (53.1)	11.7 (53.1)	8.1 (46.6)	4.3 (39.7)	0.6 (33.1)	−3.4 (25.9)	3.5 (38.3)
Record low °C (°F)	−25.1 (−13.2)	−23.6 (−10.5)	−17.9 (−0.2)	−9.6 (14.7)	−4.2 (24.4)	−1.7 (28.9)	2.5 (36.5)	3.2 (37.8)	−2.7 (27.1)	−8.6 (16.5)	−15.5 (4.1)	−26.4 (−15.5)	−26.4 (−15.5)
Average precipitation mm (inches)	42.2 (1.66)	35.8 (1.41)	43.9 (1.73)	35.2 (1.39)	75.6 (2.98)	75.0 (2.95)	92.7 (3.65)	80.3 (3.16)	59.8 (2.35)	44.2 (1.74)	41.8 (1.65)	42.1 (1.66)	668.6 (26.32)
Average precipitation days (≥ 1.0 mm)	9.7	8.3	10.1	7.0	10.5	10.1	11.1	9.3	8.3	8.5	8.7	10.1	111.7
Mean monthly sunshine hours	52.6	79.8	128.8	190.5	220.3	221.4	237.3	234.2	164.8	107.7	46.7	41.1	1,725.2
Source: NOAA

== History ==
The first written mention of Přibyslav is from 1257. Until the Hussite Wars, it was a small mining town known for silver mining. After the wars, the mining was never successfully renewed. During the Hussite Wars, Přibyslav was a military base of the Hussites. The town was often severely affected by wars and by frequent fires, which destroyed many historically valuable buildings. The most devastating fire occurred in 1767.

== Demographics ==
Historical population

Year	Pop.	±%
1869	3,857	—
1880	4,088	+6.0%
1890	4,009	−1.9%
1900	4,086	+1.9%
1910	4,200	+2.8%

Year	Pop.	±%
1921	3,859	−8.1%
1930	3,732	−3.3%
1950	3,933	+5.4%
1961	3,953	+0.5%
1970	3,893	−1.5%

Year	Pop.	±%
1980	4,049	+4.0%
1991	4,028	−0.5%
2001	3,982	−1.1%
2011	3,864	−3.0%
2021	3,823	−1.1%

Source: Censuses

== Economy ==
The largest employer based in the town is ACO Industries, a manufacturer of drainage systems. It employs more than 500 people.

== Transport ==
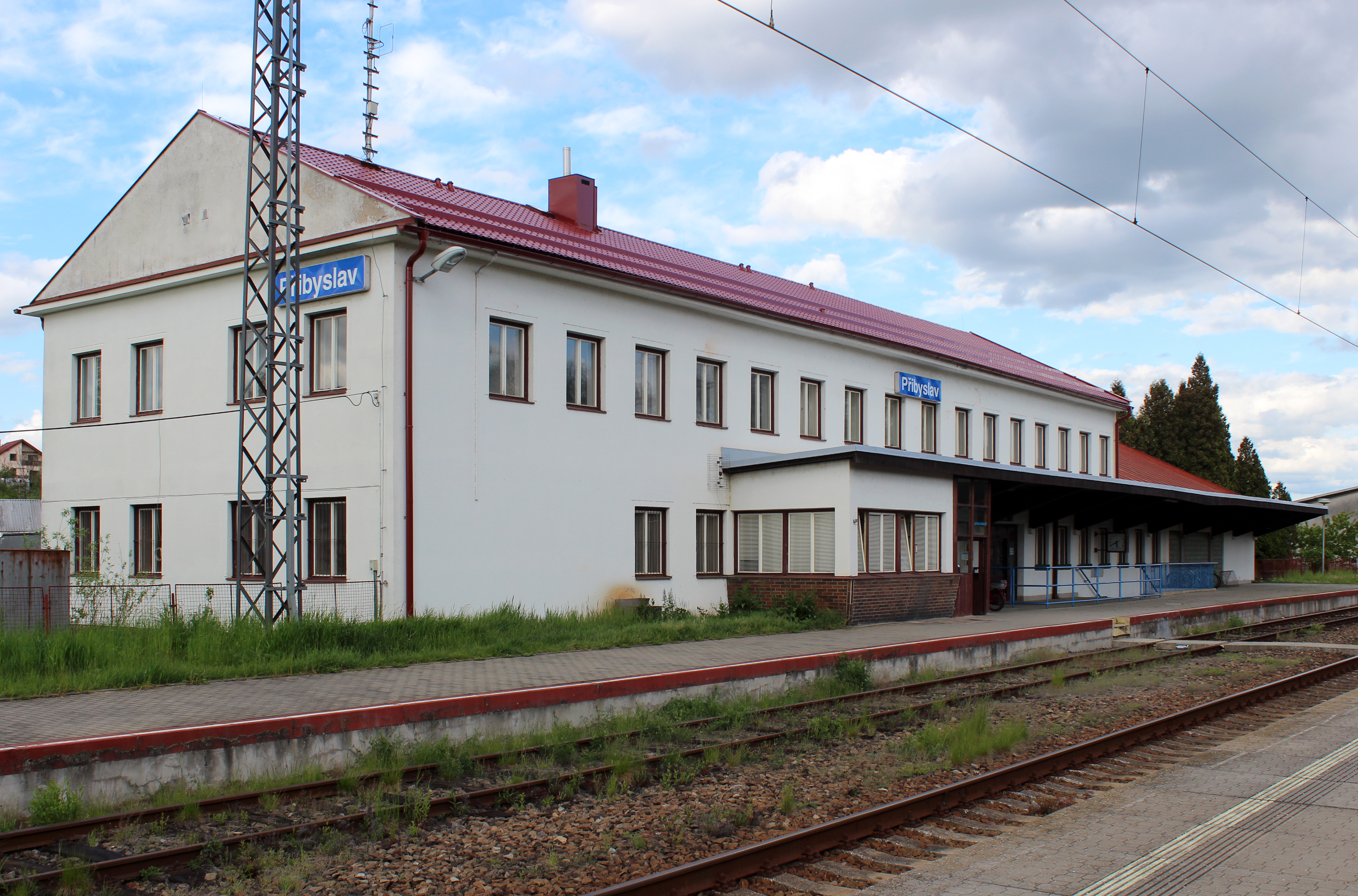
Train station

The I/19 road (the section from Havlíčkův Brod to Žďár nad Sázavou) runs through the town.

Přibyslav is located on an important railway line heading from Prague to Brno.

== Sights ==
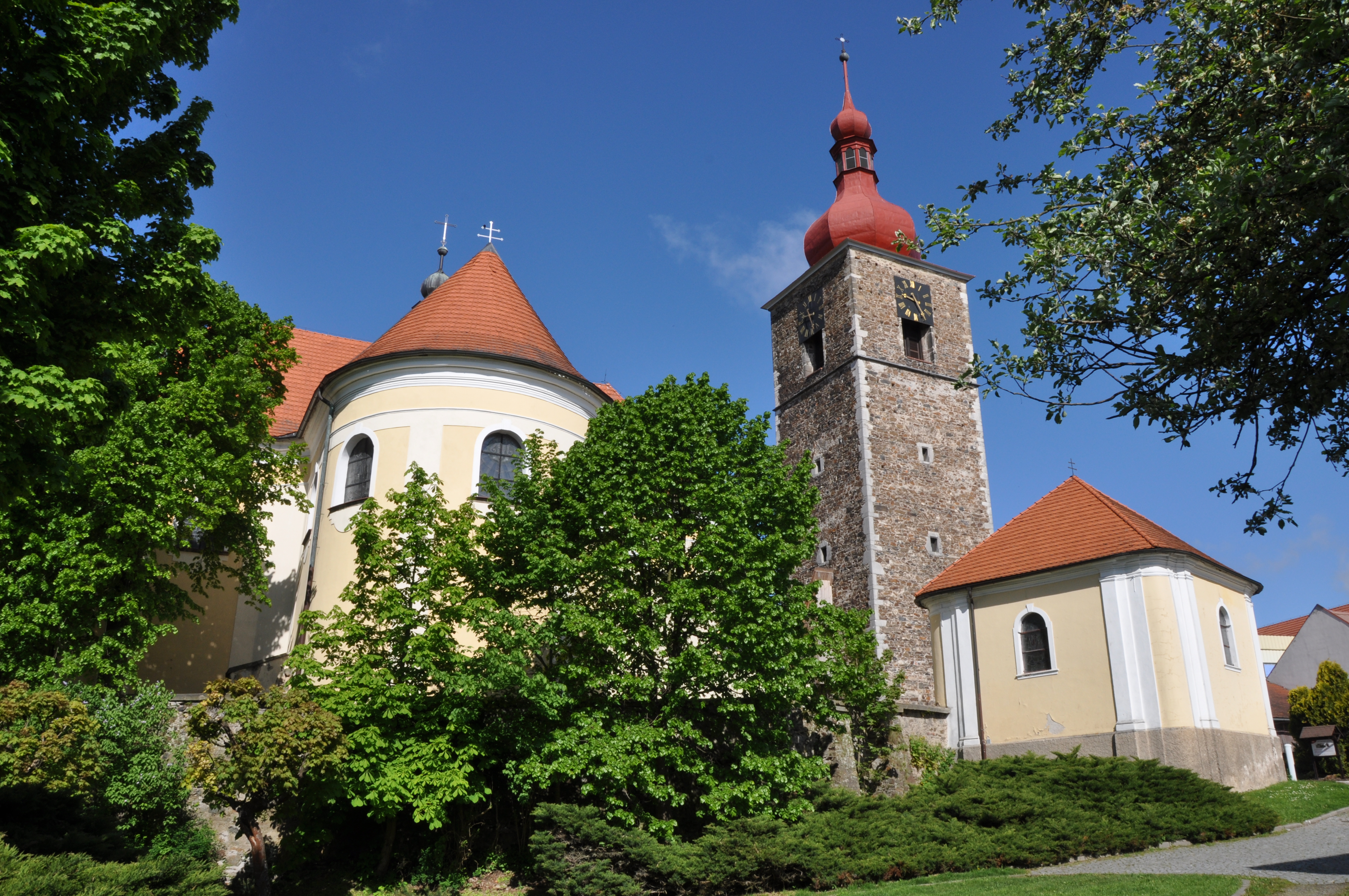
The tower with the church

The oldest building in the town is a Gothic tower from 1497, which is the only remnant of a medieval church. Next to the tower is the Church of the Nativity of Saint John the Baptist, built in the Baroque style in 1750–1753.

The Přibyslav Castle was built in the Renaissance style 1560 by Zachariáš of Hradec. There are two courtyards in the castle. The older one is valuable by columns in the Tuscan style. Today the castle houses the Fireman Museum.

An equestrian statue of Jan Žižka by Bohumil Kafka from 1935 is located in the town park. It is a smaller model of the larger statue, which is part of the National Monument at Vítkov in Prague.

== Notable people ==
- Jan Otto (1841–1916), publisher and bookseller
- Josef Reinsberg (1844–1930), medical doctor
- Jan Filip (1911–1971), priest, writer and Esperantist
- Jan Bechyně (1920–1973), entomologist
- Jaromír Málek (1943–2023), Egyptologist
- Hana Orgoníková (1946–2014), politician

== Twin towns – sister cities ==
Přibyslav is twinned with:

- Mook en Middelaar, Netherlands
- Sliač, Slovakia
