= Jaroslav Čihák =

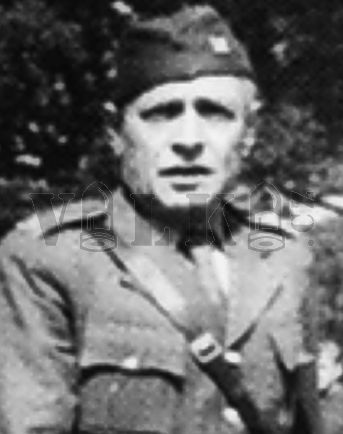
Jaroslav Čihák

Major general Jaroslav Čihák (24 July 1891 – 30 April 1944) was a Czech military commander. He was an army officer in the Austro-Hungarian Army from 1914, Russian legionary from 1916, and later Brigadier General/Chief of Staff of the Ministry of National Defence for the Czechoslovak government-in-exile.

== Life and career ==
Čihák was born in Kratonohy. While serving in the Austro-Hungarian Army, he was captured by the Russians in September 1916, after which he joined the Czechoslovak Legion. From 1920 to 1923, Čihák served as the commander of the 9th Mountain Battalion, and from 1923-1925 as the commander for the 6th Mountain Infantry Battalion. Čihák commanded the 5th Mountain Infantry Battalion from October 1925 until 1926, at which point he joined the War School in Prague to teach infantry tactics until 1928. From 1928-1930 he served as the deputy commander of the 28th Infantry Regiment in Prague. Čihák later commanded the 45th Infantry Regiment in Khust from 1930-1935. He commanded the infantry training school in Milovice starting in September 1936, then was placed in command of the 21st Division at Veselí nad Moravou in the fall of 1938.

Čihák left for France in 1940, where he commanded the 1st Czechoslovak Legion and fought against Germany. In January 1941 he was appointed as the Chief of Staff (later Chairman of the Disciplinary Committee) of the Ministry of National Defense department in United Kingdom for the Czechoslovak government in exile, and also served as the chairman of the Czechoslovak Red Cross. Čihák passed away in London in 1944.
