= Františka Plamínková =

Czech feminist and suffrage activist (1875–1942)

- Born: Františka Faustina Plamínková; 5 February 1875; Prague, Bohemia, Austria-Hungary
- Died: 30 June 1942 (aged 67); Kobylisy Shooting Range, Protectorate of Bohemia and Moravia (now Prague)
- Cause of death: Execution by firing squad
- Occupations: teacher, businesswoman, suffragette, politician
- Political party: ČSNS

Františka Plamínková (5 February 1875 – 30 June 1942) was a Czech feminist and suffrage activist. Trained as a teacher, she became involved in feminism because teachers were forbidden to marry. She transitioned into journalism, writing articles about inequality. Elected to the Prague City Council and the National Assembly, she served as Senate Chair when Czechoslovakia broke away from the Austro-Hungarian Empire. She was a vice president of the International Council of Women, as well as the International Woman's Suffrage Alliance and attended many international feminist congresses. Plamínková was arrested by the Gestapo in 1942 and executed.

== Biography ==
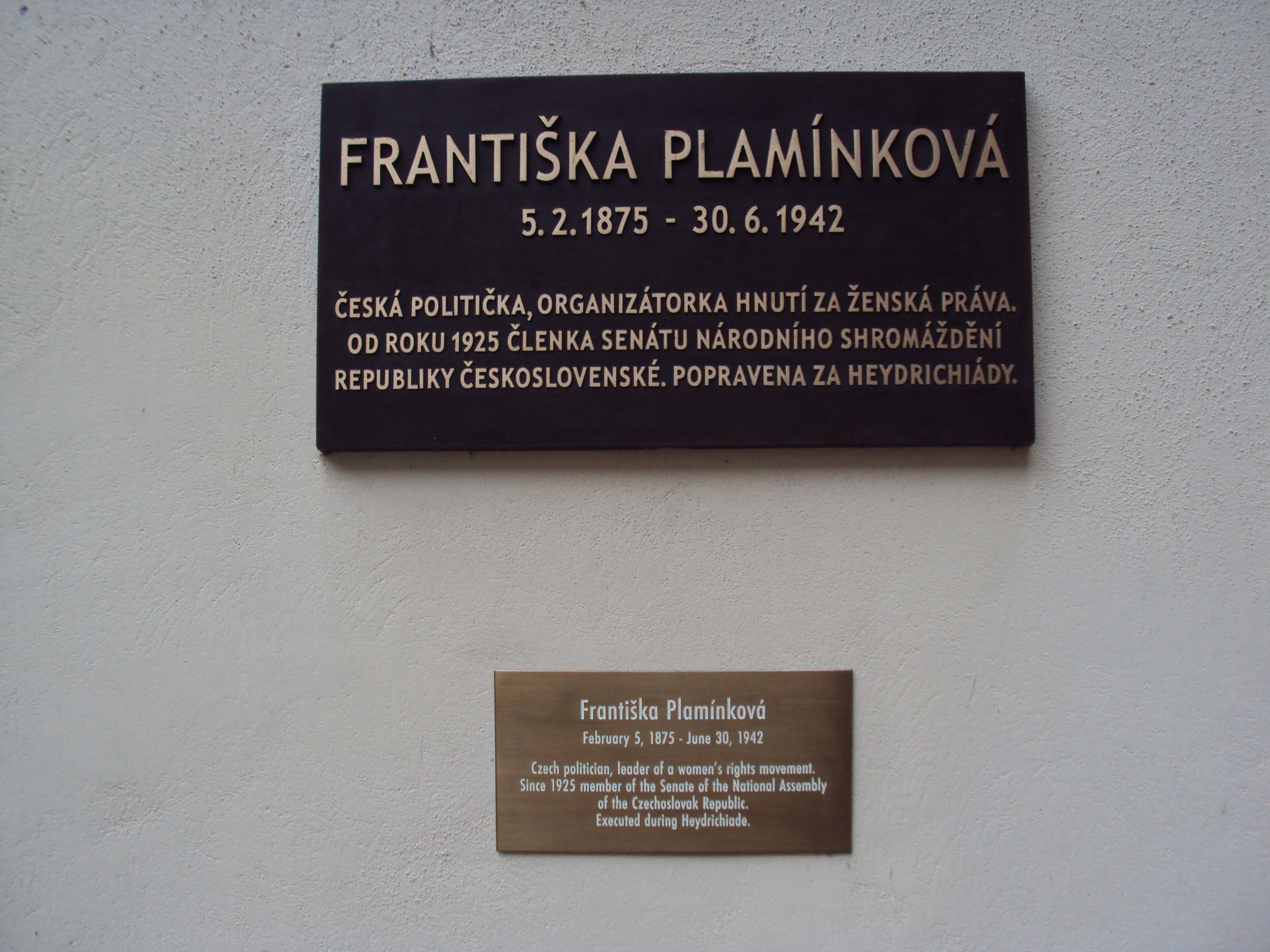
Memorial plaque to Senator Františka Plamínková in the garden of Wallenstein Palace

Františka Faustina Plamínková was born on 5 February 1875 in Prague, Austria-Hungary to Františka (née Krubnerová) and František Plamínek. Her family was of Jewish heritage. Her father was a cobbler and she was the youngest of three daughters. After completing her basic education, she attended the Prague State Teachers' Institute.

=== Teaching and early women's rights activism ===
Plamínková began teaching in 1894 at the elementary school in Tábor and then taught for the last six months of the year in Soběslav. Moving back to Prague in 1895, she completed her teaching internship in 1900 and was certified to teach drawing, mathematics, physics, and writing. She joined the Association of Czech Teachers and spoke out against the Austro-Hungarian law which forbade teachers marriage and required that they remain celibate.

In 1901, Plamínková founded the Women's Club in Prague and four years later formed the Committee for Women's Suffrage. Plamínková became the driving force behind the Czech push for enfranchisement and worked to raise the public consciousness about the need for voting rights. In their rallies, the women supported the right for universal suffrage, for men as well as women, who were denied the right to vote by Habsburg rule. In 1907, men were granted the right by the Austrian government for imperial elections, but women were denied. Plamínková realized that the local Bohemian law did not actually prohibit women at the provincial level and convinced several political parties to field female candidates; her committee put forward Marie Tůmová. Though none won, it was repeated in subsequent elections and served as a symbol of Czech nationalism. In 1912, the first woman, Božena Viková-Kunětická, was elected and though the governor invalidated the result, the election won Plamínková and the Czech feminists international recognition. During this same time, Plamínková traveled throughout Europe and served as a news correspondent in the First Balkan War.

=== Politician in the First Czechoslovak Republic ===
Attempts by Austria-Hungary at restricting liberty and quashing Czech nationalism during World War I, had the opposite result, in that they forced exiles to seek help from Western Allies to push for an independent Czechoslovakia. The "Washington Declaration" establishing the First Czechoslovak Republic abolished nobility, redistributed noble lands and provided for the separation of church and state. It also eliminated class, gender, and religious barriers, and gave women political, social and cultural parity with men. As Western Allies made the Washington Declaration a condition of declaring peace, women gained voting rights in 1918.

The changes were immediate. The law requiring teachers to remain unmarried and celibate was abolished in 1919. A member of the Czechoslovak Socialist Party, Plamínková contested the first local elections in 1919. Elected to serve on the Prague City Council, she resigned her teaching post. She was also appointed as the Czechoslovak delegate for the General Assembly of the League of Nations in Geneva. At the Geneva conference of international feminists in June 1920, Plamínková was able to report that in the first parliamentary election of 1920, 54% of the voters were women, as opposed to 46% men; 12% of the provincial posts were filled by women; 13 of the 302 members of the Chamber of Deputies were women; and 3 of the 150 Senators elected were women.

By 1923, Plamínková realized that the legislature was not interested in making corrections to the civil code which would bring forth women's equality. She founded the Women's National Council (ŽNR), which aligned with the International Woman Suffrage Alliance (IWSA) and the International Council of Women (ICW), quickly becoming an influential lobbying group. The ŽNR first focused on changing the family and marriage law hoping to attain legal equality in laws governing marriage and divorce. One of Plamínková's main goals was turning the existing paid maternity leave into an effective entitlement, since rather than getting paid the three-month benefit, women were threatened with dismissal. Another focus was a change to the code which designated the man as head of the household, putting women in the same position as children and giving them no say in their economic life or guardianship concerns. She used her writing abilities to further feminist goals, publishing in Orbis, a publishing house founded in 1923.

=== Senate member and chairperson ===
In 1925, Plamínková was elected as a vice president of the ICW. The same year, she contested the parliamentary election winning a seat in the Czechoslovak Senate, a post she would hold until 1939. By 1930, she was also serving as a vice president of the IWSA and had been re-elected to the Senate.

As the Great Depression caused worldwide economic turmoil, the Czech government came up with austerity proposals which Plamínková saw as a threat to equality. Not only were working women targeted for dismissal, but couples, whether married or living together, were threatened with pay reductions, as were single people living with their parents. The proposals applied to all jobs, both public and private and also called for curtailing benefits of couples. Plamínková and the ŽNR launched a flurry of protests at government ministers in 1933 hoping to stop the legislation. The law passed despite the protest, under the justification that in such difficult times it was impossible to support families having two jobs when there were so many people who had none at all.

Though chairperson of the Senate in 1936, Plamínková was unable to push through changes to the family code. In 1937, Plamínková called out both her own party and the legislature for failing to recognize women as citizens, instead treating them legally as only daughters, mothers and wives. The same year, news of the fate of women under the Nazi regime made it evident to Plamínkova that equality in public life under the Nazi's was impossible. While her party had taken the new name "Czechoslovak National Socialist Party" in 1926, it did not ever have any affiliation with the German National Socialists. The party did not seek collective socialism, but rather a just system of socio-economic and political equality. The party was one of the main opponents to the Communist Party of Czechoslovakia. In speaking out about the regime, she became a target of surveillance and in 1938, a failed attempt by Růžena Bednáříková-Turnwaldová to remove Plamínkova from the leadership of the ŽNR occurred. Bednáříková-Turnwaldová was a writer, editor and managing director of the Czech National Council (Czech: Národní rada česká) (NRČ), an organization which originally formed to integrate minorities’ cultural interests with the various political parties. Between 1939 and 1945, their focus was on the involvement of Czech women in the nation's history.

=== Third Reich resistance, deportation and death ===
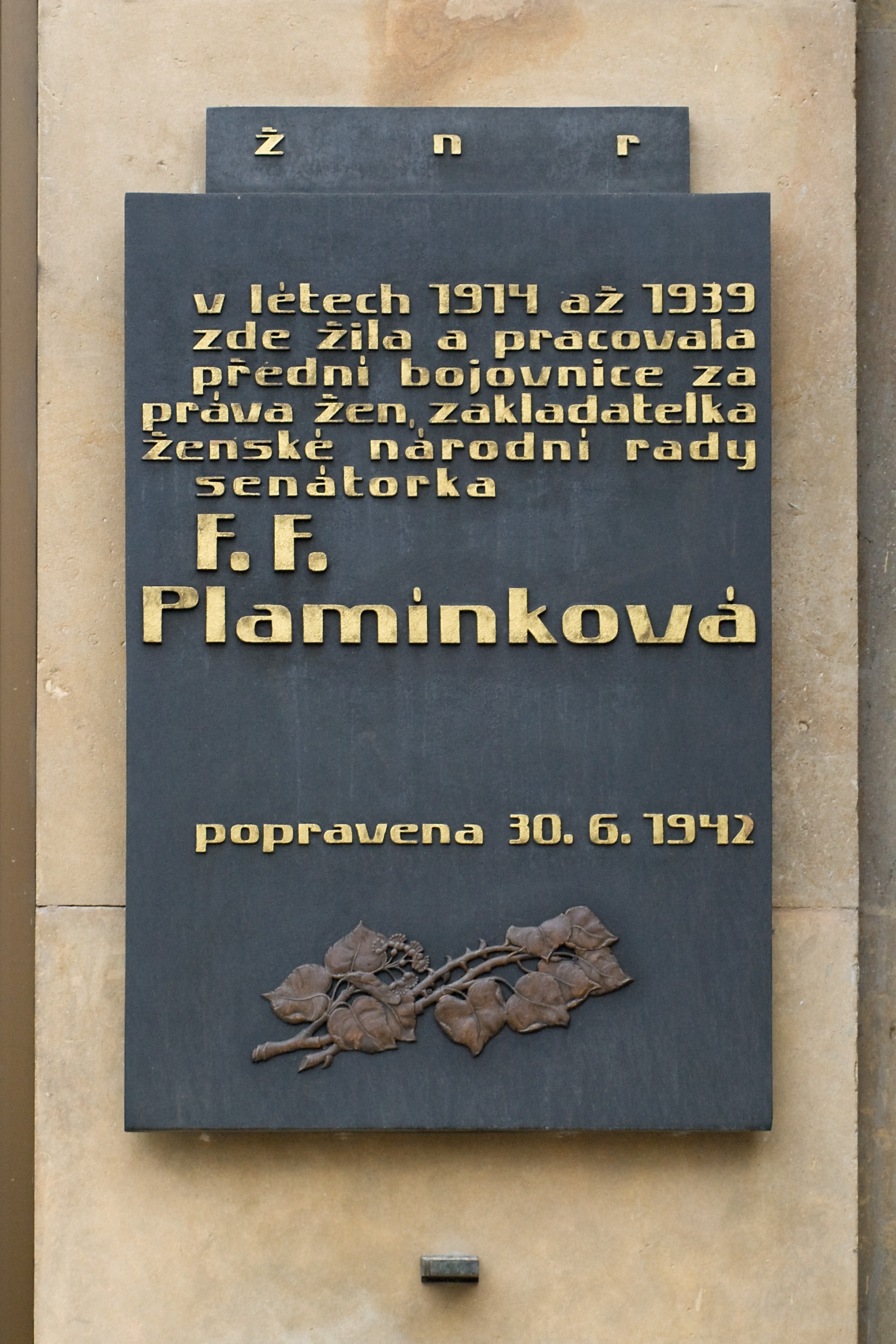
Plaque on the house in Prague where Plamínková lived and worked between 1914 and 1939

In 1938 and 1939, Hitler's troops occupied most of Czechoslovakia and the Munich Agreement was signed. Plamínková's response was to write an open letter to Hitler criticizing his regime and the rollback of liberties. Attending the Thirteenth Congress of the IWSA in Copenhagen in 1939 friends urged her to remain abroad, fearing for her safety. She refused, believing that she could best work for the Czech people from home. She was arrested by the Gestapo in 1939 and later released, though kept under surveillance.

While all other political parties in opposition to the Nazi's were officially banned, the National Partnership, as the only allowed party, attempted to convince Plamínková and the ŽNR to support their aims, but she refused preferring to have the organization work quietly to restore rights without aligning with any political stance. Misrepresenting the silence as veiled opposition to change and suppression by Plamínková, Karel Werner, a journalist and German-sympathizer, with Polední List (the Midday News) wrote an article attacking Plamínková and the ŽNR. Plamínková was furious, believing that the article would result in the demise of the women's organization. She scheduled a series of lectures hoping to promote Czech nationalism which focused on women writers, the Czech language and culture. The last lecture, on religion, was never held.

Plamínková was re-arrested in 1942 after the assassination of Reinhard Heydrich and taken to Theresienstadt concentration camp. Some reports indicated that Plamínková was hanged by the Nazis, but records of the Kobylisy Shooting Range confirm she was shot on 30 June 1942.

== Honors ==
In 1936, Czech composer Julie Reisserová dedicated Slavnostní den (lit. '"Festive Day"') to Plamínková, a female chorus she had set to her text.

Posthumously, Plamínková was honored by a tribute at the first postwar Congress of the IWSA in 1946. In 1950, she was awarded in memoriam the Golden Star, the highest rank, of the Czechoslovak Army's Order for Liberty. The Order of Tomáš Garrigue Masaryk, established in 1990 to honor Czechs who have made significant contributions to human rights was awarded to Plamínková in 1992.

In February 2016, Google commemorated the 141st anniversary of her birthday with a "Doodle".
