= Women's National Council =

Women's National Council (Czech: Ženská národní rada (ŽNR)), 1923–1942, was the only women's umbrella organization in Czechoslovakia and only official women's collective which existed in the country until after 1990. As such, it was the most significant feminist organization in the interwar period. Founded by Františka Plamínková, its members strove for reform of marriage laws and employment restrictions of women, which they believed had been promised by the equality mandate in the new constitution.

== History ==
After the founding of the Czechoslovak Republic in 1918 and passage of its constitution in 1920, Františka Plamínková, a politician who recognized the need for an effective lobbying group for women's issues, established the Women's National Council (ŽNR) in 1923. Throughout the life of the organization, Plamínková served as the president. The governing documents of the ŽNR were approved by the Ministry of the Interior on 24 February 1923, and soon after its formation joined the International Council of Women and the International Woman Suffrage Alliance. The organization was established as an umbrella organization to unite other women's organizations in gaining political and civic equality for women. Established in Prague, with a branch office in Brno, by 1935, they had fifty affiliated organizations and some 2,200 members without regard to creed, nationality or political affiliation. Most of the affiliated organizations were professional organizations of civil servants, social workers and teachers, with membership among the educated middle class. Because the organization focused on Czech women and meetings and correspondence was in Czech, women identifying as German or Slovak rarely joined, though the Slovak network, Živena and several German and Jewish organizations were members. The organization's leadership was staunchly anti-clerical, which often precluded Catholic women's organizations from participating. Politically, the membership included members of the Agrarian Party, Communist Party, National Socialist Party and Social Democratic Party, but most of the executive were aligned with the conservative National Democrats.

The ŽNR worked to educate women about their rights, as well as to mold public opinion. To that end, they worked to establish a library of materials about women both from within Czechoslovakia and abroad. The organization collected women's literature, and specifically tried to obtain information on reforms, draft laws, and pending legislation which might impact women's equality. Members were encouraged to contact legislative members, trade unions and libraries in other jurisdictions to expand the information ŽNR could offer for study to members, public officials and journalists. They also established a journal, Ženská rada (Women's advice), which was published from 1925 to 1938 and edited by Plamínková. Developing a number of departments, the organization focused on women's civil status as wives and employees, educational opportunities, family matters and parenting, legal status, morality, pacifism, personal freedom, and societal improvement. Members like Milada Horáková, Marie Svozilová and Hana Vichová devoted speeches and articles to criticize the government's failure to implement laws for equality which was constitutionally guaranteed. They demanded an end to employment discrimination on the basis of sex and insisted that equal pay for employment based on education and skill be upheld. Because the civil code designated the man as head of the household, women by law were legal dependents having the same position as children, with decision-making authority over their economic life or guardianship concerns for their children. ŽNR drafted a new civil code which called for equality of spouses as well as for their mutual care of dependents and each other. Each spouse should have the right to work and the responsibility for care of the family with equal decision-making authority, and for domestic maintenance. There should be equality in division of assets, the right of spouses to choose their legal name, the right of divorce and equal alimony regardless to the sex of the lower earning partner. Their suggestions were rejected and though the law was revised in 1931, men still maintained authority over children, property and their wives; the only substantive change being that marriage would henceforward be a civil partnership, rather than a religious rite.

With the advent of the Great Depression and austerity measures put in place at that time, ŽNR pressed for relief programs that provided assistance to the unemployed, rather than the mass dismissal of women workers. The women also worked for assistance programs for the disabled, illegitimate children and orphans, a juvenile court system, protections for women prisoners, and a comprehensive reform of unemployment schemes, specifically for the establishment of a women's unemployment fund. When the Nazi occupation began in 1938, women lost ground. Implementation of programs outlawing all political parties except the state-sponsored party, which women could not join, effectively silenced the ŽNR's ability to engage politically. State-sponsored paternalism ensured that the women's choices were curtailed and President Emil Hácha took over the appointment of the women who were to serve on the ŽNR board, some of whom were not members of the organization. The intent was to subvert the concerns of women from women's issues and point them toward state-approved activities which would benefit the state. in 1942, the organization was outlawed.
