= Kratonohy =

- Municipality
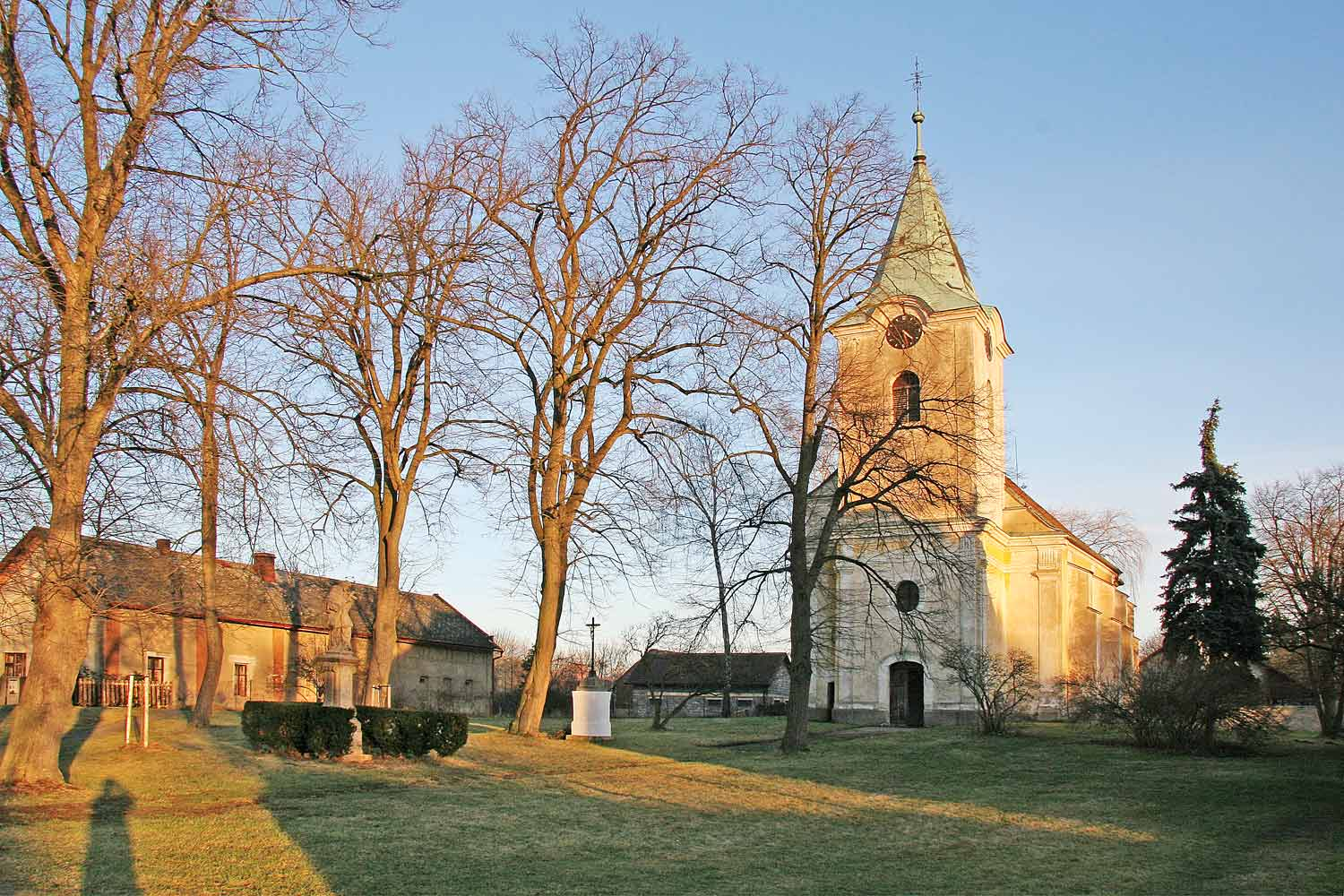
- Church of Saint James the Great

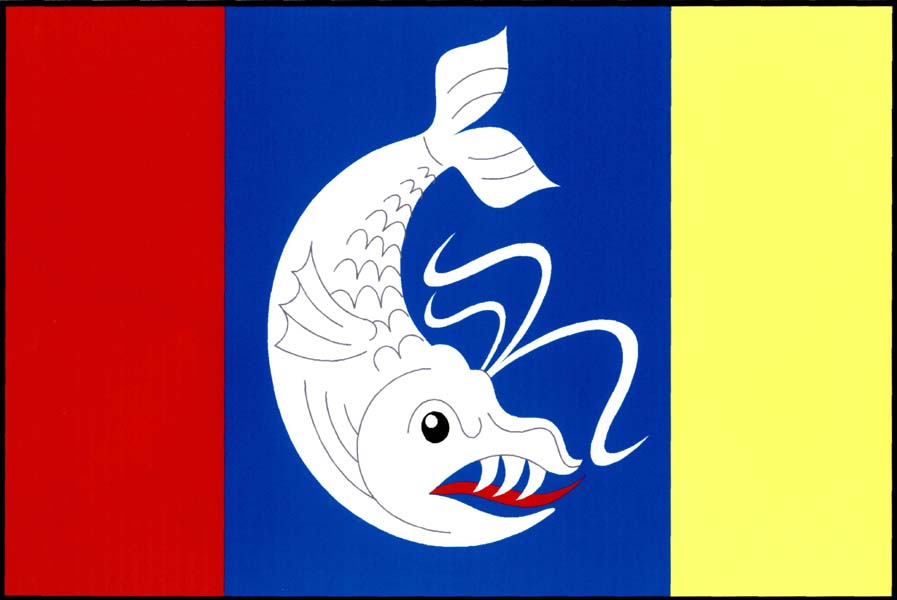
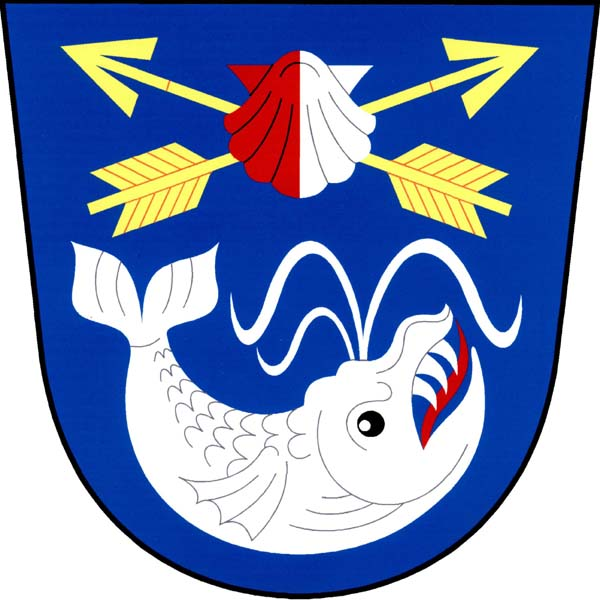
- Flag Coat of arms

- Location in the Czech Republic
- Coordinates: 50°10′9″N 15°36′25″E
- Country: Czech Republic
- Region: Hradec Králové
- District: Hradec Králové
- First mentioned: 1316

Area
  - Total: 11.34 km^{2} (4.38 sq mi)
- Elevation: 228 m (748 ft)

Population (2026-01-01)
  - Total: 645
  - Density: 56.9/km^{2} (147/sq mi)
- Time zone: UTC+1 (CET)
  - Summer (DST): UTC+2 (CEST)
- Postal code: 503 24
- Website: www.kratonohy.cz

Kratonohy is a municipality and village in Hradec Králové District in the Hradec Králové Region of the Czech Republic. It has about 600 inhabitants.

== Administrative division ==
Kratonohy consists of two municipal parts (in brackets population according to the 2021 census):

- Kratonohy (554)
- Michnovka (62)

== Etymology ==
The name of Kratonohy is derived from the Old Czech words kratonožka, kraťnoha, which were mocking designations for short-legged people. The name is believed to be originating from the 11th or the 12th century.

According to the legend which aimed to cover up the derogatory name, Kratonohy was founded by Býd, the son of Count Slavomil of Kouřim, at the place where he rested with his people for three days. The legend says that the name was derived from "shortening the legs", which figuratively meant 'tired legs'.

== Geography ==
Kratonohy is located about 15 kilometres (9 mi) west of Hradec Králové. It lies in a flat agricultural landscape in the East Elbe Table. The highest point is the hill Medenec at 281 m (922 ft) above sea level.

== History ==
The first written mention of Kratonohy is from 1316, the village of Michnovka was first mentioned in 1720. In the 14th century, a fortress probably existed here, but the oldest written record about the citadel comes from the 16th century. In the second half of the 14th century, owners of the village were the lords of Častolovice, Licek of Kratonohy and Perchta, daughter of Sezema of Kostomlaty. Perchta made a donation of some estates to St. George's Convent in Prague. From 1407 to 1467, Kratonohy was owned by Hroch of Dobřenice and brothers Jiří and Adam Dobřenský.

In 1623, Kratonohy was bought by Alžběta Vchynská of Vchynice na Chlumci. The homestead had been held by the Kinsky family to 1644, but due to mortgages, they sold it to Asterles of Asterfeld. During the 18th century, the Kratonohy estate was merged with Chlumec estate.

== Demographics ==
Historical population

Year	Pop.	±%
1869	873	—
1880	919	+5.3%
1890	923	+0.4%
1900	867	−6.1%
1910	776	−10.5%

Year	Pop.	±%
1921	800	+3.1%
1930	821	+2.6%
1950	731	−11.0%
1961	649	−11.2%
1970	567	−12.6%

Year	Pop.	±%
1980	573	+1.1%
1991	551	−3.8%
2001	548	−0.5%
2011	590	+7.7%
2021	616	+4.4%

Source: Censuses

== Transport ==
Kratonohy is located on the railway line Hradec Králové–Chlumec nad Cidlinou.

== Sights ==
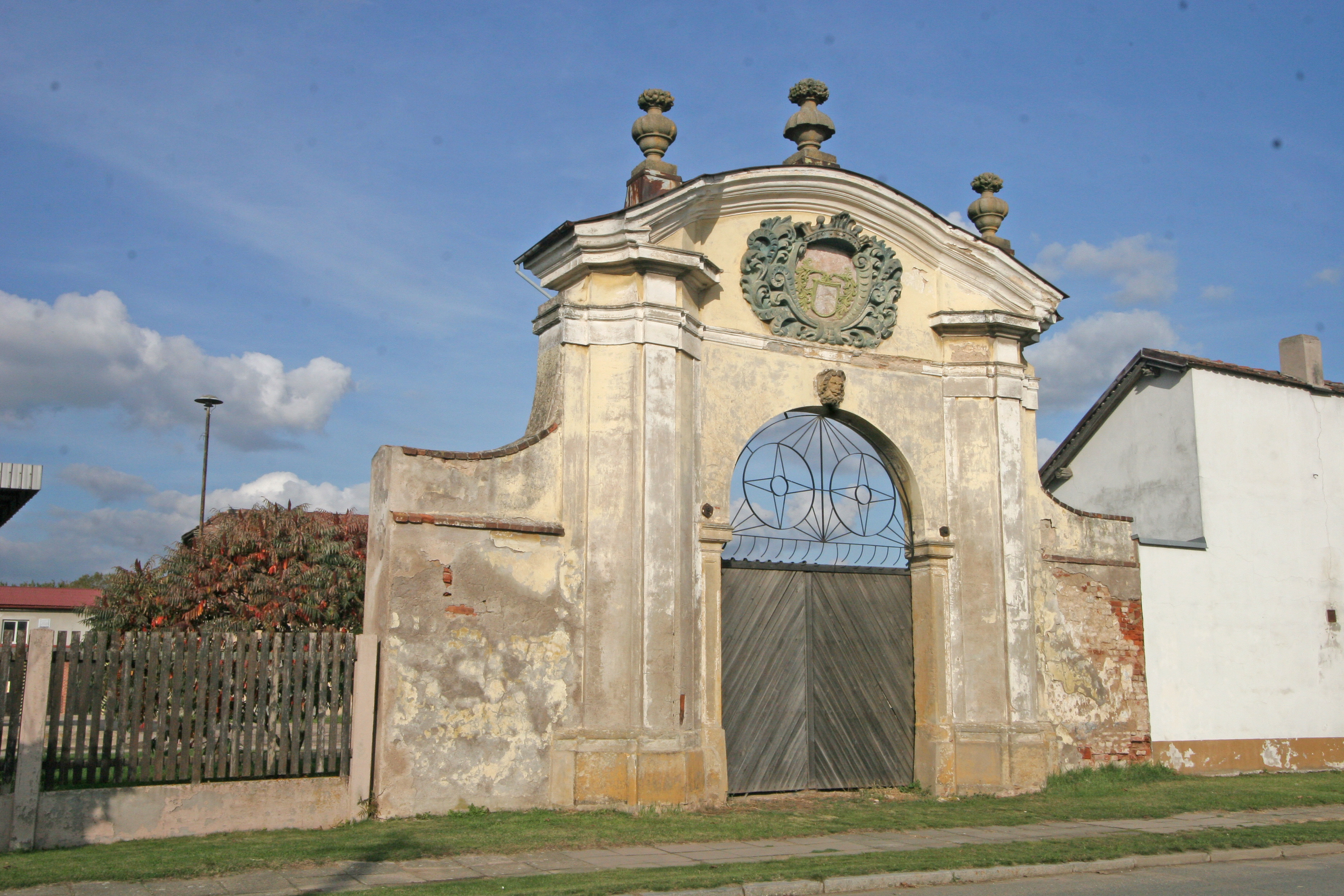
Baroque gate of the former homestead

The gate of the homestead was built after 1720 by Jan Santini Aichel or his descendants. It is now the property of an agricultural company and intensively modified.

The Church of Saint James the Great is a Gothic-based building, rebuilt in the Baroque style in 1707–1710. It has an inwrought interior with an unusual solution: the altar was made as grotto and the rostrum as whale. The altar is a reproduction of a Spanish altar of Saint James the Great from Santiago de Compostela. The wife of manor owner Jan Adam Michna from Vacínov was Spanish, thus it is believed that its interior is the work of Spanish artists. It is one of the most impressive rural church interiors in the country.

== Notable people ==
- Rudolf Medek (1890–1940), poet and writer; taught here at school in 1910–1913
- Jaroslav Čihák (1891–1944), army officer
- Petr Kostka (born 1938), actor; lived and studied here
