= Bohemian Diet =

Parliament of the former Kingdom of Bohemia

(in official languages)
Czech	Zemský sněm Království českého
German	Landtag des Königreiches Böhmen

Type
- Type: Unicameral

History
- Founded: 6 April 1861 (as a constitutional body)

Leadership
- Supreme Marshal of the Kingdom of Bohemia
- The Deputy Supreme Marshal of the Kingdom of Bohemia
- The Provincial Committee
- Seats: 214 (until 1848); 241 (from 1861); 242 (from 1882)

Elections
- Voting system: Plurality voting (Two-round system)
- Last election: The 1908 Provincial Elections

Meeting place
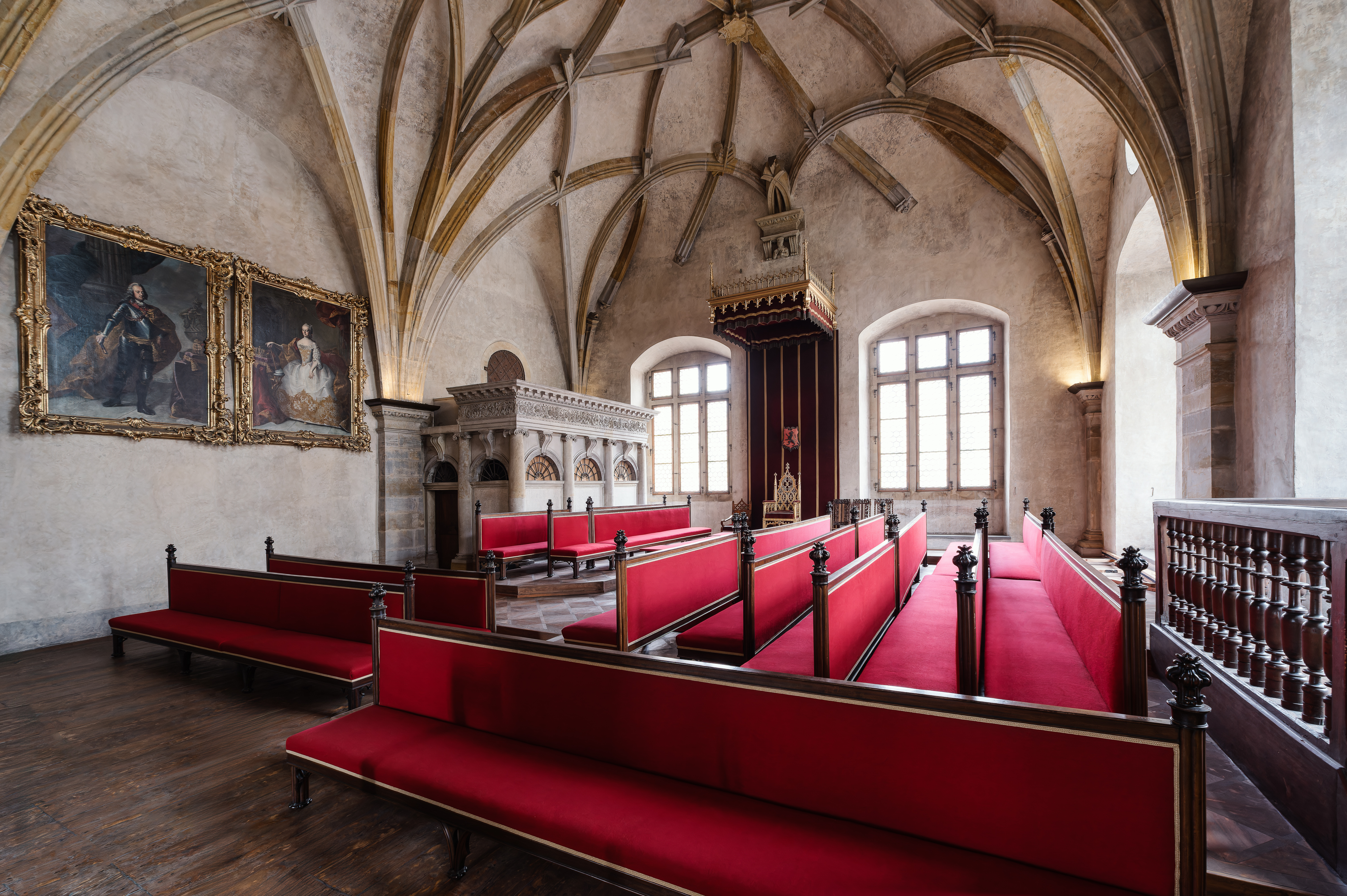
- Old House, Prague Castle

The Bohemian Diet (Czech: Český zemský sněm, German: Böhmischer Landtag) was the parliament of the Kingdom of Bohemia within the Austro-Hungarian Empire between 1861 and Czechoslovak independence in 1918.

== The Diet during the Absolutist Period ==
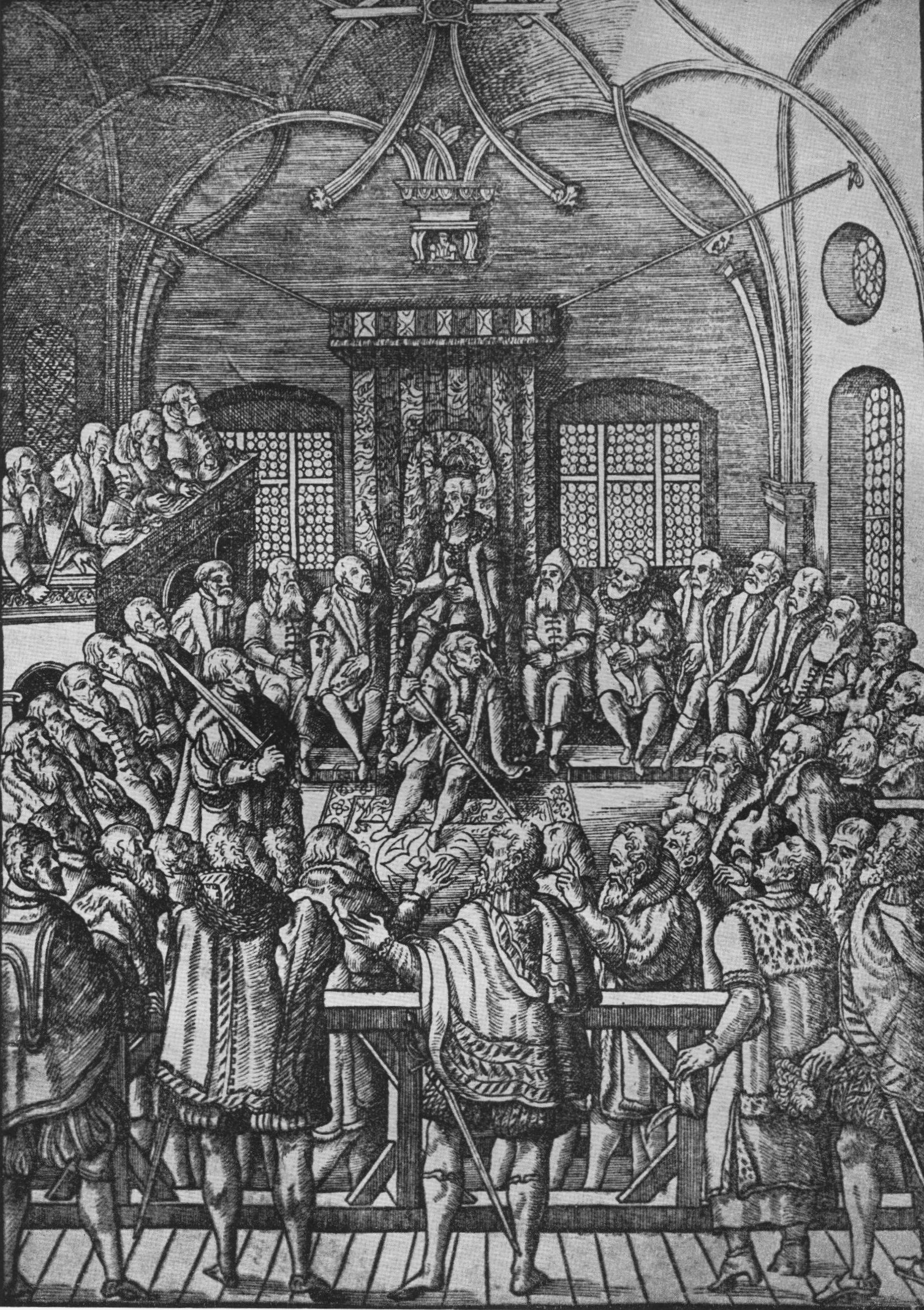
The Diet meeting in 1564 in the presence of Emperor Maximilian II

In 1471, the Bohemian estates elected the Jagiellon Vladislav II as their king. In 1500, the Land Assembly approved the Vladislav Land Establishment, named after the king, which gave the Bohemian noblemen an extensive share in political co-decision and is also considered to be the oldest written Czech constitution.

The chairman of the assembly was called the Supreme Burgrave (Czech: Nejvyšší purkrabí, German: Oberstburggraf ). He led talks with eight jurors appointed by the assembly, two from each state.

After the defeat of the Bohemian estates in the Battle of White Mountain, Ferdinand II would proclaim in 1627 for Bohemia and 1628 for Moravia the Renewed Regional Code, in which the monopoly position of the states was abolished in favour of the provincial government. Despite these limitations, the Diet and its committees, like the Diets in Austria, remained an effective means of political co-decision. In their meetings, usually once a year, the estates could, through the amount of taxes, resist the lords of the land. All direct and indirect taxes, with the exception of the collection of customs duties, remained within the competence of the estates. The Diet was thus a relic of the estate power rather than an absolutist instrument and even by the 1830s, the diet was again a base for organizing the opposition and a place of political friction.

Only during the reign of Maria Theresa was the strong share of estates in power permanently limited.

The diet was, with the exception of 1784–88 under Joseph II, held without interruption until 1848. At the end of its existence in 1848, the diet had 214 members.

The diet met at Prague Castle until 1801. From 1801 he was based in the Thun Palace in Malá Strana, Prague. This conference location remained the same until 1913. Today the palace is the seat of the Chamber of Deputies of Czechia.

== See also ==
- Czech National Council
- National Assembly (Czechoslovakia)
