= Sarolta Steinberger =

Hungarian physician

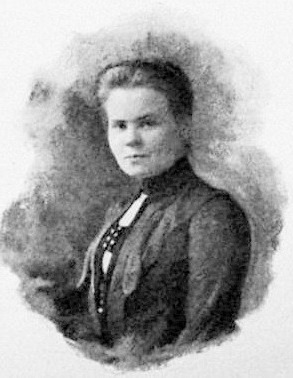
- Sarolta Steinberger
- Born: 12 September 1875; Tiszaújlak, Austria-Hungary (today Vylok, Ukraine)
- Died: 24 November 1965 (aged 90); Budapest, Hungary
- Other names: Charlotte Steinberger
- Education: Eötvös Loránd University
- Occupation: Doctor
- Known for: first woman doctor to qualify in Hungary

Sarolta Steinberger (12 September 1875 – 24 November 1965) was one of the first women to qualify as a physician in Hungary.

== Life ==
Steinberger was born in Tiszaújlak, Austria-Hungary (today Vylok, Ukraine) in 1875 to affluent Jewish parents. She attended private schools, and later she was educated in Kolozsvár (today Cluj-Napoca, Romania).

In December 1895, the newly appointed Minister of Education and Religion, Gyula Wlassics passed a law that allowed women, and Steinberger, to attend Eötvös Loránd University in Budapest to study medicine. In 1900, the Sunday News reported that Steinberger had qualified as a doctor. She was the first woman to achieve this qualification in Hungary. Vilma Hugonnai, who was a Hungarian countess, had qualified as a doctor in Zürich around 1879. but was only allowed to practise as a physician in Hungary in 1897.

After she qualified as a doctor, she first studied gynecology abroad for two years. When she returned to practise in Hungary she joined the Feminist Guild. Steinberger lectured and in 1902 she wrote a series of articles on The History of Doctors.

She worked at the Tauffer clinic which had been founded by William Tauffer in 1888. In 1913, the law was changed so that women doctors no longer needed a male doctor to work with them. In 1928, she became the director of the National Social Insurance Institute.

== World War II ==
Steinberger may have been able to leave Hungary in 1938 after the Nazis annexed the country. Her case was championed in the USA with leading suffragist Carrie Chapman Catt. World Peace Prize winner Rosika Schwimmer approached Catt to sign a letter in support of Eugénia Meller and Sarolta to emigrate to the USA. Catt refused to sign the letter. She noted that she was old and the letter would remain after her death.

Steinberger was the director of the National Social Insurance Institute until 1944 when the laws against Jews working prevented her from continuing her profession.

Steinberger retired and died in Pesthidegkút near Budapest in 1965.
