= Vilma Hugonnai =

Countess Vilma Hugonnai de Szentgyörgy
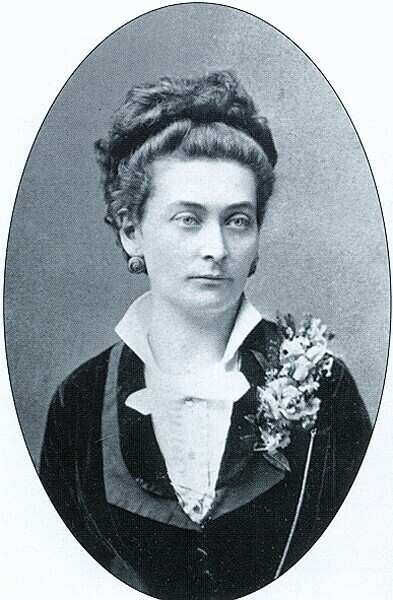
- Hugonnai, c. 1890
- Born: Vilma Hugonnai de Szentgyörgy; 30 September 1847; Nagytétény, Kingdom of Hungary, Austrian Empire
- Died: 25 March 1922 (aged 74); Budapest, Hungary
- Education: University of Zürich (M.D.)
- Occupation: Medical doctor

Countess Vilma Hugonnai de Szentgyörgy (30 September 1847 in Nagytétény, Hungary (today part of Budapest) – 25 March 1922 in Budapest) was the first Hungarian woman medical doctor.

== Life ==
Countess Vilma Hugonnai was the fifth child of Count Kálmán Hugonnai and Riza Pánczély. She studied Medicine in Zürich and received her degree in 1879. When Vilma returned to Hungary she could not begin her career as a physician as the Hungarian administration refused to recognize her qualifications because of her gender. She worked as a midwife until 1897, when the Hungarian authorities accepted her degree and she could start her own medical practice. The first woman to qualify in Hungary was Sarolta Steinberger in 1900. Neither of them was allowed to practice without a male doctor's supervision until 1913.

== Honors ==
Asteroid 287693 Hugonnaivilma, discovered by Hungarian astronomers Krisztián Sárneczky and Brigitta Sipőcz at Piszkéstető Station in 2003, was named in her memory. The official naming citation was published by the Minor Planet Center on 29 August 2015 (M.P.C. 95312).
