= Meanings of minor-planet names: 287001–288000 =

As minor planet discoveries are confirmed, they are given a permanent number by the IAU's Minor Planet Center (MPC), and the discoverers can then submit names for them, following the IAU's naming conventions. The list below concerns those minor planets in the specified number-range that have received names, and explains the meanings of those names.

Official naming citations of newly named small Solar System bodies are approved and published in a bulletin by IAU's Working Group for Small Bodies Nomenclature (WGSBN). Before May 2021, citations were published in MPC's Minor Planet Circulars for many decades. Recent citations can also be found on the JPL Small-Body Database (SBDB). Until his death in 2016, German astronomer Lutz D. Schmadel compiled these citations into the Dictionary of Minor Planet Names (DMP) and regularly updated the collection.

Based on Paul Herget's The Names of the Minor Planets, Schmadel also researched the unclear origin of numerous asteroids, most of which had been named prior to World War II. This article incorporates text from this source, which is in the public domain: SBDB New namings may only be added to this list below after official publication as the preannouncement of names is condemned. The WGSBN publishes a comprehensive guideline for the naming rules of non-cometary small Solar System bodies.

== 287001–287100 ==
Named minor planet	Provisional	This minor planet was named for...	Ref · Catalog
There are no named minor planets in this number range

== 287101–287200 ==
back to top

Named minor planet	Provisional	This minor planet was named for...	Ref · Catalog
There are no named minor planets in this number range

== 287201–287300 ==
back to top

Named minor planet	Provisional	This minor planet was named for...	Ref · Catalog
There are no named minor planets in this number range

== 287301–287400 ==
back to top

Named minor planet	Provisional	This minor planet was named for...	Ref · Catalog
287347 Mézes	2002 TM_{382}	Tibor Mézes (born 1942), a Slovak amateur astronomer and popularizer of astronomy	JPL · 287347
287374 Vreeland	2002 VR	Michael James Vreeland (1838–1876) was a Civil War Union Brevet Brigadier General, seriously wounded in the Battle of Gettysburg, who would later die from his injuries. He was a great-grandfather of the discoverer.	IAU · 287374

== 287401–287500 ==
back to top

Named minor planet	Provisional	This minor planet was named for...	Ref · Catalog
287432 Bril	2002 WP_{28}	Henk Bril (b. 1962), a Dutch amateur astronomer.	IAU · 287432
287433 de Groot	2002 WQ_{28}	Henk de Groot (b. 1954), a Dutch amateur astronomer.	IAU · 287433

== 287501–287600 ==
back to top

Named minor planet	Provisional	This minor planet was named for...	Ref · Catalog
There are no named minor planets in this number range

== 287601–287700 ==
back to top

Named minor planet	Provisional	This minor planet was named for...	Ref · Catalog
287693 Hugonnaivilma	2003 QD_{31}	Vilma Hugonnai (1847–1922), the first Hungarian woman medical doctor, receiving her degree in 1879 in Zurich	JPL · 287693

== 287701–287800 ==
back to top

Named minor planet	Provisional	This minor planet was named for...	Ref · Catalog
287711 Filotáslili	2003 QO_{69}	Lili Filotás (1908–1988), a Hungarian radio announcer, publisher and editor of Hungria Magazin.	IAU · 287711
287787 Karády	2003 SY_{128}	Katalin Karády (1910–1990), a Hungarian actress awarded the Righteous among the Nations for rescuing Hungarian Jews	JPL · 287787

== 287801–287900 ==
back to top

Named minor planet	Provisional	This minor planet was named for...	Ref · Catalog
287829 Juancarlos	2003 SB_{201}	Juan Carlos Atienza Ballano (1961–2017) was a Catholic priest for 33 years. He held the positions of Episcopal Vicar, Rector of the Seminary and Dean of the El Burgo de Osma Cathedral, amongst others. He worked to conserve the religious artistic heritage of Soria province.	IAU · 287829
287875 Pavlokorsun	2003 SV_{313}	Pavlo Korsun (1957–2022), a Ukrainian astrophysicist.	IAU · 287875

== 287901–288000 ==
back to top

Named minor planet	Provisional	This minor planet was named for...	Ref · Catalog
There are no named minor planets in this number range

back to top

Preceded by 286,001–287,000	Meanings of minor-planet names List of minor planets: 287,001–288,000	Succeeded by 288,001–289,000
