= List of minor planets: 287001–288000 =

The following is a partial list of minor planets, running from minor-planet number 287001 through 288000, inclusive. The primary data for this and other partial lists is based on JPL's "Small-Body Orbital Elements" and data available from the Minor Planet Center. Critical list information is also provided by the MPC, unless otherwise specified from Lowell Observatory. A detailed description of the table's columns and additional sources are given on the main page including a complete list of every page in this series, and a statistical break-up on the dynamical classification of minor planets.

Also see the summary list of all named bodies in numerical and alphabetical order, and the corresponding naming citations for the number range of this particular list. New namings may only be added to this list after official publication, as the preannouncement of names is condemned by the Working Group for Small Bodies Nomenclature of the International Astronomical Union.

Near-Earth obj.	MBA (inner)	MBA (outer)	Centaur
Mars-crosser	MBA (middle)	Jupiter trojan	Trans-Neptunian obj.
Unclassified

== 287001–287100 ==
Designation			Discovery			Properties		Ref
Permanent	Provisional	Named after	Date	Site	Discoverer(s)	Category	Diam.	Ref
287001	2002 QA_{66}	—	August 18, 2002	Palomar	NEAT	·	880 m	MPC · JPL
287002	2002 QK_{66}	—	August 18, 2002	Palomar	NEAT	KOR	1.5 km	MPC · JPL
287003	2002 QY_{66}	—	August 30, 2002	Palomar	NEAT	·	2.0 km	MPC · JPL
287004	2002 QP_{68}	—	August 27, 2002	Palomar	NEAT	·	2.1 km	MPC · JPL
287005	2002 QJ_{69}	—	August 28, 2002	Palomar	NEAT	·	3.1 km	MPC · JPL
287006	2002 QD_{72}	—	August 18, 2002	Palomar	NEAT	·	2.1 km	MPC · JPL
287007	2002 QN_{72}	—	August 30, 2002	Palomar	NEAT	EOS	3.8 km	MPC · JPL
287008	2002 QD_{75}	—	August 29, 2002	Palomar	NEAT	·	3.0 km	MPC · JPL
287009	2002 QV_{75}	—	August 30, 2002	Palomar	NEAT	·	2.0 km	MPC · JPL
287010	2002 QQ_{76}	—	August 18, 2002	Palomar	NEAT	·	1.2 km	MPC · JPL
287011	2002 QH_{80}	—	August 17, 2002	Palomar	NEAT	·	1.7 km	MPC · JPL
287012	2002 QF_{81}	—	August 27, 2002	Palomar	NEAT	·	1.9 km	MPC · JPL
287013	2002 QQ_{82}	—	August 16, 2002	Palomar	NEAT	·	3.0 km	MPC · JPL
287014	2002 QU_{82}	—	August 16, 2002	Palomar	NEAT	·	1.7 km	MPC · JPL
287015	2002 QJ_{83}	—	August 16, 2002	Palomar	NEAT	·	1.7 km	MPC · JPL
287016	2002 QK_{85}	—	August 17, 2002	Palomar	NEAT	·	1.9 km	MPC · JPL
287017	2002 QL_{85}	—	August 17, 2002	Palomar	NEAT	·	2.0 km	MPC · JPL
287018	2002 QV_{85}	—	August 17, 2002	Palomar	NEAT	·	3.3 km	MPC · JPL
287019	2002 QZ_{86}	—	August 30, 2002	Palomar	NEAT	·	1.3 km	MPC · JPL
287020	2002 QH_{87}	—	August 29, 2002	Palomar	NEAT	·	3.0 km	MPC · JPL
287021	2002 QL_{87}	—	August 29, 2002	Palomar	NEAT	·	1.8 km	MPC · JPL
287022	2002 QR_{89}	—	August 27, 2002	Palomar	NEAT	KOR	1.3 km	MPC · JPL
287023	2002 QO_{91}	—	August 24, 2002	Palomar	NEAT	·	2.0 km	MPC · JPL
287024	2002 QP_{91}	—	August 17, 2002	Palomar	NEAT	EOS	2.0 km	MPC · JPL
287025	2002 QZ_{91}	—	August 21, 2002	Palomar	NEAT	·	910 m	MPC · JPL
287026	2002 QU_{92}	—	August 19, 2002	Palomar	NEAT	·	1.1 km	MPC · JPL
287027	2002 QF_{94}	—	August 25, 2002	Palomar	NEAT	·	6.7 km	MPC · JPL
287028	2002 QG_{96}	—	August 18, 2002	Palomar	NEAT	·	2.3 km	MPC · JPL
287029	2002 QT_{98}	—	August 30, 2002	Palomar	NEAT	·	2.5 km	MPC · JPL
287030	2002 QP_{102}	—	August 18, 2002	Palomar	NEAT	·	4.1 km	MPC · JPL
287031	2002 QT_{104}	—	August 26, 2002	Palomar	NEAT	·	2.4 km	MPC · JPL
287032	2002 QH_{107}	—	August 27, 2002	Palomar	NEAT	·	880 m	MPC · JPL
287033	2002 QA_{108}	—	August 17, 2002	Palomar	NEAT	·	2.4 km	MPC · JPL
287034	2002 QS_{108}	—	August 16, 2002	Palomar	NEAT	·	2.2 km	MPC · JPL
287035	2002 QQ_{109}	—	August 17, 2002	Palomar	NEAT	·	2.6 km	MPC · JPL
287036	2002 QU_{110}	—	August 17, 2002	Palomar	NEAT	·	1.6 km	MPC · JPL
287037	2002 QU_{112}	—	August 27, 2002	Palomar	NEAT	·	1.1 km	MPC · JPL
287038	2002 QT_{113}	—	August 27, 2002	Palomar	NEAT	EOS	2.2 km	MPC · JPL
287039	2002 QQ_{115}	—	August 18, 2002	Palomar	NEAT	(12739)	2.0 km	MPC · JPL
287040	2002 QS_{115}	—	August 18, 2002	Palomar	NEAT	·	1.7 km	MPC · JPL
287041	2002 QX_{115}	—	August 29, 2002	Palomar	NEAT	·	2.5 km	MPC · JPL
287042	2002 QZ_{115}	—	August 18, 2002	Palomar	NEAT	·	3.2 km	MPC · JPL
287043	2002 QA_{118}	—	August 18, 2002	Palomar	NEAT	·	2.3 km	MPC · JPL
287044	2002 QJ_{121}	—	August 17, 2002	Palomar	NEAT	LUT	6.0 km	MPC · JPL
287045	2002 QV_{122}	—	August 27, 2002	Palomar	NEAT	·	5.9 km	MPC · JPL
287046	2002 QC_{123}	—	August 16, 2002	Palomar	NEAT	EOS ·	4.5 km	MPC · JPL
287047	2002 QJ_{123}	—	August 18, 2002	Palomar	NEAT	CYB	5.3 km	MPC · JPL
287048	2002 QS_{125}	—	August 28, 2002	Palomar	NEAT	WIT	1.1 km	MPC · JPL
287049	2002 QX_{127}	—	August 29, 2002	Palomar	NEAT	·	2.0 km	MPC · JPL
287050	2002 QL_{128}	—	August 29, 2002	Palomar	NEAT	EUN	1.3 km	MPC · JPL
287051	2002 QS_{129}	—	August 28, 2002	Palomar	NEAT	·	2.0 km	MPC · JPL
287052	2002 QV_{130}	—	August 30, 2002	Palomar	NEAT	·	2.3 km	MPC · JPL
287053	2002 QT_{131}	—	August 30, 2002	Palomar	NEAT	·	1.6 km	MPC · JPL
287054	2002 QS_{133}	—	August 28, 2002	Palomar	NEAT	EMA	4.5 km	MPC · JPL
287055	2002 QR_{134}	—	August 30, 2002	Palomar	NEAT	·	2.5 km	MPC · JPL
287056	2002 QY_{134}	—	August 30, 2002	Palomar	NEAT	NEM	2.5 km	MPC · JPL
287057	2002 RG	—	September 1, 2002	Kvistaberg	Uppsala-DLR Asteroid Survey	·	2.1 km	MPC · JPL
287058	2002 RH	—	September 1, 2002	Kvistaberg	Uppsala-DLR Asteroid Survey	·	2.2 km	MPC · JPL
287059	2002 RF_{1}	—	September 4, 2002	Emerald Lane	L. Ball	·	2.4 km	MPC · JPL
287060	2002 RB_{4}	—	September 3, 2002	Palomar	NEAT	·	1.4 km	MPC · JPL
287061	2002 RL_{4}	—	September 3, 2002	Palomar	NEAT	EUN	1.5 km	MPC · JPL
287062	2002 RC_{11}	—	September 4, 2002	Palomar	NEAT	·	2.5 km	MPC · JPL
287063	2002 RR_{11}	—	September 4, 2002	Anderson Mesa	LONEOS	·	1.8 km	MPC · JPL
287064	2002 RJ_{12}	—	September 4, 2002	Anderson Mesa	LONEOS	·	2.9 km	MPC · JPL
287065	2002 RU_{15}	—	September 4, 2002	Anderson Mesa	LONEOS	·	1.5 km	MPC · JPL
287066	2002 RP_{19}	—	September 4, 2002	Anderson Mesa	LONEOS	V	990 m	MPC · JPL
287067	2002 RG_{20}	—	September 4, 2002	Anderson Mesa	LONEOS	·	1.7 km	MPC · JPL
287068	2002 RO_{23}	—	September 4, 2002	Anderson Mesa	LONEOS	·	2.3 km	MPC · JPL
287069	2002 RH_{24}	—	September 4, 2002	Anderson Mesa	LONEOS	·	990 m	MPC · JPL
287070	2002 RW_{27}	—	September 4, 2002	Anderson Mesa	LONEOS	·	870 m	MPC · JPL
287071	2002 RZ_{28}	—	September 3, 2002	Palomar	NEAT	EUN	1.9 km	MPC · JPL
287072	2002 RN_{29}	—	September 3, 2002	Haleakala	NEAT	MRX	1.6 km	MPC · JPL
287073	2002 RA_{33}	—	September 4, 2002	Anderson Mesa	LONEOS	·	750 m	MPC · JPL
287074	2002 RC_{34}	—	September 4, 2002	Anderson Mesa	LONEOS	·	1.1 km	MPC · JPL
287075	2002 RH_{36}	—	September 5, 2002	Anderson Mesa	LONEOS	PHO	2.5 km	MPC · JPL
287076	2002 RX_{37}	—	September 5, 2002	Anderson Mesa	LONEOS	AEO	1.2 km	MPC · JPL
287077	2002 RV_{38}	—	September 5, 2002	Anderson Mesa	LONEOS	·	3.0 km	MPC · JPL
287078	2002 RX_{38}	—	September 5, 2002	Anderson Mesa	LONEOS	·	2.7 km	MPC · JPL
287079	2002 RE_{39}	—	September 5, 2002	Anderson Mesa	LONEOS	·	1.7 km	MPC · JPL
287080	2002 RF_{48}	—	September 5, 2002	Socorro	LINEAR	NYS	1.4 km	MPC · JPL
287081	2002 RG_{51}	—	September 5, 2002	Socorro	LINEAR	·	5.4 km	MPC · JPL
287082	2002 RS_{56}	—	September 5, 2002	Anderson Mesa	LONEOS	·	4.0 km	MPC · JPL
287083	2002 RH_{57}	—	September 5, 2002	Anderson Mesa	LONEOS	·	1.9 km	MPC · JPL
287084	2002 RW_{57}	—	September 5, 2002	Anderson Mesa	LONEOS	(5)	1.3 km	MPC · JPL
287085	2002 RN_{69}	—	September 4, 2002	Anderson Mesa	LONEOS	·	1.5 km	MPC · JPL
287086	2002 RO_{69}	—	September 4, 2002	Anderson Mesa	LONEOS	NYS	1.4 km	MPC · JPL
287087	2002 RQ_{71}	—	September 5, 2002	Socorro	LINEAR	·	2.2 km	MPC · JPL
287088	2002 RJ_{73}	—	September 5, 2002	Socorro	LINEAR	(5)	1.5 km	MPC · JPL
287089	2002 RB_{76}	—	September 5, 2002	Socorro	LINEAR	·	2.8 km	MPC · JPL
287090	2002 RF_{77}	—	September 5, 2002	Socorro	LINEAR	·	850 m	MPC · JPL
287091	2002 RG_{82}	—	September 5, 2002	Socorro	LINEAR	NEM	3.2 km	MPC · JPL
287092	2002 RN_{85}	—	September 5, 2002	Socorro	LINEAR	·	3.5 km	MPC · JPL
287093	2002 RG_{87}	—	September 5, 2002	Socorro	LINEAR	·	2.3 km	MPC · JPL
287094	2002 RZ_{97}	—	September 5, 2002	Socorro	LINEAR	·	1.8 km	MPC · JPL
287095	2002 RF_{109}	—	September 6, 2002	Socorro	LINEAR	·	2.0 km	MPC · JPL
287096	2002 RT_{110}	—	September 6, 2002	Socorro	LINEAR	·	1.5 km	MPC · JPL
287097	2002 RE_{113}	—	September 5, 2002	Anderson Mesa	LONEOS	·	1 km	MPC · JPL
287098	2002 RW_{125}	—	September 9, 2002	Palomar	NEAT	JUN	1.3 km	MPC · JPL
287099	2002 RK_{127}	—	September 10, 2002	Palomar	NEAT	·	2.6 km	MPC · JPL
287100	2002 RN_{135}	—	September 10, 2002	Haleakala	NEAT	·	1.6 km	MPC · JPL

== 287101–287200 ==
back to top

Designation			Discovery			Properties		Ref
Permanent	Provisional	Named after	Date	Site	Discoverer(s)	Category	Diam.	Ref
287101	2002 RL_{141}	—	September 10, 2002	Haleakala	NEAT	·	2.4 km	MPC · JPL
287102	2002 RC_{144}	—	September 11, 2002	Palomar	NEAT	·	1.3 km	MPC · JPL
287103	2002 RA_{147}	—	September 11, 2002	Palomar	NEAT	MAS	650 m	MPC · JPL
287104	2002 RD_{150}	—	September 11, 2002	Haleakala	NEAT	·	2.5 km	MPC · JPL
287105	2002 RF_{150}	—	September 11, 2002	Haleakala	NEAT	·	2.4 km	MPC · JPL
287106	2002 RV_{150}	—	September 12, 2002	Palomar	NEAT	H	640 m	MPC · JPL
287107	2002 RX_{152}	—	September 12, 2002	Palomar	NEAT	·	3.1 km	MPC · JPL
287108	2002 RZ_{153}	—	September 13, 2002	Kitt Peak	Spacewatch	·	980 m	MPC · JPL
287109	2002 RE_{155}	—	September 11, 2002	Palomar	NEAT	EOS	2.3 km	MPC · JPL
287110	2002 RC_{160}	—	September 12, 2002	Palomar	NEAT	NYS	1.4 km	MPC · JPL
287111	2002 RJ_{160}	—	September 12, 2002	Palomar	NEAT	EUP	4.6 km	MPC · JPL
287112	2002 RG_{161}	—	September 12, 2002	Palomar	NEAT	V	990 m	MPC · JPL
287113	2002 RE_{162}	—	September 12, 2002	Palomar	NEAT	·	2.3 km	MPC · JPL
287114	2002 RT_{163}	—	September 12, 2002	Palomar	NEAT	·	2.4 km	MPC · JPL
287115	2002 RK_{165}	—	September 13, 2002	Palomar	NEAT	·	1.9 km	MPC · JPL
287116	2002 RS_{165}	—	September 13, 2002	Palomar	NEAT	·	1.7 km	MPC · JPL
287117	2002 RG_{166}	—	September 13, 2002	Palomar	NEAT	·	930 m	MPC · JPL
287118	2002 RJ_{176}	—	September 13, 2002	Palomar	NEAT	·	1.8 km	MPC · JPL
287119	2002 RD_{177}	—	September 13, 2002	Palomar	NEAT	·	2.1 km	MPC · JPL
287120	2002 RW_{177}	—	September 13, 2002	Palomar	NEAT	·	2.4 km	MPC · JPL
287121	2002 RM_{180}	—	September 14, 2002	Palomar	NEAT	(29841)	1.9 km	MPC · JPL
287122	2002 RU_{181}	—	September 13, 2002	Goodricke-Pigott	R. A. Tucker	H	680 m	MPC · JPL
287123	2002 RR_{182}	—	September 11, 2002	Palomar	NEAT	KRM	3.0 km	MPC · JPL
287124	2002 RO_{183}	—	September 11, 2002	Palomar	NEAT	·	3.9 km	MPC · JPL
287125	2002 RT_{183}	—	September 11, 2002	Palomar	NEAT	·	1.9 km	MPC · JPL
287126	2002 RU_{184}	—	September 12, 2002	Palomar	NEAT	·	1.4 km	MPC · JPL
287127	2002 RZ_{184}	—	September 12, 2002	Palomar	NEAT	·	2.9 km	MPC · JPL
287128	2002 RV_{185}	—	September 12, 2002	Palomar	NEAT	·	2.7 km	MPC · JPL
287129	2002 RW_{187}	—	September 12, 2002	Palomar	NEAT	·	2.7 km	MPC · JPL
287130	2002 RK_{188}	—	September 13, 2002	Palomar	NEAT	·	1.4 km	MPC · JPL
287131	2002 RD_{191}	—	September 15, 2002	Palomar	NEAT	EUN	1.4 km	MPC · JPL
287132	2002 RZ_{192}	—	September 12, 2002	Palomar	NEAT	·	1.4 km	MPC · JPL
287133	2002 RC_{193}	—	September 12, 2002	Palomar	NEAT	·	1.9 km	MPC · JPL
287134	2002 RF_{196}	—	September 12, 2002	Palomar	NEAT	·	1.9 km	MPC · JPL
287135	2002 RG_{198}	—	September 13, 2002	Palomar	NEAT	·	1.1 km	MPC · JPL
287136	2002 RP_{201}	—	September 13, 2002	Socorro	LINEAR	MAS	900 m	MPC · JPL
287137	2002 RV_{201}	—	September 13, 2002	Socorro	LINEAR	·	1.5 km	MPC · JPL
287138	2002 RH_{203}	—	September 13, 2002	Palomar	NEAT	·	3.3 km	MPC · JPL
287139	2002 RJ_{207}	—	September 14, 2002	Palomar	NEAT	·	1.1 km	MPC · JPL
287140	2002 RZ_{207}	—	September 14, 2002	Haleakala	NEAT	·	1.6 km	MPC · JPL
287141	2002 RS_{208}	—	September 13, 2002	Kitt Peak	Spacewatch	·	2.4 km	MPC · JPL
287142	2002 RY_{213}	—	September 13, 2002	Socorro	LINEAR	(5)	1.3 km	MPC · JPL
287143	2002 RS_{214}	—	September 13, 2002	Socorro	LINEAR	EUN	1.3 km	MPC · JPL
287144	2002 RL_{220}	—	September 15, 2002	Palomar	NEAT	·	1.9 km	MPC · JPL
287145	2002 RM_{220}	—	September 15, 2002	Palomar	NEAT	·	1.3 km	MPC · JPL
287146	2002 RA_{226}	—	September 13, 2002	Palomar	NEAT	·	1.4 km	MPC · JPL
287147	2002 RK_{226}	—	September 14, 2002	Palomar	NEAT	·	1.3 km	MPC · JPL
287148	2002 RS_{226}	—	September 14, 2002	Palomar	NEAT	·	2.4 km	MPC · JPL
287149	2002 RM_{228}	—	September 14, 2002	Haleakala	NEAT	·	1.9 km	MPC · JPL
287150	2002 RV_{228}	—	September 14, 2002	Haleakala	NEAT	·	1.8 km	MPC · JPL
287151	2002 RN_{231}	—	September 14, 2002	Palomar	NEAT	·	1.6 km	MPC · JPL
287152	2002 RU_{231}	—	September 14, 2002	Palomar	NEAT	·	2.1 km	MPC · JPL
287153	2002 RF_{233}	—	September 14, 2002	Palomar	R. Matson	·	3.4 km	MPC · JPL
287154	2002 RN_{233}	—	September 14, 2002	Palomar	R. Matson	·	1.4 km	MPC · JPL
287155	2002 RB_{234}	—	September 14, 2002	Palomar	R. Matson	·	1.6 km	MPC · JPL
287156	2002 RQ_{234}	—	September 14, 2002	Palomar	R. Matson	EOS	2.0 km	MPC · JPL
287157	2002 RD_{235}	—	September 11, 2002	Palomar	White, M., M. Collins	·	1.7 km	MPC · JPL
287158	2002 RN_{235}	—	September 14, 2002	Palomar	R. Matson	·	2.8 km	MPC · JPL
287159	2002 RP_{235}	—	September 14, 2002	Palomar	R. Matson	MAS	860 m	MPC · JPL
287160	2002 RD_{238}	—	September 9, 2002	Haleakala	R. Matson	·	2.4 km	MPC · JPL
287161	2002 RE_{240}	—	September 11, 2002	Haleakala	S. F. Hönig	·	1.4 km	MPC · JPL
287162	2002 RL_{240}	—	September 11, 2002	Haleakala	S. F. Hönig	·	2.9 km	MPC · JPL
287163	2002 RQ_{244}	—	September 14, 2002	Palomar	NEAT	ADE	2.4 km	MPC · JPL
287164	2002 RW_{246}	—	September 14, 2002	Palomar	NEAT	V	780 m	MPC · JPL
287165	2002 RF_{247}	—	September 15, 2002	Palomar	NEAT	·	1.1 km	MPC · JPL
287166	2002 RR_{248}	—	September 14, 2002	Palomar	NEAT	·	760 m	MPC · JPL
287167	2002 RJ_{251}	—	September 4, 2002	Palomar	NEAT	·	1.8 km	MPC · JPL
287168	2002 RR_{251}	—	September 3, 2002	Palomar	NEAT	·	2.3 km	MPC · JPL
287169	2002 RK_{253}	—	September 14, 2002	Palomar	NEAT	WIT	1.2 km	MPC · JPL
287170	2002 RV_{253}	—	September 12, 2002	Palomar	NEAT	·	1.6 km	MPC · JPL
287171	2002 RD_{254}	—	September 14, 2002	Palomar	NEAT	·	2.0 km	MPC · JPL
287172	2002 RM_{254}	—	September 14, 2002	Palomar	NEAT	·	3.0 km	MPC · JPL
287173	2002 RZ_{254}	—	September 14, 2002	Palomar	NEAT	·	1.3 km	MPC · JPL
287174	2002 RC_{259}	—	September 14, 2002	Palomar	NEAT	·	3.7 km	MPC · JPL
287175	2002 RR_{261}	—	September 13, 2002	Palomar	Palomar	·	2.1 km	MPC · JPL
287176	2002 RK_{263}	—	September 13, 2002	Palomar	NEAT	·	1.9 km	MPC · JPL
287177	2002 RW_{266}	—	September 13, 2002	Palomar	NEAT	·	2.7 km	MPC · JPL
287178	2002 RQ_{267}	—	September 3, 2002	Palomar	NEAT	·	3.8 km	MPC · JPL
287179	2002 RV_{267}	—	September 13, 2002	Palomar	NEAT	GEF	1.5 km	MPC · JPL
287180	2002 RF_{269}	—	September 4, 2002	Palomar	NEAT	·	1.3 km	MPC · JPL
287181	2002 RT_{270}	—	September 4, 2002	Palomar	NEAT	·	1.5 km	MPC · JPL
287182	2002 RY_{271}	—	September 4, 2002	Palomar	NEAT	·	2.6 km	MPC · JPL
287183	2002 RE_{272}	—	September 4, 2002	Palomar	NEAT	·	2.4 km	MPC · JPL
287184	2002 RW_{272}	—	September 4, 2002	Palomar	NEAT	·	2.3 km	MPC · JPL
287185	2002 RB_{273}	—	September 4, 2002	Palomar	NEAT	·	1.2 km	MPC · JPL
287186	2002 RW_{282}	—	September 14, 2002	Palomar	NEAT	AGN	1.3 km	MPC · JPL
287187	2002 RA_{291}	—	January 19, 2009	Mount Lemmon	Mount Lemmon Survey	ADE	4.1 km	MPC · JPL
287188	2002 SE	—	September 16, 2002	Palomar	NEAT	·	3.4 km	MPC · JPL
287189	2002 SX_{3}	—	September 26, 2002	Palomar	NEAT	NYS	940 m	MPC · JPL
287190	2002 SL_{4}	—	September 27, 2002	Palomar	NEAT	H	630 m	MPC · JPL
287191	2002 SD_{5}	—	September 27, 2002	Palomar	NEAT	·	2.3 km	MPC · JPL
287192	2002 SP_{11}	—	September 27, 2002	Palomar	NEAT	·	2.8 km	MPC · JPL
287193	2002 SF_{15}	—	September 27, 2002	Palomar	NEAT	·	4.7 km	MPC · JPL
287194	2002 SA_{17}	—	September 28, 2002	Palomar	NEAT	(5)	1.5 km	MPC · JPL
287195	2002 SW_{19}	—	September 26, 2002	Socorro	LINEAR	·	3.1 km	MPC · JPL
287196	2002 SE_{22}	—	September 26, 2002	Palomar	NEAT	·	3.0 km	MPC · JPL
287197	2002 SK_{23}	—	September 27, 2002	Palomar	NEAT	(5)	2.0 km	MPC · JPL
287198	2002 SM_{23}	—	September 27, 2002	Palomar	NEAT	NYS	1.2 km	MPC · JPL
287199	2002 SR_{23}	—	September 27, 2002	Palomar	NEAT	·	1.3 km	MPC · JPL
287200	2002 SF_{24}	—	September 27, 2002	Palomar	NEAT	·	1.5 km	MPC · JPL

== 287201–287300 ==
back to top

Designation			Discovery			Properties		Ref
Permanent	Provisional	Named after	Date	Site	Discoverer(s)	Category	Diam.	Ref
287201	2002 SW_{27}	—	September 26, 2002	Palomar	NEAT	TIR	3.6 km	MPC · JPL
287202	2002 SY_{31}	—	September 28, 2002	Haleakala	NEAT	·	2.2 km	MPC · JPL
287203	2002 SW_{32}	—	September 28, 2002	Haleakala	NEAT	DOR	3.4 km	MPC · JPL
287204	2002 SW_{34}	—	September 29, 2002	Haleakala	NEAT	·	2.2 km	MPC · JPL
287205	2002 SP_{43}	—	September 28, 2002	Haleakala	NEAT	·	1.5 km	MPC · JPL
287206	2002 SK_{44}	—	September 29, 2002	Haleakala	NEAT	·	1.6 km	MPC · JPL
287207	2002 ST_{44}	—	September 29, 2002	Haleakala	NEAT	3:2	6.5 km	MPC · JPL
287208	2002 SQ_{53}	—	September 20, 2002	Palomar	NEAT	·	1.1 km	MPC · JPL
287209	2002 SQ_{54}	—	September 30, 2002	Socorro	LINEAR	·	3.6 km	MPC · JPL
287210	2002 SK_{65}	—	September 17, 2002	Palomar	NEAT	·	1.8 km	MPC · JPL
287211	2002 SY_{65}	—	September 16, 2002	Palomar	NEAT	·	1.5 km	MPC · JPL
287212	2002 SS_{67}	—	September 26, 2002	Palomar	NEAT	·	1.8 km	MPC · JPL
287213	2002 SN_{68}	—	September 26, 2002	Palomar	NEAT	·	1.8 km	MPC · JPL
287214	2002 SL_{70}	—	September 26, 2002	Palomar	NEAT	HOF	3.0 km	MPC · JPL
287215	2002 SU_{70}	—	September 16, 2002	Palomar	NEAT	AGN	1.1 km	MPC · JPL
287216	2002 SW_{70}	—	September 16, 2002	Palomar	NEAT	·	3.2 km	MPC · JPL
287217	2002 SO_{71}	—	February 16, 2004	Kitt Peak	Spacewatch	·	1.4 km	MPC · JPL
287218	2002 SB_{72}	—	September 26, 2002	Palomar	NEAT	·	1.6 km	MPC · JPL
287219	2002 SX_{72}	—	September 16, 2002	Palomar	NEAT	NYS	1.3 km	MPC · JPL
287220	2002 SY_{73}	—	September 16, 2002	Palomar	NEAT	·	5.2 km	MPC · JPL
287221	2002 TD_{4}	—	October 1, 2002	Anderson Mesa	LONEOS	·	1.6 km	MPC · JPL
287222	2002 TM_{4}	—	October 1, 2002	Socorro	LINEAR	·	2.4 km	MPC · JPL
287223	2002 TA_{11}	—	October 2, 2002	Campo Imperatore	CINEOS	·	2.1 km	MPC · JPL
287224	2002 TN_{11}	—	October 1, 2002	Anderson Mesa	LONEOS	·	1.9 km	MPC · JPL
287225	2002 TG_{12}	—	October 1, 2002	Anderson Mesa	LONEOS	·	1.4 km	MPC · JPL
287226	2002 TM_{13}	—	October 1, 2002	Anderson Mesa	LONEOS	AEO	1.5 km	MPC · JPL
287227	2002 TD_{16}	—	October 2, 2002	Socorro	LINEAR	·	1.1 km	MPC · JPL
287228	2002 TJ_{16}	—	October 2, 2002	Socorro	LINEAR	ADE ·	1.8 km	MPC · JPL
287229	2002 TE_{19}	—	October 2, 2002	Socorro	LINEAR	NYS	1.2 km	MPC · JPL
287230	2002 TA_{21}	—	October 2, 2002	Socorro	LINEAR	·	2.5 km	MPC · JPL
287231	2002 TT_{23}	—	October 2, 2002	Socorro	LINEAR	·	1.7 km	MPC · JPL
287232	2002 TG_{24}	—	October 2, 2002	Socorro	LINEAR	·	2.0 km	MPC · JPL
287233	2002 TJ_{30}	—	October 2, 2002	Socorro	LINEAR	(13314)	2.7 km	MPC · JPL
287234	2002 TR_{35}	—	October 2, 2002	Socorro	LINEAR	·	2.4 km	MPC · JPL
287235	2002 TA_{36}	—	October 2, 2002	Socorro	LINEAR	·	1.6 km	MPC · JPL
287236	2002 TB_{36}	—	October 2, 2002	Socorro	LINEAR	·	2.4 km	MPC · JPL
287237	2002 TN_{42}	—	October 2, 2002	Socorro	LINEAR	·	3.4 km	MPC · JPL
287238	2002 TJ_{44}	—	October 2, 2002	Haleakala	NEAT	·	800 m	MPC · JPL
287239	2002 TP_{49}	—	October 2, 2002	Socorro	LINEAR	GEF	1.6 km	MPC · JPL
287240	2002 TV_{51}	—	October 2, 2002	Socorro	LINEAR	·	3.9 km	MPC · JPL
287241	2002 TA_{56}	—	October 1, 2002	Anderson Mesa	LONEOS	·	1.4 km	MPC · JPL
287242	2002 TJ_{56}	—	October 2, 2002	Socorro	LINEAR	·	2.1 km	MPC · JPL
287243	2002 TM_{63}	—	October 3, 2002	Campo Imperatore	CINEOS	·	2.3 km	MPC · JPL
287244	2002 TN_{63}	—	October 3, 2002	Campo Imperatore	CINEOS	EUN	1.6 km	MPC · JPL
287245	2002 TQ_{63}	—	October 4, 2002	Campo Imperatore	CINEOS	·	1.6 km	MPC · JPL
287246	2002 TR_{63}	—	October 4, 2002	Campo Imperatore	CINEOS	·	1.0 km	MPC · JPL
287247	2002 TJ_{67}	—	October 4, 2002	Socorro	LINEAR	·	2.8 km	MPC · JPL
287248	2002 TW_{69}	—	October 9, 2002	Uccle	T. Pauwels	·	2.5 km	MPC · JPL
287249	2002 TJ_{90}	—	October 3, 2002	Palomar	NEAT	·	3.7 km	MPC · JPL
287250	2002 TX_{95}	—	October 3, 2002	Palomar	NEAT	·	2.6 km	MPC · JPL
287251	2002 TO_{96}	—	October 11, 2002	Palomar	NEAT	V	850 m	MPC · JPL
287252	2002 TC_{100}	—	October 4, 2002	Anderson Mesa	LONEOS	·	2.5 km	MPC · JPL
287253	2002 TS_{101}	—	October 4, 2002	Socorro	LINEAR	·	1.2 km	MPC · JPL
287254	2002 TT_{101}	—	October 4, 2002	Socorro	LINEAR	·	830 m	MPC · JPL
287255	2002 TH_{103}	—	October 4, 2002	Socorro	LINEAR	·	3.0 km	MPC · JPL
287256	2002 TM_{114}	—	October 3, 2002	Palomar	NEAT	GEF	1.8 km	MPC · JPL
287257	2002 TW_{120}	—	October 3, 2002	Palomar	NEAT	H	640 m	MPC · JPL
287258	2002 TN_{123}	—	October 4, 2002	Palomar	NEAT	DOR	3.3 km	MPC · JPL
287259	2002 TC_{127}	—	October 4, 2002	Palomar	NEAT	ADE	3.1 km	MPC · JPL
287260	2002 TF_{129}	—	October 4, 2002	Palomar	NEAT	·	2.6 km	MPC · JPL
287261	2002 TB_{130}	—	October 4, 2002	Palomar	NEAT	·	3.1 km	MPC · JPL
287262	2002 TM_{139}	—	October 4, 2002	Anderson Mesa	LONEOS	·	3.2 km	MPC · JPL
287263	2002 TA_{145}	—	October 2, 2002	Campo Imperatore	CINEOS	·	2.5 km	MPC · JPL
287264	2002 TB_{145}	—	October 2, 2002	Campo Imperatore	CINEOS	·	6.6 km	MPC · JPL
287265	2002 TA_{146}	—	October 4, 2002	Socorro	LINEAR	·	1.7 km	MPC · JPL
287266	2002 TF_{148}	—	October 5, 2002	Palomar	NEAT	·	3.2 km	MPC · JPL
287267	2002 TR_{148}	—	October 5, 2002	Palomar	NEAT	·	1.9 km	MPC · JPL
287268	2002 TY_{151}	—	October 5, 2002	Palomar	NEAT	·	1.3 km	MPC · JPL
287269	2002 TW_{155}	—	October 5, 2002	Kitt Peak	Spacewatch	·	5.0 km	MPC · JPL
287270	2002 TU_{156}	—	October 5, 2002	Palomar	NEAT	·	1.8 km	MPC · JPL
287271	2002 TY_{156}	—	October 5, 2002	Palomar	NEAT	EOS	2.8 km	MPC · JPL
287272	2002 TE_{159}	—	October 5, 2002	Palomar	NEAT	·	4.2 km	MPC · JPL
287273	2002 TO_{161}	—	October 5, 2002	Palomar	NEAT	JUN	1.2 km	MPC · JPL
287274	2002 TN_{163}	—	October 5, 2002	Palomar	NEAT	T_{j} (2.99)	4.8 km	MPC · JPL
287275	2002 TY_{166}	—	October 3, 2002	Palomar	NEAT	·	2.3 km	MPC · JPL
287276	2002 TG_{167}	—	October 3, 2002	Palomar	NEAT	·	3.1 km	MPC · JPL
287277	2002 TV_{167}	—	October 3, 2002	Palomar	NEAT	·	4.2 km	MPC · JPL
287278	2002 TZ_{168}	—	October 3, 2002	Palomar	NEAT	·	2.9 km	MPC · JPL
287279	2002 TT_{169}	—	October 3, 2002	Palomar	NEAT	·	1.7 km	MPC · JPL
287280	2002 TY_{171}	—	October 4, 2002	Palomar	NEAT	(18466)	3.7 km	MPC · JPL
287281	2002 TC_{173}	—	September 7, 2002	Socorro	LINEAR	DOR	2.8 km	MPC · JPL
287282	2002 TZ_{175}	—	October 4, 2002	Anderson Mesa	LONEOS	·	1.6 km	MPC · JPL
287283	2002 TH_{177}	—	October 5, 2002	Palomar	NEAT	·	3.6 km	MPC · JPL
287284	2002 TM_{181}	—	October 3, 2002	Socorro	LINEAR	3:2 · SHU	6.7 km	MPC · JPL
287285	2002 TE_{184}	—	October 4, 2002	Socorro	LINEAR	·	3.6 km	MPC · JPL
287286	2002 TQ_{186}	—	October 4, 2002	Socorro	LINEAR	·	1.0 km	MPC · JPL
287287	2002 TK_{192}	—	October 5, 2002	Anderson Mesa	LONEOS	·	3.0 km	MPC · JPL
287288	2002 TQ_{193}	—	October 3, 2002	Socorro	LINEAR	·	1.4 km	MPC · JPL
287289	2002 TJ_{194}	—	October 3, 2002	Socorro	LINEAR	·	2.5 km	MPC · JPL
287290	2002 TT_{194}	—	October 3, 2002	Socorro	LINEAR	AGN	1.4 km	MPC · JPL
287291	2002 TP_{196}	—	October 4, 2002	Kitt Peak	Spacewatch	·	2.4 km	MPC · JPL
287292	2002 TB_{197}	—	October 4, 2002	Socorro	LINEAR	T_{j} (2.99) · 3:2	6.2 km	MPC · JPL
287293	2002 TW_{197}	—	October 4, 2002	Socorro	LINEAR	·	2.7 km	MPC · JPL
287294	2002 TH_{200}	—	October 9, 2002	Bergisch Gladbach	W. Bickel	THM	2.5 km	MPC · JPL
287295	2002 TC_{204}	—	October 4, 2002	Socorro	LINEAR	·	1.4 km	MPC · JPL
287296	2002 TE_{204}	—	October 4, 2002	Socorro	LINEAR	·	1.3 km	MPC · JPL
287297	2002 TL_{204}	—	October 4, 2002	Socorro	LINEAR	·	2.6 km	MPC · JPL
287298	2002 TH_{205}	—	October 4, 2002	Socorro	LINEAR	·	870 m	MPC · JPL
287299	2002 TZ_{205}	—	October 4, 2002	Socorro	LINEAR	·	1.7 km	MPC · JPL
287300	2002 TD_{208}	—	October 4, 2002	Socorro	LINEAR	·	2.4 km	MPC · JPL

== 287301–287400 ==
back to top

Designation			Discovery			Properties		Ref
Permanent	Provisional	Named after	Date	Site	Discoverer(s)	Category	Diam.	Ref
287301	2002 TK_{209}	—	October 6, 2002	Socorro	LINEAR	·	2.8 km	MPC · JPL
287302	2002 TX_{214}	—	October 4, 2002	Socorro	LINEAR	·	1.1 km	MPC · JPL
287303	2002 TM_{215}	—	October 4, 2002	Socorro	LINEAR	·	3.0 km	MPC · JPL
287304	2002 TL_{217}	—	October 7, 2002	Socorro	LINEAR	·	680 m	MPC · JPL
287305	2002 TF_{218}	—	October 5, 2002	Socorro	LINEAR	·	2.1 km	MPC · JPL
287306	2002 TF_{229}	—	October 7, 2002	Haleakala	NEAT	·	1.6 km	MPC · JPL
287307	2002 TT_{231}	—	October 8, 2002	Palomar	NEAT	HNS	1.9 km	MPC · JPL
287308	2002 TA_{233}	—	October 6, 2002	Socorro	LINEAR	·	2.8 km	MPC · JPL
287309	2002 TJ_{239}	—	October 9, 2002	Socorro	LINEAR	·	2.6 km	MPC · JPL
287310	2002 TJ_{244}	—	October 10, 2002	Palomar	NEAT	·	3.2 km	MPC · JPL
287311	2002 TM_{250}	—	October 7, 2002	Socorro	LINEAR	·	1.8 km	MPC · JPL
287312	2002 TU_{250}	—	October 7, 2002	Socorro	LINEAR	·	1.9 km	MPC · JPL
287313	2002 TB_{252}	—	October 8, 2002	Anderson Mesa	LONEOS	·	1.7 km	MPC · JPL
287314	2002 TW_{253}	—	October 9, 2002	Socorro	LINEAR	·	1.2 km	MPC · JPL
287315	2002 TP_{257}	—	October 9, 2002	Socorro	LINEAR	NYS	1.2 km	MPC · JPL
287316	2002 TZ_{257}	—	October 9, 2002	Socorro	LINEAR	·	3.5 km	MPC · JPL
287317	2002 TM_{261}	—	October 9, 2002	Socorro	LINEAR	·	3.5 km	MPC · JPL
287318	2002 TZ_{262}	—	October 10, 2002	Palomar	NEAT	·	2.5 km	MPC · JPL
287319	2002 TL_{263}	—	October 10, 2002	Socorro	LINEAR	·	6.3 km	MPC · JPL
287320	2002 TN_{263}	—	October 10, 2002	Socorro	LINEAR	·	2.3 km	MPC · JPL
287321	2002 TZ_{267}	—	October 9, 2002	Socorro	LINEAR	·	1.2 km	MPC · JPL
287322	2002 TG_{268}	—	October 9, 2002	Socorro	LINEAR	·	1.1 km	MPC · JPL
287323	2002 TZ_{268}	—	October 9, 2002	Socorro	LINEAR	JUN	1.2 km	MPC · JPL
287324	2002 TC_{288}	—	October 10, 2002	Socorro	LINEAR	·	4.2 km	MPC · JPL
287325	2002 TJ_{297}	—	October 11, 2002	Socorro	LINEAR	MAS	830 m	MPC · JPL
287326	2002 TK_{298}	—	October 12, 2002	Socorro	LINEAR	·	2.5 km	MPC · JPL
287327	2002 TJ_{304}	—	October 4, 2002	Apache Point	SDSS	EOS	2.8 km	MPC · JPL
287328	2002 TK_{306}	—	October 4, 2002	Apache Point	SDSS	·	2.8 km	MPC · JPL
287329	2002 TX_{308}	—	October 4, 2002	Apache Point	SDSS	·	3.6 km	MPC · JPL
287330	2002 TY_{312}	—	October 4, 2002	Apache Point	SDSS	EUN	1.4 km	MPC · JPL
287331	2002 TV_{314}	—	October 4, 2002	Apache Point	SDSS	MAR	1.1 km	MPC · JPL
287332	2002 TZ_{314}	—	October 4, 2002	Apache Point	SDSS	·	2.1 km	MPC · JPL
287333	2002 TG_{315}	—	October 4, 2002	Apache Point	SDSS	·	2.7 km	MPC · JPL
287334	2002 TF_{316}	—	October 4, 2002	Apache Point	SDSS	·	4.5 km	MPC · JPL
287335	2002 TV_{316}	—	October 4, 2002	Apache Point	SDSS	·	2.6 km	MPC · JPL
287336	2002 TP_{329}	—	October 5, 2002	Apache Point	SDSS	·	1.0 km	MPC · JPL
287337	2002 TM_{332}	—	October 5, 2002	Apache Point	SDSS	·	2.2 km	MPC · JPL
287338	2002 TN_{332}	—	October 5, 2002	Apache Point	SDSS	·	1.0 km	MPC · JPL
287339	2002 TU_{334}	—	October 5, 2002	Apache Point	SDSS	·	5.1 km	MPC · JPL
287340	2002 TU_{343}	—	October 5, 2002	Apache Point	SDSS	·	2.2 km	MPC · JPL
287341	2002 TU_{348}	—	October 5, 2002	Apache Point	SDSS	·	2.9 km	MPC · JPL
287342	2002 TN_{350}	—	October 10, 2002	Apache Point	SDSS	·	3.5 km	MPC · JPL
287343	2002 TK_{353}	—	October 10, 2002	Apache Point	SDSS	·	1.9 km	MPC · JPL
287344	2002 TE_{354}	—	October 10, 2002	Apache Point	SDSS	·	1.9 km	MPC · JPL
287345	2002 TN_{363}	—	October 10, 2002	Apache Point	SDSS	KOR	1.4 km	MPC · JPL
287346	2002 TX_{371}	—	October 10, 2002	Apache Point	SDSS	·	3.6 km	MPC · JPL
287347 Mézes	2002 TM_{382}	Mézes	October 9, 2002	Palomar	NEAT	·	2.6 km	MPC · JPL
287348	2002 TE_{384}	—	October 15, 2002	Palomar	NEAT	·	690 m	MPC · JPL
287349	2002 TP_{384}	—	October 13, 2002	Kitt Peak	Spacewatch	·	1.8 km	MPC · JPL
287350	2002 TA_{387}	—	September 24, 1960	Palomar	C. J. van Houten, I. van Houten-Groeneveld, T. Gehrels	·	2.7 km	MPC · JPL
287351	2002 US_{1}	—	October 28, 2002	Nogales	C. W. Juels, P. R. Holvorcem	·	2.3 km	MPC · JPL
287352	2002 UG_{3}	—	October 28, 2002	Palomar	NEAT	·	3.1 km	MPC · JPL
287353	2002 UL_{7}	—	October 28, 2002	Palomar	NEAT	·	2.2 km	MPC · JPL
287354	2002 UT_{10}	—	October 29, 2002	Kitt Peak	Spacewatch	NYS	1.3 km	MPC · JPL
287355	2002 UU_{12}	—	October 28, 2002	Palomar	NEAT	·	3.3 km	MPC · JPL
287356	2002 UB_{13}	—	October 28, 2002	Haleakala	NEAT	·	4.0 km	MPC · JPL
287357	2002 UR_{18}	—	October 30, 2002	Palomar	NEAT	NYS	1.1 km	MPC · JPL
287358	2002 UA_{27}	—	October 31, 2002	Anderson Mesa	LONEOS	·	2.7 km	MPC · JPL
287359	2002 UB_{29}	—	October 31, 2002	Socorro	LINEAR	·	2.8 km	MPC · JPL
287360	2002 UO_{41}	—	October 31, 2002	Palomar	NEAT	·	2.4 km	MPC · JPL
287361	2002 UY_{48}	—	October 31, 2002	Socorro	LINEAR	DOR	3.4 km	MPC · JPL
287362	2002 UY_{51}	—	October 29, 2002	Apache Point	SDSS	·	2.9 km	MPC · JPL
287363	2002 UF_{53}	—	October 29, 2002	Apache Point	SDSS	·	930 m	MPC · JPL
287364	2002 UY_{57}	—	October 29, 2002	Apache Point	SDSS	·	1.6 km	MPC · JPL
287365	2002 UA_{62}	—	October 30, 2002	Apache Point	SDSS	·	2.3 km	MPC · JPL
287366	2002 UX_{63}	—	October 30, 2002	Apache Point	SDSS	·	1.4 km	MPC · JPL
287367	2002 UP_{65}	—	October 30, 2002	Apache Point	SDSS	·	1.9 km	MPC · JPL
287368	2002 UB_{66}	—	October 30, 2002	Apache Point	SDSS	KOR	1.3 km	MPC · JPL
287369	2002 UN_{72}	—	October 16, 2002	Palomar	NEAT	·	960 m	MPC · JPL
287370	2002 UQ_{72}	—	October 16, 2002	Palomar	NEAT	·	1.8 km	MPC · JPL
287371	2002 UC_{73}	—	October 16, 2002	Palomar	NEAT	AGN	1.5 km	MPC · JPL
287372	2002 UE_{77}	—	October 18, 2002	Palomar	NEAT	AGN	1.4 km	MPC · JPL
287373	2002 UG_{77}	—	October 18, 2002	Palomar	NEAT	V	870 m	MPC · JPL
287374 Vreeland	2002 VR	Vreeland	November 2, 2002	Wrightwood	J. W. Young	·	1.6 km	MPC · JPL
287375	2002 VL_{4}	—	November 4, 2002	Palomar	NEAT	·	1.1 km	MPC · JPL
287376	2002 VD_{6}	—	November 4, 2002	Haleakala	NEAT	·	1.8 km	MPC · JPL
287377	2002 VW_{12}	—	November 4, 2002	Palomar	NEAT	·	2.4 km	MPC · JPL
287378	2002 VQ_{13}	—	November 4, 2002	Kitt Peak	Spacewatch	H	830 m	MPC · JPL
287379	2002 VS_{13}	—	November 5, 2002	Socorro	LINEAR	·	770 m	MPC · JPL
287380	2002 VT_{14}	—	November 4, 2002	Palomar	NEAT	·	2.7 km	MPC · JPL
287381	2002 VG_{16}	—	November 4, 2002	Kitt Peak	Spacewatch	·	810 m	MPC · JPL
287382	2002 VJ_{16}	—	November 5, 2002	Socorro	LINEAR	·	940 m	MPC · JPL
287383	2002 VW_{20}	—	November 5, 2002	Socorro	LINEAR	·	1.8 km	MPC · JPL
287384	2002 VE_{21}	—	November 5, 2002	Socorro	LINEAR	V	940 m	MPC · JPL
287385	2002 VW_{21}	—	November 5, 2002	Socorro	LINEAR	T_{j} (2.97) · HIL · 3:2	7.4 km	MPC · JPL
287386	2002 VK_{35}	—	November 5, 2002	Kitt Peak	Spacewatch	·	3.2 km	MPC · JPL
287387	2002 VS_{40}	—	November 1, 2002	Palomar	NEAT	·	4.2 km	MPC · JPL
287388	2002 VY_{43}	—	November 4, 2002	Palomar	NEAT	·	4.1 km	MPC · JPL
287389	2002 VX_{53}	—	November 6, 2002	Socorro	LINEAR	·	690 m	MPC · JPL
287390	2002 VV_{62}	—	November 6, 2002	Socorro	LINEAR	·	5.2 km	MPC · JPL
287391	2002 VT_{64}	—	November 7, 2002	Anderson Mesa	LONEOS	·	5.4 km	MPC · JPL
287392	2002 VU_{70}	—	November 7, 2002	Socorro	LINEAR	·	2.9 km	MPC · JPL
287393	2002 VE_{72}	—	November 7, 2002	Socorro	LINEAR	·	2.8 km	MPC · JPL
287394	2002 VH_{73}	—	November 7, 2002	Socorro	LINEAR	·	3.3 km	MPC · JPL
287395	2002 VA_{77}	—	November 7, 2002	Socorro	LINEAR	·	1.0 km	MPC · JPL
287396	2002 VU_{85}	—	November 8, 2002	Socorro	LINEAR	·	1.1 km	MPC · JPL
287397	2002 VA_{91}	—	November 11, 2002	Kitt Peak	Spacewatch	·	2.3 km	MPC · JPL
287398	2002 VO_{92}	—	November 11, 2002	Socorro	LINEAR	DOR	3.3 km	MPC · JPL
287399	2002 VM_{93}	—	November 11, 2002	Essen	Essen	(2076)	1.1 km	MPC · JPL
287400	2002 VG_{95}	—	November 14, 2002	Socorro	LINEAR	·	1.1 km	MPC · JPL

== 287401–287500 ==
back to top

Designation			Discovery			Properties		Ref
Permanent	Provisional	Named after	Date	Site	Discoverer(s)	Category	Diam.	Ref
287401	2002 VA_{98}	—	November 12, 2002	Socorro	LINEAR	·	1.6 km	MPC · JPL
287402	2002 VS_{103}	—	November 12, 2002	Socorro	LINEAR	·	2.9 km	MPC · JPL
287403	2002 VN_{106}	—	November 12, 2002	Socorro	LINEAR	·	3.0 km	MPC · JPL
287404	2002 VB_{110}	—	November 12, 2002	Socorro	LINEAR	·	1.8 km	MPC · JPL
287405	2002 VX_{110}	—	November 13, 2002	Palomar	NEAT	·	2.4 km	MPC · JPL
287406	2002 VT_{113}	—	November 13, 2002	Palomar	NEAT	·	2.0 km	MPC · JPL
287407	2002 VM_{115}	—	November 11, 2002	Anderson Mesa	LONEOS	·	1.7 km	MPC · JPL
287408	2002 VU_{116}	—	November 13, 2002	Palomar	NEAT	·	1.1 km	MPC · JPL
287409	2002 VE_{117}	—	November 13, 2002	Palomar	NEAT	·	2.2 km	MPC · JPL
287410	2002 VA_{122}	—	November 13, 2002	Palomar	NEAT	·	1.6 km	MPC · JPL
287411	2002 VE_{128}	—	November 6, 2002	Haleakala	NEAT	·	2.8 km	MPC · JPL
287412	2002 VY_{132}	—	November 1, 2002	Socorro	LINEAR	·	2.3 km	MPC · JPL
287413	2002 VG_{144}	—	November 12, 2002	Palomar	NEAT	WIT	1.3 km	MPC · JPL
287414	2002 VW_{145}	—	November 15, 2002	Palomar	NEAT	·	2.4 km	MPC · JPL
287415	2002 VB_{146}	—	November 14, 2002	Palomar	NEAT	·	1.4 km	MPC · JPL
287416	2002 WG_{2}	—	November 23, 2002	Palomar	NEAT	·	3.0 km	MPC · JPL
287417	2002 WX_{2}	—	November 24, 2002	Wrightwood	J. W. Young	·	2.5 km	MPC · JPL
287418	2002 WV_{9}	—	November 24, 2002	Palomar	NEAT	·	930 m	MPC · JPL
287419	2002 WF_{13}	—	November 30, 2002	Socorro	LINEAR	H	810 m	MPC · JPL
287420	2002 WE_{20}	—	November 25, 2002	Palomar	S. F. Hönig	·	1.8 km	MPC · JPL
287421	2002 WN_{21}	—	November 24, 2002	Palomar	NEAT	·	4.1 km	MPC · JPL
287422	2002 WS_{21}	—	November 24, 2002	Palomar	NEAT	EOS	2.5 km	MPC · JPL
287423	2002 WZ_{21}	—	November 16, 2002	Palomar	NEAT	·	1.7 km	MPC · JPL
287424	2002 WH_{22}	—	November 24, 2002	Palomar	NEAT	·	2.3 km	MPC · JPL
287425	2002 WJ_{22}	—	November 24, 2002	Palomar	NEAT	·	1.2 km	MPC · JPL
287426	2002 WM_{23}	—	November 24, 2002	Palomar	NEAT	·	1.4 km	MPC · JPL
287427	2002 WP_{23}	—	November 24, 2002	Palomar	NEAT	·	2.5 km	MPC · JPL
287428	2002 WH_{24}	—	November 16, 2002	Palomar	NEAT	·	2.4 km	MPC · JPL
287429	2002 WL_{25}	—	November 22, 2002	Palomar	NEAT	WIT	1.4 km	MPC · JPL
287430	2002 WP_{27}	—	November 23, 2002	Palomar	NEAT	·	1.5 km	MPC · JPL
287431	2002 WH_{28}	—	November 16, 2002	Palomar	NEAT	HOF	3.5 km	MPC · JPL
287432 Bril	2002 WP_{28}	Bril	November 24, 2002	Palomar	NEAT	·	2.3 km	MPC · JPL
287433 de Groot	2002 WQ_{28}	de Groot	November 23, 2002	Palomar	NEAT	TIR	3.6 km	MPC · JPL
287434	2002 WZ_{28}	—	November 22, 2002	Palomar	NEAT	·	1.1 km	MPC · JPL
287435	2002 XM_{3}	—	December 1, 2002	Socorro	LINEAR	·	1.3 km	MPC · JPL
287436	2002 XP_{3}	—	December 2, 2002	Emerald Lane	L. Ball	NYS	1.1 km	MPC · JPL
287437	2002 XA_{6}	—	December 1, 2002	Socorro	LINEAR	·	2.8 km	MPC · JPL
287438	2002 XK_{11}	—	December 3, 2002	Palomar	NEAT	·	1.8 km	MPC · JPL
287439	2002 XL_{23}	—	December 5, 2002	Socorro	LINEAR	EUN	1.6 km	MPC · JPL
287440	2002 XY_{24}	—	December 5, 2002	Socorro	LINEAR	·	5.1 km	MPC · JPL
287441	2002 XW_{33}	—	December 5, 2002	Socorro	LINEAR	NAE	6.0 km	MPC · JPL
287442	2002 XU_{36}	—	December 6, 2002	Socorro	LINEAR	·	3.8 km	MPC · JPL
287443	2002 XP_{38}	—	December 7, 2002	Socorro	LINEAR	H	820 m	MPC · JPL
287444	2002 XM_{48}	—	December 10, 2002	Socorro	LINEAR	·	2.6 km	MPC · JPL
287445	2002 XU_{57}	—	December 11, 2002	Palomar	NEAT	·	1.6 km	MPC · JPL
287446	2002 XD_{64}	—	December 11, 2002	Socorro	LINEAR	·	2.6 km	MPC · JPL
287447	2002 XO_{64}	—	December 11, 2002	Socorro	LINEAR	·	2.5 km	MPC · JPL
287448	2002 XX_{72}	—	December 11, 2002	Socorro	LINEAR	·	1.4 km	MPC · JPL
287449	2002 XR_{82}	—	December 12, 2002	Palomar	NEAT	·	4.1 km	MPC · JPL
287450	2002 XW_{95}	—	December 5, 2002	Socorro	LINEAR	·	2.4 km	MPC · JPL
287451	2002 XU_{115}	—	December 7, 2002	Apache Point	SDSS	MRX	1.5 km	MPC · JPL
287452	2002 XL_{119}	—	December 10, 2002	Palomar	NEAT	·	4.4 km	MPC · JPL
287453	2002 XU_{119}	—	December 10, 2002	Palomar	NEAT	·	1.5 km	MPC · JPL
287454	2002 YX_{7}	—	December 30, 2002	Bohyunsan	Jeon, Y.-B., Lee, B.-C.	L5	17 km	MPC · JPL
287455	2002 YM_{13}	—	December 31, 2002	Socorro	LINEAR	·	1.3 km	MPC · JPL
287456	2002 YC_{15}	—	December 31, 2002	Kitt Peak	Spacewatch	·	2.6 km	MPC · JPL
287457	2002 YH_{21}	—	December 31, 2002	Socorro	LINEAR	·	2.9 km	MPC · JPL
287458	2002 YG_{23}	—	December 31, 2002	Socorro	LINEAR	·	1.4 km	MPC · JPL
287459	2002 YP_{24}	—	December 31, 2002	Socorro	LINEAR	·	1.4 km	MPC · JPL
287460	2002 YW_{32}	—	December 27, 2002	Palomar	NEAT	·	2.1 km	MPC · JPL
287461	2002 YD_{33}	—	December 30, 2002	Socorro	LINEAR	·	6.4 km	MPC · JPL
287462	2003 AX_{6}	—	January 2, 2003	Socorro	LINEAR	MAR	1.1 km	MPC · JPL
287463	2003 AD_{19}	—	January 4, 2003	Socorro	LINEAR	·	2.5 km	MPC · JPL
287464	2003 AZ_{20}	—	January 5, 2003	Socorro	LINEAR	·	5.4 km	MPC · JPL
287465	2003 AX_{24}	—	January 4, 2003	Socorro	LINEAR	V	950 m	MPC · JPL
287466	2003 AE_{30}	—	January 4, 2003	Socorro	LINEAR	·	4.0 km	MPC · JPL
287467	2003 AL_{35}	—	January 7, 2003	Socorro	LINEAR	·	1.6 km	MPC · JPL
287468	2003 AZ_{36}	—	January 7, 2003	Socorro	LINEAR	·	1.6 km	MPC · JPL
287469	2003 AC_{37}	—	January 7, 2003	Socorro	LINEAR	LIX	4.7 km	MPC · JPL
287470	2003 AE_{42}	—	January 7, 2003	Socorro	LINEAR	·	2.0 km	MPC · JPL
287471	2003 AK_{46}	—	January 5, 2003	Socorro	LINEAR	·	3.9 km	MPC · JPL
287472	2003 AJ_{53}	—	January 5, 2003	Socorro	LINEAR	·	2.4 km	MPC · JPL
287473	2003 AO_{62}	—	January 8, 2003	Socorro	LINEAR	·	2.6 km	MPC · JPL
287474	2003 AQ_{62}	—	January 8, 2003	Socorro	LINEAR	NYS	1.6 km	MPC · JPL
287475	2003 AY_{66}	—	January 7, 2003	Socorro	LINEAR	·	2.1 km	MPC · JPL
287476	2003 AT_{71}	—	January 10, 2003	Socorro	LINEAR	H	750 m	MPC · JPL
287477	2003 AG_{73}	—	January 11, 2003	Kitt Peak	Spacewatch	·	2.3 km	MPC · JPL
287478	2003 AR_{78}	—	January 10, 2003	Kitt Peak	Spacewatch	·	3.2 km	MPC · JPL
287479	2003 AS_{80}	—	January 11, 2003	Socorro	LINEAR	HNS	1.8 km	MPC · JPL
287480	2003 AJ_{84}	—	January 11, 2003	Goodricke-Pigott	R. A. Tucker	EUP	5.4 km	MPC · JPL
287481	2003 AW_{85}	—	January 7, 2003	Socorro	LINEAR	(5)	1.8 km	MPC · JPL
287482	2003 AU_{94}	—	January 11, 2003	Kitt Peak	Spacewatch	·	2.3 km	MPC · JPL
287483	2003 BS_{5}	—	January 24, 2003	La Silla	A. Boattini, H. Scholl	·	4.0 km	MPC · JPL
287484	2003 BF_{9}	—	January 26, 2003	Anderson Mesa	LONEOS	·	4.7 km	MPC · JPL
287485	2003 BG_{9}	—	January 26, 2003	Anderson Mesa	LONEOS	EUN	1.6 km	MPC · JPL
287486	2003 BG_{12}	—	January 26, 2003	Anderson Mesa	LONEOS	·	2.4 km	MPC · JPL
287487	2003 BZ_{14}	—	January 26, 2003	Haleakala	NEAT	·	4.4 km	MPC · JPL
287488	2003 BA_{17}	—	January 26, 2003	Haleakala	NEAT	·	1.3 km	MPC · JPL
287489	2003 BR_{17}	—	January 27, 2003	Socorro	LINEAR	·	2.7 km	MPC · JPL
287490	2003 BJ_{19}	—	January 26, 2003	Anderson Mesa	LONEOS	·	3.8 km	MPC · JPL
287491	2003 BK_{19}	—	January 26, 2003	Anderson Mesa	LONEOS	·	950 m	MPC · JPL
287492	2003 BX_{24}	—	January 25, 2003	Palomar	NEAT	·	4.4 km	MPC · JPL
287493	2003 BB_{28}	—	January 26, 2003	Haleakala	NEAT	·	3.8 km	MPC · JPL
287494	2003 BJ_{28}	—	January 26, 2003	Haleakala	NEAT	·	1.3 km	MPC · JPL
287495	2003 BV_{30}	—	January 27, 2003	Socorro	LINEAR	TIR	3.1 km	MPC · JPL
287496	2003 BS_{31}	—	January 27, 2003	Socorro	LINEAR	·	870 m	MPC · JPL
287497	2003 BV_{32}	—	January 27, 2003	Palomar	NEAT	PHO	1.4 km	MPC · JPL
287498	2003 BW_{32}	—	January 27, 2003	Palomar	NEAT	·	2.8 km	MPC · JPL
287499	2003 BJ_{38}	—	January 27, 2003	Anderson Mesa	LONEOS	·	5.7 km	MPC · JPL
287500	2003 BO_{38}	—	January 27, 2003	Anderson Mesa	LONEOS	·	1.2 km	MPC · JPL

== 287501–287600 ==
back to top

Designation			Discovery			Properties		Ref
Permanent	Provisional	Named after	Date	Site	Discoverer(s)	Category	Diam.	Ref
287501	2003 BS_{38}	—	January 27, 2003	Socorro	LINEAR	·	3.2 km	MPC · JPL
287502	2003 BQ_{43}	—	January 27, 2003	Socorro	LINEAR	·	4.6 km	MPC · JPL
287503	2003 BB_{45}	—	January 27, 2003	Kitt Peak	Spacewatch	·	2.3 km	MPC · JPL
287504	2003 BD_{48}	—	January 27, 2003	Anderson Mesa	LONEOS	·	4.1 km	MPC · JPL
287505	2003 BO_{55}	—	January 27, 2003	Palomar	NEAT	·	2.8 km	MPC · JPL
287506	2003 BS_{56}	—	January 27, 2003	Anderson Mesa	LONEOS	·	2.8 km	MPC · JPL
287507	2003 BQ_{58}	—	January 27, 2003	Socorro	LINEAR	DOR	3.2 km	MPC · JPL
287508	2003 BF_{62}	—	January 28, 2003	Palomar	NEAT	(5)	1.6 km	MPC · JPL
287509	2003 BL_{63}	—	January 28, 2003	Kitt Peak	Spacewatch	WAT	1.8 km	MPC · JPL
287510	2003 BM_{63}	—	January 28, 2003	Socorro	LINEAR	·	6.6 km	MPC · JPL
287511	2003 BP_{65}	—	January 30, 2003	Anderson Mesa	LONEOS	(5)	1.5 km	MPC · JPL
287512	2003 BV_{69}	—	January 30, 2003	Palomar	NEAT	·	1.2 km	MPC · JPL
287513	2003 BA_{73}	—	January 28, 2003	Palomar	NEAT	·	2.4 km	MPC · JPL
287514	2003 BD_{73}	—	January 28, 2003	Haleakala	NEAT	·	1.7 km	MPC · JPL
287515	2003 BM_{75}	—	January 29, 2003	Palomar	NEAT	·	5.2 km	MPC · JPL
287516	2003 BY_{76}	—	January 29, 2003	Palomar	NEAT	·	3.5 km	MPC · JPL
287517	2003 BA_{78}	—	January 30, 2003	Haleakala	NEAT	·	1.1 km	MPC · JPL
287518	2003 BW_{83}	—	January 31, 2003	Anderson Mesa	LONEOS	·	2.2 km	MPC · JPL
287519	2003 BB_{93}	—	January 25, 2003	Palomar	NEAT	·	2.8 km	MPC · JPL
287520	2003 CU_{5}	—	February 1, 2003	Socorro	LINEAR	·	5.5 km	MPC · JPL
287521	2003 CU_{8}	—	February 1, 2003	Haleakala	NEAT	·	5.4 km	MPC · JPL
287522	2003 CS_{10}	—	February 3, 2003	Palomar	NEAT	EOS ·	4.6 km	MPC · JPL
287523	2003 CX_{10}	—	February 3, 2003	Anderson Mesa	LONEOS	H	820 m	MPC · JPL
287524	2003 CT_{12}	—	February 2, 2003	Anderson Mesa	LONEOS	·	2.8 km	MPC · JPL
287525	2003 CP_{16}	—	January 31, 2003	Socorro	LINEAR	·	1.6 km	MPC · JPL
287526	2003 CH_{25}	—	February 7, 2003	Kitt Peak	Spacewatch	·	2.8 km	MPC · JPL
287527	2003 DV	—	February 21, 2003	Palomar	NEAT	·	890 m	MPC · JPL
287528	2003 DD_{1}	—	February 21, 2003	Palomar	NEAT	ARM	4.8 km	MPC · JPL
287529	2003 DU_{1}	—	February 21, 2003	Palomar	NEAT	·	2.7 km	MPC · JPL
287530	2003 DH_{4}	—	February 20, 2003	Haleakala	NEAT	·	2.0 km	MPC · JPL
287531	2003 DZ_{6}	—	February 23, 2003	Campo Imperatore	CINEOS	·	1.6 km	MPC · JPL
287532	2003 DF_{8}	—	February 22, 2003	Palomar	NEAT	MRX	1.3 km	MPC · JPL
287533	2003 DP_{8}	—	February 22, 2003	Palomar	NEAT	·	2.0 km	MPC · JPL
287534	2003 DY_{12}	—	February 26, 2003	Campo Imperatore	CINEOS	·	3.9 km	MPC · JPL
287535	2003 DM_{14}	—	February 24, 2003	Haleakala	NEAT	·	5.2 km	MPC · JPL
287536	2003 DX_{23}	—	February 22, 2003	Palomar	NEAT	·	800 m	MPC · JPL
287537	2003 EN_{2}	—	March 5, 2003	Socorro	LINEAR	MAS	910 m	MPC · JPL
287538	2003 ED_{8}	—	March 6, 2003	Anderson Mesa	LONEOS	·	2.0 km	MPC · JPL
287539	2003 ER_{11}	—	March 6, 2003	Socorro	LINEAR	EUP	6.4 km	MPC · JPL
287540	2003 EK_{18}	—	March 6, 2003	Anderson Mesa	LONEOS	THM	3.1 km	MPC · JPL
287541	2003 EE_{20}	—	March 6, 2003	Anderson Mesa	LONEOS	EUN	2.0 km	MPC · JPL
287542	2003 EO_{20}	—	March 6, 2003	Anderson Mesa	LONEOS	(2076)	1.4 km	MPC · JPL
287543	2003 EQ_{21}	—	March 6, 2003	Socorro	LINEAR	·	1.4 km	MPC · JPL
287544	2003 EV_{22}	—	March 6, 2003	Socorro	LINEAR	·	2.2 km	MPC · JPL
287545	2003 ED_{30}	—	March 6, 2003	Palomar	NEAT	V	930 m	MPC · JPL
287546	2003 ET_{33}	—	March 7, 2003	Anderson Mesa	LONEOS	·	2.8 km	MPC · JPL
287547	2003 EO_{42}	—	March 9, 2003	Socorro	LINEAR	V	800 m	MPC · JPL
287548	2003 EB_{45}	—	March 7, 2003	Socorro	LINEAR	·	2.8 km	MPC · JPL
287549	2003 EO_{45}	—	March 7, 2003	Socorro	LINEAR	·	5.2 km	MPC · JPL
287550	2003 EV_{45}	—	March 7, 2003	Socorro	LINEAR	·	730 m	MPC · JPL
287551	2003 EW_{49}	—	March 10, 2003	Palomar	NEAT	·	950 m	MPC · JPL
287552	2003 EL_{51}	—	March 11, 2003	Palomar	NEAT	·	5.5 km	MPC · JPL
287553	2003 EY_{53}	—	March 9, 2003	Socorro	LINEAR	T_{j} (2.89)	3.9 km	MPC · JPL
287554	2003 EM_{62}	—	March 9, 2003	Socorro	LINEAR	EUP	6.7 km	MPC · JPL
287555	2003 FM	—	March 22, 2003	Palomar	NEAT	·	1.5 km	MPC · JPL
287556	2003 FP_{3}	—	March 24, 2003	Palomar	NEAT	EUP	6.4 km	MPC · JPL
287557	2003 FG_{7}	—	March 28, 2003	Piszkéstető	K. Sárneczky	(2076)	1.2 km	MPC · JPL
287558	2003 FN_{10}	—	March 23, 2003	Kitt Peak	Spacewatch	·	1.8 km	MPC · JPL
287559	2003 FT_{12}	—	March 23, 2003	Kitt Peak	Spacewatch	·	7.0 km	MPC · JPL
287560	2003 FZ_{16}	—	March 24, 2003	Kitt Peak	Spacewatch	MRX	1.0 km	MPC · JPL
287561	2003 FQ_{18}	—	March 24, 2003	Kitt Peak	Spacewatch	·	2.1 km	MPC · JPL
287562	2003 FV_{18}	—	March 24, 2003	Kitt Peak	Spacewatch	·	980 m	MPC · JPL
287563	2003 FS_{19}	—	March 25, 2003	Palomar	NEAT	·	2.7 km	MPC · JPL
287564	2003 FU_{21}	—	March 25, 2003	Kitt Peak	Spacewatch	V	610 m	MPC · JPL
287565	2003 FX_{21}	—	March 25, 2003	Kitt Peak	Spacewatch	·	1.2 km	MPC · JPL
287566	2003 FG_{22}	—	March 25, 2003	Catalina	CSS	·	4.0 km	MPC · JPL
287567	2003 FV_{23}	—	March 23, 2003	Kitt Peak	Spacewatch	·	3.8 km	MPC · JPL
287568	2003 FR_{24}	—	March 24, 2003	Kitt Peak	Spacewatch	MAS	850 m	MPC · JPL
287569	2003 FZ_{25}	—	March 24, 2003	Kitt Peak	Spacewatch	NYS	1.1 km	MPC · JPL
287570	2003 FU_{26}	—	March 24, 2003	Kitt Peak	Spacewatch	EMA	3.5 km	MPC · JPL
287571	2003 FM_{27}	—	March 24, 2003	Kitt Peak	Spacewatch	·	3.2 km	MPC · JPL
287572	2003 FX_{27}	—	March 24, 2003	Kitt Peak	Spacewatch	·	800 m	MPC · JPL
287573	2003 FM_{31}	—	March 23, 2003	Kitt Peak	Spacewatch	EOS	2.6 km	MPC · JPL
287574	2003 FU_{32}	—	March 23, 2003	Kitt Peak	Spacewatch	L4	10 km	MPC · JPL
287575	2003 FO_{35}	—	March 23, 2003	Kitt Peak	Spacewatch	·	2.6 km	MPC · JPL
287576	2003 FE_{38}	—	March 23, 2003	Kitt Peak	Spacewatch	·	3.2 km	MPC · JPL
287577	2003 FE_{42}	—	March 31, 2003	Wrightwood	J. W. Young	L4 · ERY	9.8 km	MPC · JPL
287578	2003 FX_{44}	—	March 24, 2003	Kitt Peak	Spacewatch	·	2.3 km	MPC · JPL
287579	2003 FX_{58}	—	March 26, 2003	Palomar	NEAT	EUN	1.7 km	MPC · JPL
287580	2003 FQ_{64}	—	March 26, 2003	Palomar	NEAT	NYS	1.1 km	MPC · JPL
287581	2003 FO_{65}	—	March 26, 2003	Palomar	NEAT	·	2.1 km	MPC · JPL
287582	2003 FQ_{69}	—	March 26, 2003	Palomar	NEAT	·	2.3 km	MPC · JPL
287583	2003 FQ_{88}	—	March 28, 2003	Kitt Peak	Spacewatch	·	1.3 km	MPC · JPL
287584	2003 FJ_{89}	—	March 29, 2003	Anderson Mesa	LONEOS	·	1.8 km	MPC · JPL
287585	2003 FQ_{91}	—	March 29, 2003	Anderson Mesa	LONEOS	ADE	2.7 km	MPC · JPL
287586	2003 FQ_{92}	—	March 29, 2003	Anderson Mesa	LONEOS	NYS	1.2 km	MPC · JPL
287587	2003 FC_{102}	—	March 31, 2003	Socorro	LINEAR	·	1.8 km	MPC · JPL
287588	2003 FX_{105}	—	March 26, 2003	Palomar	NEAT	·	1.6 km	MPC · JPL
287589	2003 FN_{106}	—	March 26, 2003	Palomar	NEAT	·	1.1 km	MPC · JPL
287590	2003 FK_{108}	—	March 30, 2003	Socorro	LINEAR	·	2.5 km	MPC · JPL
287591	2003 FS_{108}	—	March 31, 2003	Anderson Mesa	LONEOS	·	900 m	MPC · JPL
287592	2003 FC_{117}	—	March 24, 2003	Kitt Peak	Spacewatch	V	850 m	MPC · JPL
287593	2003 FD_{119}	—	March 26, 2003	Anderson Mesa	LONEOS	·	1.1 km	MPC · JPL
287594	2003 FK_{122}	—	March 31, 2003	Cerro Tololo	Deep Lens Survey	BRA	2.1 km	MPC · JPL
287595	2003 FG_{123}	—	March 26, 2003	Anderson Mesa	LONEOS	·	4.0 km	MPC · JPL
287596	2003 FR_{123}	—	March 27, 2003	Kitt Peak	Spacewatch	·	1.1 km	MPC · JPL
287597	2003 FJ_{126}	—	March 31, 2003	Kitt Peak	Spacewatch	(194)	2.0 km	MPC · JPL
287598	2003 FY_{131}	—	March 24, 2003	Haleakala	NEAT	·	1.9 km	MPC · JPL
287599	2003 FM_{132}	—	March 24, 2003	Kitt Peak	Spacewatch	·	2.2 km	MPC · JPL
287600	2003 FH_{133}	—	March 26, 2003	Kitt Peak	Spacewatch	L4	9.9 km	MPC · JPL

== 287601–287700 ==
back to top

Designation			Discovery			Properties		Ref
Permanent	Provisional	Named after	Date	Site	Discoverer(s)	Category	Diam.	Ref
287601	2003 GN	—	April 1, 2003	Socorro	LINEAR	H	600 m	MPC · JPL
287602	2003 GS_{5}	—	April 1, 2003	Socorro	LINEAR	·	850 m	MPC · JPL
287603	2003 GO_{15}	—	April 3, 2003	Anderson Mesa	LONEOS	·	1.0 km	MPC · JPL
287604	2003 GQ_{24}	—	April 7, 2003	Kitt Peak	Spacewatch	·	840 m	MPC · JPL
287605	2003 GH_{29}	—	April 7, 2003	Socorro	LINEAR	·	2.4 km	MPC · JPL
287606	2003 GD_{36}	—	April 5, 2003	Anderson Mesa	LONEOS	EUN	2.0 km	MPC · JPL
287607	2003 GZ_{37}	—	April 8, 2003	Kitt Peak	Spacewatch	AGN	1.4 km	MPC · JPL
287608	2003 GW_{39}	—	April 8, 2003	Kitt Peak	Spacewatch	·	5.2 km	MPC · JPL
287609	2003 GU_{40}	—	April 9, 2003	Palomar	NEAT	·	1.3 km	MPC · JPL
287610	2003 GF_{47}	—	April 7, 2003	Kitt Peak	Spacewatch	·	1.8 km	MPC · JPL
287611	2003 GL_{48}	—	April 9, 2003	Palomar	NEAT	EOS	4.1 km	MPC · JPL
287612	2003 GD_{54}	—	April 3, 2003	Anderson Mesa	LONEOS	V	940 m	MPC · JPL
287613	2003 GL_{54}	—	April 1, 2003	Anderson Mesa	LONEOS	·	5.0 km	MPC · JPL
287614	2003 GV_{56}	—	April 5, 2003	Kitt Peak	Spacewatch	·	2.1 km	MPC · JPL
287615	2003 HK	—	April 21, 2003	Catalina	CSS	·	860 m	MPC · JPL
287616	2003 HG_{4}	—	April 24, 2003	Anderson Mesa	LONEOS	V	870 m	MPC · JPL
287617	2003 HY_{7}	—	April 24, 2003	Anderson Mesa	LONEOS	V	750 m	MPC · JPL
287618	2003 HU_{12}	—	April 24, 2003	Kitt Peak	Spacewatch	·	3.9 km	MPC · JPL
287619	2003 HD_{13}	—	April 24, 2003	Kitt Peak	Spacewatch	·	900 m	MPC · JPL
287620	2003 HW_{13}	—	April 25, 2003	Campo Imperatore	CINEOS	fast	3.8 km	MPC · JPL
287621	2003 HE_{14}	—	April 26, 2003	Kitt Peak	Spacewatch	·	2.3 km	MPC · JPL
287622	2003 HO_{16}	—	April 28, 2003	Emerald Lane	L. Ball	·	1.4 km	MPC · JPL
287623	2003 HW_{16}	—	April 24, 2003	Anderson Mesa	LONEOS	·	2.0 km	MPC · JPL
287624	2003 HA_{17}	—	April 24, 2003	Anderson Mesa	LONEOS	·	2.6 km	MPC · JPL
287625	2003 HC_{22}	—	April 27, 2003	Anderson Mesa	LONEOS	·	780 m	MPC · JPL
287626	2003 HT_{29}	—	April 28, 2003	Anderson Mesa	LONEOS	·	1.0 km	MPC · JPL
287627	2003 HL_{33}	—	April 26, 2003	Kitt Peak	Spacewatch	·	5.1 km	MPC · JPL
287628	2003 HV_{33}	—	April 28, 2003	Kitt Peak	Spacewatch	·	1.7 km	MPC · JPL
287629	2003 HO_{34}	—	April 29, 2003	Kitt Peak	Spacewatch	NYS	1.3 km	MPC · JPL
287630	2003 HP_{34}	—	April 29, 2003	Kitt Peak	Spacewatch	DOR	3.0 km	MPC · JPL
287631	2003 HY_{34}	—	April 26, 2003	Kitt Peak	Spacewatch	·	2.3 km	MPC · JPL
287632	2003 HM_{35}	—	April 26, 2003	Kitt Peak	Spacewatch	·	2.2 km	MPC · JPL
287633	2003 HN_{35}	—	April 26, 2003	Kitt Peak	Spacewatch	·	900 m	MPC · JPL
287634	2003 HH_{43}	—	April 29, 2003	Anderson Mesa	LONEOS	LIX	5.3 km	MPC · JPL
287635	2003 HJ_{45}	—	April 29, 2003	Socorro	LINEAR	·	5.5 km	MPC · JPL
287636	2003 HW_{54}	—	April 24, 2003	Campo Imperatore	CINEOS	·	1.7 km	MPC · JPL
287637	2003 HZ_{54}	—	April 25, 2003	Kitt Peak	Spacewatch	MAS	850 m	MPC · JPL
287638	2003 HP_{58}	—	April 25, 2003	Kitt Peak	Spacewatch	·	5.4 km	MPC · JPL
287639	2003 JZ_{1}	—	May 1, 2003	Kitt Peak	Spacewatch	·	990 m	MPC · JPL
287640	2003 JP_{2}	—	May 1, 2003	Kitt Peak	Spacewatch	·	4.8 km	MPC · JPL
287641	2003 JA_{4}	—	May 3, 2003	Kleť	Kleť	·	3.5 km	MPC · JPL
287642	2003 JV_{5}	—	May 1, 2003	Kitt Peak	Spacewatch	·	1.6 km	MPC · JPL
287643	2003 JP_{16}	—	May 9, 2003	Haleakala	NEAT	T_{j} (2.98) · EUP	6.5 km	MPC · JPL
287644	2003 JD_{18}	—	May 2, 2003	Socorro	LINEAR	·	1.8 km	MPC · JPL
287645	2003 KW_{6}	—	May 25, 2003	Kitt Peak	Spacewatch	·	1.5 km	MPC · JPL
287646	2003 KD_{7}	—	May 23, 2003	Kitt Peak	Spacewatch	·	720 m	MPC · JPL
287647	2003 KR_{7}	—	May 25, 2003	Kitt Peak	Spacewatch	·	2.1 km	MPC · JPL
287648	2003 KC_{10}	—	May 22, 2003	Kitt Peak	Spacewatch	H	610 m	MPC · JPL
287649	2003 KF_{15}	—	May 25, 2003	Kitt Peak	Spacewatch	·	3.5 km	MPC · JPL
287650	2003 KM_{16}	—	May 26, 2003	Haleakala	NEAT	·	2.0 km	MPC · JPL
287651	2003 KV_{17}	—	May 27, 2003	Haleakala	NEAT	·	3.1 km	MPC · JPL
287652	2003 KV_{19}	—	May 30, 2003	Socorro	LINEAR	·	2.1 km	MPC · JPL
287653	2003 KZ_{29}	—	May 25, 2003	Nogales	Tenagra II	·	2.6 km	MPC · JPL
287654	2003 LK_{9}	—	June 2, 2003	Nogales	Tenagra II	·	1.2 km	MPC · JPL
287655	2003 MW_{2}	—	June 25, 2003	Nogales	M. Schwartz, P. R. Holvorcem	·	1.3 km	MPC · JPL
287656	2003 MF_{4}	—	June 23, 2003	Nogales	M. Schwartz, P. R. Holvorcem	·	4.8 km	MPC · JPL
287657	2003 ME_{5}	—	June 26, 2003	Socorro	LINEAR	·	1.9 km	MPC · JPL
287658	2003 MJ_{8}	—	June 28, 2003	Socorro	LINEAR	·	3.9 km	MPC · JPL
287659	2003 MV_{9}	—	June 28, 2003	Reedy Creek	J. Broughton	·	3.9 km	MPC · JPL
287660	2003 ND_{1}	—	July 2, 2003	Haleakala	NEAT	·	1.2 km	MPC · JPL
287661	2003 NZ_{4}	—	July 4, 2003	Reedy Creek	J. Broughton	·	2.9 km	MPC · JPL
287662	2003 NW_{6}	—	July 7, 2003	Reedy Creek	J. Broughton	·	1.3 km	MPC · JPL
287663	2003 NY_{11}	—	July 3, 2003	Kitt Peak	Spacewatch	·	2.8 km	MPC · JPL
287664	2003 NS_{12}	—	July 3, 2003	Kitt Peak	Spacewatch	EUN	1.5 km	MPC · JPL
287665	2003 OD_{2}	—	July 22, 2003	Haleakala	NEAT	·	1.0 km	MPC · JPL
287666	2003 OS_{4}	—	July 22, 2003	Haleakala	NEAT	·	1.0 km	MPC · JPL
287667	2003 OH_{8}	—	July 26, 2003	Reedy Creek	J. Broughton	·	840 m	MPC · JPL
287668	2003 OQ_{8}	—	July 26, 2003	Reedy Creek	J. Broughton	·	1.4 km	MPC · JPL
287669	2003 OM_{12}	—	July 23, 2003	Palomar	NEAT	·	1.6 km	MPC · JPL
287670	2003 OT_{20}	—	July 31, 2003	Reedy Creek	J. Broughton	slow	4.4 km	MPC · JPL
287671	2003 OE_{23}	—	July 30, 2003	Campo Imperatore	CINEOS	·	1.1 km	MPC · JPL
287672	2003 OH_{27}	—	July 24, 2003	Palomar	NEAT	MAS	960 m	MPC · JPL
287673	2003 PU_{1}	—	August 1, 2003	Haleakala	NEAT	·	890 m	MPC · JPL
287674	2003 PR_{6}	—	August 1, 2003	Socorro	LINEAR	TIR	3.0 km	MPC · JPL
287675	2003 QE_{1}	—	August 19, 2003	Campo Imperatore	CINEOS	·	1.4 km	MPC · JPL
287676	2003 QP_{1}	—	August 19, 2003	Campo Imperatore	CINEOS	EOS ·	5.0 km	MPC · JPL
287677	2003 QB_{4}	—	August 18, 2003	Haleakala	NEAT	·	1.2 km	MPC · JPL
287678	2003 QY_{4}	—	August 20, 2003	Campo Imperatore	CINEOS	·	2.2 km	MPC · JPL
287679	2003 QV_{6}	—	August 20, 2003	Campo Imperatore	CINEOS	·	1.2 km	MPC · JPL
287680	2003 QG_{14}	—	August 20, 2003	Palomar	NEAT	·	2.9 km	MPC · JPL
287681	2003 QO_{14}	—	August 20, 2003	Palomar	NEAT	·	2.9 km	MPC · JPL
287682	2003 QX_{14}	—	August 20, 2003	Palomar	NEAT	·	4.4 km	MPC · JPL
287683	2003 QA_{17}	—	August 21, 2003	Campo Imperatore	CINEOS	·	3.8 km	MPC · JPL
287684	2003 QQ_{17}	—	August 22, 2003	Palomar	NEAT	·	1.9 km	MPC · JPL
287685	2003 QA_{18}	—	August 22, 2003	Palomar	NEAT	·	840 m	MPC · JPL
287686	2003 QK_{18}	—	August 22, 2003	Socorro	LINEAR	·	1.6 km	MPC · JPL
287687	2003 QS_{19}	—	August 22, 2003	Palomar	NEAT	·	890 m	MPC · JPL
287688	2003 QY_{20}	—	August 22, 2003	Palomar	NEAT	·	1.2 km	MPC · JPL
287689	2003 QN_{21}	—	August 22, 2003	Palomar	NEAT	·	2.3 km	MPC · JPL
287690	2003 QF_{22}	—	August 20, 2003	Palomar	NEAT	V	990 m	MPC · JPL
287691	2003 QD_{23}	—	August 20, 2003	Palomar	NEAT	·	5.4 km	MPC · JPL
287692	2003 QX_{27}	—	August 23, 2003	Kleť	Kleť	EUN	1.5 km	MPC · JPL
287693 Hugonnaivilma	2003 QD_{31}	Hugonnaivilma	August 24, 2003	Piszkéstető	K. Sárneczky, B. Sipőcz	NYS	1.1 km	MPC · JPL
287694	2003 QL_{31}	—	August 20, 2003	Palomar	NEAT	EUP	4.8 km	MPC · JPL
287695	2003 QM_{31}	—	August 21, 2003	Haleakala	NEAT	·	1.7 km	MPC · JPL
287696	2003 QD_{34}	—	August 22, 2003	Palomar	NEAT	·	1.5 km	MPC · JPL
287697	2003 QA_{36}	—	August 22, 2003	Socorro	LINEAR	·	2.8 km	MPC · JPL
287698	2003 QP_{37}	—	August 22, 2003	Palomar	NEAT	·	1.3 km	MPC · JPL
287699	2003 QG_{38}	—	August 22, 2003	Socorro	LINEAR	NYS	1.5 km	MPC · JPL
287700	2003 QJ_{43}	—	August 22, 2003	Haleakala	NEAT	·	2.1 km	MPC · JPL

== 287701–287800 ==
back to top

Designation			Discovery			Properties		Ref
Permanent	Provisional	Named after	Date	Site	Discoverer(s)	Category	Diam.	Ref
287701	2003 QC_{45}	—	August 23, 2003	Socorro	LINEAR	(2076)	1.1 km	MPC · JPL
287702	2003 QE_{46}	—	August 23, 2003	Palomar	NEAT	·	1.3 km	MPC · JPL
287703	2003 QR_{48}	—	August 21, 2003	Palomar	NEAT	·	5.9 km	MPC · JPL
287704	2003 QE_{49}	—	August 22, 2003	Palomar	NEAT	·	2.4 km	MPC · JPL
287705	2003 QC_{53}	—	August 23, 2003	Socorro	LINEAR	·	1.1 km	MPC · JPL
287706	2003 QQ_{53}	—	August 23, 2003	Socorro	LINEAR	·	2.5 km	MPC · JPL
287707	2003 QT_{59}	—	August 23, 2003	Socorro	LINEAR	·	2.7 km	MPC · JPL
287708	2003 QW_{62}	—	August 23, 2003	Socorro	LINEAR	·	780 m	MPC · JPL
287709	2003 QT_{68}	—	August 26, 2003	Socorro	LINEAR	·	1.6 km	MPC · JPL
287710	2003 QB_{69}	—	August 26, 2003	Reedy Creek	J. Broughton	(5)	1.8 km	MPC · JPL
287711 Filotáslili	2003 QO_{69}	Filotáslili	August 26, 2003	Piszkéstető	K. Sárneczky, B. Sipőcz	·	3.0 km	MPC · JPL
287712	2003 QR_{85}	—	August 24, 2003	Socorro	LINEAR	·	3.9 km	MPC · JPL
287713	2003 QB_{87}	—	August 25, 2003	Socorro	LINEAR	·	4.3 km	MPC · JPL
287714	2003 QC_{90}	—	August 26, 2003	Cerro Tololo	M. W. Buie	KOR	1.3 km	MPC · JPL
287715	2003 QH_{94}	—	August 28, 2003	Haleakala	NEAT	·	820 m	MPC · JPL
287716	2003 QC_{95}	—	August 29, 2003	Haleakala	NEAT	·	1.2 km	MPC · JPL
287717	2003 QD_{95}	—	August 29, 2003	Haleakala	NEAT	·	2.5 km	MPC · JPL
287718	2003 QK_{95}	—	August 30, 2003	Kitt Peak	Spacewatch	·	760 m	MPC · JPL
287719	2003 QC_{102}	—	August 30, 2003	Kitt Peak	Spacewatch	·	1.2 km	MPC · JPL
287720	2003 QA_{105}	—	August 31, 2003	Kitt Peak	Spacewatch	·	4.1 km	MPC · JPL
287721	2003 QB_{110}	—	August 31, 2003	Kitt Peak	Spacewatch	·	860 m	MPC · JPL
287722	2003 QR_{114}	—	August 25, 2003	Palomar	NEAT	·	2.4 km	MPC · JPL
287723	2003 QX_{119}	—	August 27, 2003	Palomar	NEAT	·	3.6 km	MPC · JPL
287724	2003 QB_{120}	—	August 28, 2003	Palomar	NEAT	·	2.7 km	MPC · JPL
287725	2003 RG	—	September 1, 2003	Socorro	LINEAR	·	1.3 km	MPC · JPL
287726	2003 RC_{8}	—	September 4, 2003	Campo Imperatore	CINEOS	H	800 m	MPC · JPL
287727	2003 RX_{8}	—	September 1, 2003	Socorro	LINEAR	·	2.6 km	MPC · JPL
287728	2003 RF_{12}	—	September 13, 2003	Haleakala	NEAT	·	1.3 km	MPC · JPL
287729	2003 RD_{15}	—	September 15, 2003	Palomar	NEAT	·	730 m	MPC · JPL
287730	2003 RB_{19}	—	September 15, 2003	Anderson Mesa	LONEOS	·	2.1 km	MPC · JPL
287731	2003 RN_{19}	—	September 15, 2003	Anderson Mesa	LONEOS	·	890 m	MPC · JPL
287732	2003 RS_{21}	—	September 13, 2003	Haleakala	NEAT	·	930 m	MPC · JPL
287733	2003 RT_{25}	—	September 15, 2003	Palomar	NEAT	EUN	1.3 km	MPC · JPL
287734	2003 RD_{27}	—	September 3, 2003	Socorro	LINEAR	·	1.8 km	MPC · JPL
287735	2003 SM_{1}	—	September 16, 2003	Kitt Peak	Spacewatch	·	1.2 km	MPC · JPL
287736	2003 SZ_{4}	—	September 16, 2003	Kitt Peak	Spacewatch	·	1.4 km	MPC · JPL
287737	2003 SX_{5}	—	September 16, 2003	Palomar	NEAT	·	1.1 km	MPC · JPL
287738	2003 SG_{6}	—	September 16, 2003	Haleakala	NEAT	V	1.1 km	MPC · JPL
287739	2003 SA_{8}	—	September 16, 2003	Palomar	NEAT	·	1.9 km	MPC · JPL
287740	2003 SU_{9}	—	September 17, 2003	Kitt Peak	Spacewatch	·	1.3 km	MPC · JPL
287741	2003 SA_{12}	—	September 16, 2003	Kitt Peak	Spacewatch	·	3.3 km	MPC · JPL
287742	2003 SL_{12}	—	September 16, 2003	Palomar	NEAT	NYS	1.1 km	MPC · JPL
287743	2003 SN_{16}	—	September 17, 2003	Kitt Peak	Spacewatch	·	3.7 km	MPC · JPL
287744	2003 SS_{23}	—	September 17, 2003	Kitt Peak	Spacewatch	·	3.6 km	MPC · JPL
287745	2003 SJ_{24}	—	September 17, 2003	Palomar	NEAT	H	840 m	MPC · JPL
287746	2003 SR_{26}	—	September 17, 2003	Haleakala	NEAT	·	780 m	MPC · JPL
287747	2003 SV_{26}	—	September 18, 2003	Palomar	NEAT	·	770 m	MPC · JPL
287748	2003 SX_{30}	—	September 18, 2003	Kitt Peak	Spacewatch	EOS	2.1 km	MPC · JPL
287749	2003 SJ_{32}	—	September 17, 2003	Palomar	NEAT	·	1.6 km	MPC · JPL
287750	2003 SS_{33}	—	September 18, 2003	Socorro	LINEAR	·	970 m	MPC · JPL
287751	2003 SU_{35}	—	September 17, 2003	Haleakala	NEAT	(883)	1.2 km	MPC · JPL
287752	2003 SG_{38}	—	September 16, 2003	Palomar	NEAT	·	1.8 km	MPC · JPL
287753	2003 SS_{39}	—	September 16, 2003	Palomar	NEAT	·	3.9 km	MPC · JPL
287754	2003 SX_{40}	—	September 17, 2003	Palomar	NEAT	·	3.8 km	MPC · JPL
287755	2003 SR_{41}	—	September 18, 2003	Palomar	NEAT	H	770 m	MPC · JPL
287756	2003 SY_{42}	—	September 16, 2003	Anderson Mesa	LONEOS	·	850 m	MPC · JPL
287757	2003 SS_{48}	—	September 18, 2003	Palomar	NEAT	·	1.5 km	MPC · JPL
287758	2003 ST_{49}	—	September 18, 2003	Palomar	NEAT	·	750 m	MPC · JPL
287759	2003 SN_{54}	—	September 16, 2003	Anderson Mesa	LONEOS	EOS	2.3 km	MPC · JPL
287760	2003 SY_{58}	—	September 17, 2003	Kitt Peak	Spacewatch	·	1.9 km	MPC · JPL
287761	2003 SV_{60}	—	September 17, 2003	Kitt Peak	Spacewatch	·	840 m	MPC · JPL
287762	2003 SH_{61}	—	September 17, 2003	Socorro	LINEAR	MAS	930 m	MPC · JPL
287763	2003 SY_{63}	—	September 17, 2003	Campo Imperatore	CINEOS	·	2.2 km	MPC · JPL
287764	2003 SL_{65}	—	September 18, 2003	Anderson Mesa	LONEOS	·	830 m	MPC · JPL
287765	2003 SU_{65}	—	September 18, 2003	Socorro	LINEAR	·	1.0 km	MPC · JPL
287766	2003 SG_{67}	—	September 19, 2003	Socorro	LINEAR	·	2.1 km	MPC · JPL
287767	2003 SS_{67}	—	September 16, 2003	Kitt Peak	Spacewatch	NYS	1.6 km	MPC · JPL
287768	2003 SE_{69}	—	September 17, 2003	Kitt Peak	Spacewatch	·	800 m	MPC · JPL
287769	2003 SE_{72}	—	September 18, 2003	Kitt Peak	Spacewatch	·	1.6 km	MPC · JPL
287770	2003 SP_{74}	—	September 18, 2003	Kitt Peak	Spacewatch	KON	2.0 km	MPC · JPL
287771	2003 SB_{79}	—	September 19, 2003	Kitt Peak	Spacewatch	·	940 m	MPC · JPL
287772	2003 SE_{82}	—	September 17, 2003	Kitt Peak	Spacewatch	·	1.3 km	MPC · JPL
287773	2003 SD_{83}	—	September 18, 2003	Kitt Peak	Spacewatch	·	1.8 km	MPC · JPL
287774	2003 SA_{86}	—	September 16, 2003	Kitt Peak	Spacewatch	·	3.3 km	MPC · JPL
287775	2003 SD_{88}	—	September 18, 2003	Campo Imperatore	CINEOS	·	1.1 km	MPC · JPL
287776	2003 SA_{89}	—	September 18, 2003	Palomar	NEAT	EMA	4.7 km	MPC · JPL
287777	2003 SO_{91}	—	September 18, 2003	Palomar	NEAT	·	2.6 km	MPC · JPL
287778	2003 SX_{93}	—	September 18, 2003	Kitt Peak	Spacewatch	·	2.3 km	MPC · JPL
287779	2003 SZ_{98}	—	September 19, 2003	Haleakala	NEAT	·	5.6 km	MPC · JPL
287780	2003 SJ_{102}	—	September 20, 2003	Socorro	LINEAR	·	5.3 km	MPC · JPL
287781	2003 SS_{103}	—	September 20, 2003	Socorro	LINEAR	TIR	3.9 km	MPC · JPL
287782	2003 SP_{109}	—	September 20, 2003	Kitt Peak	Spacewatch	·	1.0 km	MPC · JPL
287783	2003 SE_{113}	—	September 16, 2003	Kitt Peak	Spacewatch	EOS	2.0 km	MPC · JPL
287784	2003 SG_{116}	—	September 16, 2003	Socorro	LINEAR	·	1.0 km	MPC · JPL
287785	2003 SX_{117}	—	September 16, 2003	Kitt Peak	Spacewatch	MAS	830 m	MPC · JPL
287786	2003 SN_{119}	—	September 17, 2003	Anderson Mesa	LONEOS	·	1.7 km	MPC · JPL
287787 Karády	2003 SY_{128}	Karády	September 20, 2003	Piszkéstető	K. Sárneczky, B. Sipőcz	·	1.1 km	MPC · JPL
287788	2003 SY_{133}	—	September 18, 2003	Socorro	LINEAR	·	940 m	MPC · JPL
287789	2003 SP_{134}	—	September 18, 2003	Palomar	NEAT	·	1.9 km	MPC · JPL
287790	2003 SB_{139}	—	September 21, 2003	Socorro	LINEAR	·	1.1 km	MPC · JPL
287791	2003 SQ_{140}	—	September 19, 2003	Palomar	NEAT	·	3.4 km	MPC · JPL
287792	2003 SO_{143}	—	September 20, 2003	Palomar	NEAT	·	1.5 km	MPC · JPL
287793	2003 SR_{143}	—	September 21, 2003	Socorro	LINEAR	·	1.2 km	MPC · JPL
287794	2003 SU_{146}	—	September 20, 2003	Palomar	NEAT	·	1.1 km	MPC · JPL
287795	2003 SY_{152}	—	September 19, 2003	Anderson Mesa	LONEOS	·	1.7 km	MPC · JPL
287796	2003 SJ_{155}	—	September 19, 2003	Anderson Mesa	LONEOS	NYS	1.7 km	MPC · JPL
287797	2003 SL_{155}	—	September 19, 2003	Anderson Mesa	LONEOS	·	1.1 km	MPC · JPL
287798	2003 SS_{159}	—	September 22, 2003	Kitt Peak	Spacewatch	·	1 km	MPC · JPL
287799	2003 SK_{161}	—	September 18, 2003	Socorro	LINEAR	·	860 m	MPC · JPL
287800	2003 SO_{161}	—	September 18, 2003	Kitt Peak	Spacewatch	·	1.9 km	MPC · JPL

== 287801–287900 ==
back to top

Designation			Discovery			Properties		Ref
Permanent	Provisional	Named after	Date	Site	Discoverer(s)	Category	Diam.	Ref
287801	2003 SD_{163}	—	September 19, 2003	Kitt Peak	Spacewatch	(5)	1.1 km	MPC · JPL
287802	2003 SG_{163}	—	September 19, 2003	Kitt Peak	Spacewatch	·	4.3 km	MPC · JPL
287803	2003 SU_{165}	—	September 20, 2003	Palomar	NEAT	·	1.7 km	MPC · JPL
287804	2003 SG_{166}	—	September 21, 2003	Kitt Peak	Spacewatch	·	1.9 km	MPC · JPL
287805	2003 SC_{172}	—	September 18, 2003	Socorro	LINEAR	·	1.4 km	MPC · JPL
287806	2003 SH_{172}	—	September 18, 2003	Palomar	NEAT	·	750 m	MPC · JPL
287807	2003 SU_{172}	—	September 18, 2003	Socorro	LINEAR	·	1.4 km	MPC · JPL
287808	2003 SP_{173}	—	September 18, 2003	Palomar	NEAT	EOS	2.4 km	MPC · JPL
287809	2003 SR_{175}	—	September 18, 2003	Kitt Peak	Spacewatch	·	860 m	MPC · JPL
287810	2003 SJ_{176}	—	September 18, 2003	Palomar	NEAT	·	2.5 km	MPC · JPL
287811	2003 SS_{180}	—	September 19, 2003	Kitt Peak	Spacewatch	·	3.0 km	MPC · JPL
287812	2003 SW_{180}	—	September 20, 2003	Kitt Peak	Spacewatch	·	4.0 km	MPC · JPL
287813	2003 SD_{183}	—	September 21, 2003	Kitt Peak	Spacewatch	·	2.7 km	MPC · JPL
287814	2003 SR_{183}	—	September 21, 2003	Socorro	LINEAR	T_{j} (2.99) · 3:2	8.7 km	MPC · JPL
287815	2003 SC_{186}	—	September 22, 2003	Anderson Mesa	LONEOS	·	3.0 km	MPC · JPL
287816	2003 SV_{187}	—	September 22, 2003	Kitt Peak	Spacewatch	·	3.7 km	MPC · JPL
287817	2003 SX_{189}	—	September 24, 2003	Palomar	NEAT	·	780 m	MPC · JPL
287818	2003 SH_{190}	—	September 24, 2003	Haleakala	NEAT	·	1.1 km	MPC · JPL
287819	2003 SN_{190}	—	September 17, 2003	Kitt Peak	Spacewatch	·	1.0 km	MPC · JPL
287820	2003 SE_{193}	—	September 20, 2003	Palomar	NEAT	·	1.6 km	MPC · JPL
287821	2003 SG_{193}	—	September 20, 2003	Palomar	NEAT	·	3.3 km	MPC · JPL
287822	2003 SO_{193}	—	September 20, 2003	Socorro	LINEAR	KON	2.8 km	MPC · JPL
287823	2003 SK_{194}	—	September 20, 2003	Kitt Peak	Spacewatch	·	1.1 km	MPC · JPL
287824	2003 SK_{195}	—	September 20, 2003	Palomar	NEAT	V	880 m	MPC · JPL
287825	2003 SX_{195}	—	September 20, 2003	Palomar	NEAT	·	1.2 km	MPC · JPL
287826	2003 SA_{197}	—	September 21, 2003	Anderson Mesa	LONEOS	·	4.6 km	MPC · JPL
287827	2003 SC_{198}	—	September 21, 2003	Anderson Mesa	LONEOS	·	1.4 km	MPC · JPL
287828	2003 SY_{198}	—	September 21, 2003	Anderson Mesa	LONEOS	·	1.1 km	MPC · JPL
287829 Juancarlos	2003 SB_{201}	Juancarlos	September 23, 2003	Sierra Nevada	Sota, A.	·	1.6 km	MPC · JPL
287830	2003 SL_{201}	—	September 26, 2003	Socorro	LINEAR	H	920 m	MPC · JPL
287831	2003 SM_{201}	—	September 26, 2003	Socorro	LINEAR	H	810 m	MPC · JPL
287832	2003 SD_{203}	—	September 22, 2003	Anderson Mesa	LONEOS	·	1.3 km	MPC · JPL
287833	2003 SF_{203}	—	September 22, 2003	Anderson Mesa	LONEOS	·	980 m	MPC · JPL
287834	2003 SY_{203}	—	September 22, 2003	Anderson Mesa	LONEOS	MAS	810 m	MPC · JPL
287835	2003 SP_{204}	—	September 22, 2003	Socorro	LINEAR	·	1.3 km	MPC · JPL
287836	2003 SL_{208}	—	September 23, 2003	Palomar	NEAT	HYG	3.5 km	MPC · JPL
287837	2003 SY_{209}	—	September 25, 2003	Haleakala	NEAT	·	970 m	MPC · JPL
287838	2003 SV_{215}	—	September 24, 2003	Haleakala	NEAT	·	2.5 km	MPC · JPL
287839	2003 SY_{218}	—	September 28, 2003	Junk Bond	Junk Bond	·	5.6 km	MPC · JPL
287840	2003 SD_{219}	—	September 22, 2003	Anderson Mesa	LONEOS	H	570 m	MPC · JPL
287841	2003 SL_{219}	—	September 26, 2003	Socorro	LINEAR	·	1 km	MPC · JPL
287842	2003 SX_{219}	—	September 29, 2003	Wrightwood	J. W. Young	·	4.1 km	MPC · JPL
287843	2003 SO_{226}	—	September 26, 2003	Desert Eagle	W. K. Y. Yeung	·	2.7 km	MPC · JPL
287844	2003 SN_{229}	—	September 27, 2003	Kitt Peak	Spacewatch	·	880 m	MPC · JPL
287845	2003 SC_{231}	—	September 24, 2003	Palomar	NEAT	EOS	4.5 km	MPC · JPL
287846	2003 SD_{231}	—	September 24, 2003	Palomar	NEAT	·	1.0 km	MPC · JPL
287847	2003 SQ_{235}	—	September 25, 2003	Palomar	NEAT	·	2.0 km	MPC · JPL
287848	2003 SQ_{236}	—	September 26, 2003	Socorro	LINEAR	·	1.1 km	MPC · JPL
287849	2003 SY_{237}	—	September 26, 2003	Socorro	LINEAR	NYS	1.3 km	MPC · JPL
287850	2003 SR_{242}	—	September 27, 2003	Kitt Peak	Spacewatch	NYS	1.3 km	MPC · JPL
287851	2003 ST_{242}	—	September 27, 2003	Kitt Peak	Spacewatch	·	1.3 km	MPC · JPL
287852	2003 SD_{244}	—	September 28, 2003	Kitt Peak	Spacewatch	MRX	1.3 km	MPC · JPL
287853	2003 SX_{246}	—	September 26, 2003	Socorro	LINEAR	·	1.7 km	MPC · JPL
287854	2003 SV_{250}	—	September 26, 2003	Socorro	LINEAR	·	4.0 km	MPC · JPL
287855	2003 SA_{252}	—	September 26, 2003	Socorro	LINEAR	·	3.3 km	MPC · JPL
287856	2003 SQ_{254}	—	September 27, 2003	Kitt Peak	Spacewatch	·	1.0 km	MPC · JPL
287857	2003 SW_{255}	—	September 27, 2003	Kitt Peak	Spacewatch	V	940 m	MPC · JPL
287858	2003 SW_{256}	—	September 28, 2003	Kitt Peak	Spacewatch	·	1.4 km	MPC · JPL
287859	2003 SJ_{260}	—	September 27, 2003	Socorro	LINEAR	HYG	3.6 km	MPC · JPL
287860	2003 SA_{263}	—	September 28, 2003	Socorro	LINEAR	·	960 m	MPC · JPL
287861	2003 SC_{266}	—	September 29, 2003	Socorro	LINEAR	·	3.5 km	MPC · JPL
287862	2003 SW_{274}	—	September 28, 2003	Kitt Peak	Spacewatch	·	1.1 km	MPC · JPL
287863	2003 SM_{275}	—	September 29, 2003	Socorro	LINEAR	·	2.7 km	MPC · JPL
287864	2003 SA_{278}	—	September 30, 2003	Socorro	LINEAR	MAR	1.6 km	MPC · JPL
287865	2003 SK_{284}	—	September 20, 2003	Socorro	LINEAR	EUN	1.2 km	MPC · JPL
287866	2003 SK_{289}	—	September 28, 2003	Socorro	LINEAR	(21885)	4.5 km	MPC · JPL
287867	2003 SV_{292}	—	September 26, 2003	Črni Vrh	S. Matičič, J. Skvarč	·	1.3 km	MPC · JPL
287868	2003 SE_{294}	—	September 28, 2003	Socorro	LINEAR	·	1.2 km	MPC · JPL
287869	2003 SF_{295}	—	September 29, 2003	Anderson Mesa	LONEOS	·	1.8 km	MPC · JPL
287870	2003 SG_{302}	—	September 17, 2003	Palomar	NEAT	·	5.3 km	MPC · JPL
287871	2003 SN_{303}	—	September 17, 2003	Palomar	NEAT	·	1.5 km	MPC · JPL
287872	2003 SE_{305}	—	September 17, 2003	Palomar	NEAT	GEF	1.9 km	MPC · JPL
287873	2003 ST_{305}	—	September 30, 2003	Socorro	LINEAR	MAR	980 m	MPC · JPL
287874	2003 SZ_{305}	—	September 30, 2003	Socorro	LINEAR	·	840 m	MPC · JPL
287875 Pavlokorsun	2003 SV_{313}	Pavlokorsun	September 29, 2003	Andrushivka	Andrushivka	EOS	2.9 km	MPC · JPL
287876	2003 SC_{315}	—	September 19, 2003	Palomar	NEAT	HNS	2.0 km	MPC · JPL
287877	2003 SJ_{318}	—	September 16, 2003	Kitt Peak	Spacewatch	·	3.1 km	MPC · JPL
287878	2003 SL_{318}	—	September 17, 2003	Kitt Peak	Spacewatch	·	1.6 km	MPC · JPL
287879	2003 SU_{319}	—	September 28, 2003	Socorro	LINEAR	·	1.6 km	MPC · JPL
287880	2003 SC_{324}	—	September 16, 2003	Kitt Peak	Spacewatch	MAS	690 m	MPC · JPL
287881	2003 SZ_{324}	—	September 17, 2003	Kitt Peak	Spacewatch	MAR	960 m	MPC · JPL
287882	2003 ST_{325}	—	September 18, 2003	Kitt Peak	Spacewatch	·	880 m	MPC · JPL
287883	2003 SX_{326}	—	September 18, 2003	Kitt Peak	Spacewatch	·	1.1 km	MPC · JPL
287884	2003 SC_{329}	—	September 21, 2003	Kitt Peak	Spacewatch	RAF	1.1 km	MPC · JPL
287885	2003 ST_{329}	—	September 22, 2003	Haleakala	NEAT	·	1.2 km	MPC · JPL
287886	2003 SJ_{330}	—	September 26, 2003	Apache Point	SDSS	·	680 m	MPC · JPL
287887	2003 SQ_{331}	—	September 27, 2003	Kitt Peak	Spacewatch	EOS	3.8 km	MPC · JPL
287888	2003 SO_{333}	—	September 26, 2003	Apache Point	SDSS	·	2.0 km	MPC · JPL
287889	2003 SG_{334}	—	September 22, 2003	Kitt Peak	Spacewatch	MAS	960 m	MPC · JPL
287890	2003 SU_{336}	—	September 27, 2003	Apache Point	SDSS	·	2.9 km	MPC · JPL
287891	2003 SE_{338}	—	September 26, 2003	Apache Point	SDSS	·	920 m	MPC · JPL
287892	2003 SP_{342}	—	September 17, 2003	Kitt Peak	Spacewatch	·	1.9 km	MPC · JPL
287893	2003 SX_{349}	—	September 18, 2003	Kitt Peak	Spacewatch	·	1.6 km	MPC · JPL
287894	2003 SL_{351}	—	September 19, 2003	Palomar	NEAT	·	1.3 km	MPC · JPL
287895	2003 SO_{375}	—	September 26, 2003	Apache Point	SDSS	·	1.9 km	MPC · JPL
287896	2003 SK_{377}	—	September 26, 2003	Apache Point	SDSS	MAS	780 m	MPC · JPL
287897	2003 ST_{382}	—	September 26, 2003	Apache Point	SDSS	·	2.5 km	MPC · JPL
287898	2003 SY_{388}	—	September 26, 2003	Apache Point	SDSS	EOS	2.0 km	MPC · JPL
287899	2003 SL_{401}	—	September 26, 2003	Apache Point	SDSS	·	2.3 km	MPC · JPL
287900	2003 SU_{413}	—	September 28, 2003	Apache Point	SDSS	·	2.5 km	MPC · JPL

== 287901–288000 ==
back to top

Designation			Discovery			Properties		Ref
Permanent	Provisional	Named after	Date	Site	Discoverer(s)	Category	Diam.	Ref
287901	2003 SO_{423}	—	September 28, 2003	Haleakala	NEAT	EUN	1.6 km	MPC · JPL
287902	2003 SQ_{427}	—	September 28, 2003	Apache Point	SDSS	·	3.5 km	MPC · JPL
287903	2003 SX_{428}	—	September 19, 2003	Kitt Peak	Spacewatch	·	1.2 km	MPC · JPL
287904	2003 SO_{430}	—	September 20, 2003	Anderson Mesa	LONEOS	·	780 m	MPC · JPL
287905	2003 SV_{430}	—	September 30, 2003	Kitt Peak	Spacewatch	·	2.6 km	MPC · JPL
287906	2003 SQ_{433}	—	September 30, 2003	Kitt Peak	Spacewatch	·	2.6 km	MPC · JPL
287907	2003 TV_{5}	—	October 3, 2003	Kitt Peak	Spacewatch	·	2.1 km	MPC · JPL
287908	2003 TK_{11}	—	October 14, 2003	Anderson Mesa	LONEOS	·	2.6 km	MPC · JPL
287909	2003 TR_{12}	—	October 14, 2003	Anderson Mesa	LONEOS	V	890 m	MPC · JPL
287910	2003 TY_{19}	—	October 3, 2003	Kitt Peak	Spacewatch	·	1.3 km	MPC · JPL
287911	2003 TZ_{33}	—	October 1, 2003	Kitt Peak	Spacewatch	(883)	900 m	MPC · JPL
287912	2003 TG_{35}	—	October 1, 2003	Kitt Peak	Spacewatch	·	1.7 km	MPC · JPL
287913	2003 TE_{37}	—	October 2, 2003	Kitt Peak	Spacewatch	·	2.8 km	MPC · JPL
287914	2003 TX_{41}	—	October 2, 2003	Kitt Peak	Spacewatch	·	2.0 km	MPC · JPL
287915	2003 TH_{47}	—	October 3, 2003	Kitt Peak	Spacewatch	·	1.6 km	MPC · JPL
287916	2003 TJ_{47}	—	October 3, 2003	Kitt Peak	Spacewatch	V	690 m	MPC · JPL
287917	2003 TH_{48}	—	October 3, 2003	Kitt Peak	Spacewatch	·	3.9 km	MPC · JPL
287918	2003 TY_{49}	—	October 3, 2003	Kitt Peak	Spacewatch	·	2.1 km	MPC · JPL
287919	2003 TP_{56}	—	October 5, 2003	Kitt Peak	Spacewatch	·	1.7 km	MPC · JPL
287920	2003 TP_{58}	—	October 15, 2003	Palomar	NEAT	·	2.7 km	MPC · JPL
287921	2003 UO_{1}	—	October 16, 2003	Palomar	NEAT	·	1.5 km	MPC · JPL
287922	2003 UH_{9}	—	October 18, 2003	Socorro	LINEAR	H	830 m	MPC · JPL
287923	2003 UL_{10}	—	October 18, 2003	Palomar	NEAT	T_{j} (2.98)	3.8 km	MPC · JPL
287924	2003 UZ_{19}	—	October 22, 2003	Socorro	LINEAR	H	640 m	MPC · JPL
287925	2003 UQ_{22}	—	October 22, 2003	Kitt Peak	Spacewatch	(5)	1.4 km	MPC · JPL
287926	2003 UF_{23}	—	October 22, 2003	Kvistaberg	Uppsala-DLR Asteroid Survey	EUN	1.5 km	MPC · JPL
287927	2003 UT_{29}	—	October 21, 2003	Palomar	NEAT	H	700 m	MPC · JPL
287928	2003 UR_{30}	—	October 16, 2003	Palomar	NEAT	WIT	1.1 km	MPC · JPL
287929	2003 UA_{31}	—	October 16, 2003	Kitt Peak	Spacewatch	·	2.1 km	MPC · JPL
287930	2003 UG_{36}	—	October 16, 2003	Palomar	NEAT	MAR	1.8 km	MPC · JPL
287931	2003 UM_{39}	—	October 16, 2003	Kitt Peak	Spacewatch	·	3.4 km	MPC · JPL
287932	2003 UO_{41}	—	October 17, 2003	Kitt Peak	Spacewatch	NYS	1.5 km	MPC · JPL
287933	2003 UB_{46}	—	October 18, 2003	Kitt Peak	Spacewatch	·	750 m	MPC · JPL
287934	2003 UA_{50}	—	October 16, 2003	Haleakala	NEAT	T_{j} (2.93)	5.4 km	MPC · JPL
287935	2003 UE_{53}	—	October 18, 2003	Palomar	NEAT	·	2.0 km	MPC · JPL
287936	2003 UP_{56}	—	October 22, 2003	Kitt Peak	Spacewatch	LIX	5.0 km	MPC · JPL
287937	2003 UX_{58}	—	October 16, 2003	Kitt Peak	Spacewatch	WIT	1.4 km	MPC · JPL
287938	2003 UR_{61}	—	October 16, 2003	Anderson Mesa	LONEOS	·	800 m	MPC · JPL
287939	2003 UM_{70}	—	October 18, 2003	Kitt Peak	Spacewatch	·	3.2 km	MPC · JPL
287940	2003 UT_{70}	—	October 18, 2003	Kitt Peak	Spacewatch	·	1.9 km	MPC · JPL
287941	2003 UM_{72}	—	October 19, 2003	Kitt Peak	Spacewatch	·	900 m	MPC · JPL
287942	2003 UV_{73}	—	October 27, 2003	Socorro	LINEAR	H	750 m	MPC · JPL
287943	2003 UA_{74}	—	October 16, 2003	Palomar	NEAT	·	1.9 km	MPC · JPL
287944	2003 US_{78}	—	October 18, 2003	Kitt Peak	Spacewatch	·	1.2 km	MPC · JPL
287945	2003 UJ_{84}	—	October 18, 2003	Kitt Peak	Spacewatch	HOF	3.0 km	MPC · JPL
287946	2003 US_{86}	—	October 18, 2003	Palomar	NEAT	·	2.7 km	MPC · JPL
287947	2003 UH_{91}	—	October 20, 2003	Socorro	LINEAR	·	2.2 km	MPC · JPL
287948	2003 UN_{91}	—	October 20, 2003	Socorro	LINEAR	·	2.3 km	MPC · JPL
287949	2003 UO_{91}	—	October 20, 2003	Kitt Peak	Spacewatch	·	3.9 km	MPC · JPL
287950	2003 UG_{93}	—	October 17, 2003	Anderson Mesa	LONEOS	·	5.6 km	MPC · JPL
287951	2003 UY_{94}	—	October 18, 2003	Kitt Peak	Spacewatch	·	1.1 km	MPC · JPL
287952	2003 UK_{97}	—	October 19, 2003	Kitt Peak	Spacewatch	·	2.7 km	MPC · JPL
287953	2003 UR_{98}	—	October 19, 2003	Anderson Mesa	LONEOS	·	1.4 km	MPC · JPL
287954	2003 UJ_{103}	—	October 20, 2003	Kitt Peak	Spacewatch	·	1.7 km	MPC · JPL
287955	2003 UM_{103}	—	October 20, 2003	Palomar	NEAT	·	3.0 km	MPC · JPL
287956	2003 UP_{104}	—	October 18, 2003	Kitt Peak	Spacewatch	·	1.1 km	MPC · JPL
287957	2003 UF_{105}	—	October 18, 2003	Palomar	NEAT	·	3.5 km	MPC · JPL
287958	2003 UT_{109}	—	October 19, 2003	Palomar	NEAT	·	2.4 km	MPC · JPL
287959	2003 UC_{111}	—	October 19, 2003	Haleakala	NEAT	MAS	870 m	MPC · JPL
287960	2003 UR_{113}	—	October 20, 2003	Socorro	LINEAR	·	2.0 km	MPC · JPL
287961	2003 UO_{120}	—	October 18, 2003	Kitt Peak	Spacewatch	GEF	1.7 km	MPC · JPL
287962	2003 UZ_{120}	—	October 18, 2003	Kitt Peak	Spacewatch	·	1.4 km	MPC · JPL
287963	2003 UR_{122}	—	October 19, 2003	Palomar	NEAT	·	1.6 km	MPC · JPL
287964	2003 UG_{123}	—	October 19, 2003	Kitt Peak	Spacewatch	NYS	1.1 km	MPC · JPL
287965	2003 UR_{123}	—	October 19, 2003	Kitt Peak	Spacewatch	·	810 m	MPC · JPL
287966	2003 UQ_{126}	—	October 20, 2003	Palomar	NEAT	·	2.5 km	MPC · JPL
287967	2003 UW_{129}	—	October 18, 2003	Palomar	NEAT	·	920 m	MPC · JPL
287968	2003 UC_{131}	—	October 19, 2003	Palomar	NEAT	·	2.1 km	MPC · JPL
287969	2003 UR_{133}	—	October 20, 2003	Socorro	LINEAR	·	1.6 km	MPC · JPL
287970	2003 UR_{135}	—	October 21, 2003	Palomar	NEAT	·	1.9 km	MPC · JPL
287971	2003 US_{140}	—	October 16, 2003	Palomar	NEAT	·	1.7 km	MPC · JPL
287972	2003 UX_{147}	—	October 18, 2003	Palomar	NEAT	·	1.3 km	MPC · JPL
287973	2003 UH_{148}	—	October 19, 2003	Anderson Mesa	LONEOS	·	960 m	MPC · JPL
287974	2003 UQ_{148}	—	October 19, 2003	Kitt Peak	Spacewatch	·	3.4 km	MPC · JPL
287975	2003 UQ_{149}	—	October 20, 2003	Socorro	LINEAR	·	880 m	MPC · JPL
287976	2003 UE_{153}	—	October 21, 2003	Palomar	NEAT	·	1.4 km	MPC · JPL
287977	2003 UA_{159}	—	October 20, 2003	Kitt Peak	Spacewatch	·	1.6 km	MPC · JPL
287978	2003 UF_{159}	—	October 20, 2003	Kitt Peak	Spacewatch	AGN	1.6 km	MPC · JPL
287979	2003 UH_{160}	—	October 21, 2003	Kitt Peak	Spacewatch	·	2.0 km	MPC · JPL
287980	2003 US_{161}	—	October 21, 2003	Socorro	LINEAR	·	850 m	MPC · JPL
287981	2003 UP_{162}	—	October 21, 2003	Socorro	LINEAR	·	880 m	MPC · JPL
287982	2003 UQ_{164}	—	October 21, 2003	Socorro	LINEAR	BRG	2.3 km	MPC · JPL
287983	2003 UQ_{165}	—	October 21, 2003	Kitt Peak	Spacewatch	·	1.7 km	MPC · JPL
287984	2003 UW_{167}	—	October 22, 2003	Socorro	LINEAR	·	950 m	MPC · JPL
287985	2003 UJ_{168}	—	October 22, 2003	Socorro	LINEAR	·	980 m	MPC · JPL
287986	2003 UD_{174}	—	October 21, 2003	Kitt Peak	Spacewatch	·	1.6 km	MPC · JPL
287987	2003 US_{175}	—	October 21, 2003	Palomar	NEAT	·	2.7 km	MPC · JPL
287988	2003 US_{178}	—	October 21, 2003	Palomar	NEAT	HOF	2.7 km	MPC · JPL
287989	2003 UX_{179}	—	October 21, 2003	Socorro	LINEAR	·	1.6 km	MPC · JPL
287990	2003 UL_{180}	—	October 21, 2003	Socorro	LINEAR	·	2.8 km	MPC · JPL
287991	2003 UP_{183}	—	October 21, 2003	Palomar	NEAT	·	1.5 km	MPC · JPL
287992	2003 UT_{183}	—	October 21, 2003	Palomar	NEAT	·	3.1 km	MPC · JPL
287993	2003 UC_{184}	—	October 21, 2003	Palomar	NEAT	·	680 m	MPC · JPL
287994	2003 US_{184}	—	October 21, 2003	Palomar	NEAT	·	800 m	MPC · JPL
287995	2003 UP_{187}	—	October 22, 2003	Socorro	LINEAR	·	3.4 km	MPC · JPL
287996	2003 UC_{190}	—	October 22, 2003	Kitt Peak	Spacewatch	NYS	1.4 km	MPC · JPL
287997	2003 UT_{190}	—	October 23, 2003	Anderson Mesa	LONEOS	·	1.3 km	MPC · JPL
287998	2003 UX_{190}	—	October 23, 2003	Anderson Mesa	LONEOS	·	3.1 km	MPC · JPL
287999	2003 UK_{191}	—	October 23, 2003	Anderson Mesa	LONEOS	·	830 m	MPC · JPL
288000	2003 UW_{191}	—	October 23, 2003	Anderson Mesa	LONEOS	(5)	1.5 km	MPC · JPL

back to top

== See also ==
- Meanings of minor-planet names: 287001–288000
