= Vylok =

Rural locality in Zakarpattia Oblast, Ukraine

Vylok Вилок
- Rural settlement
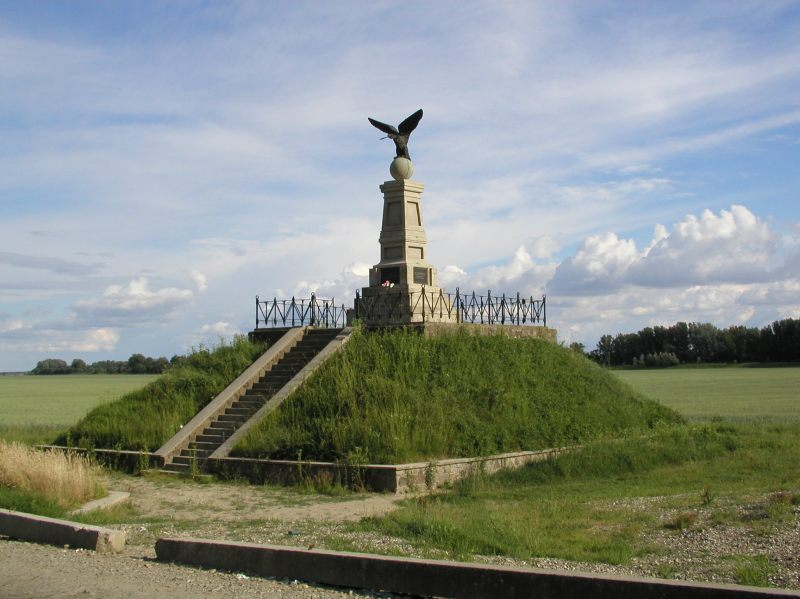

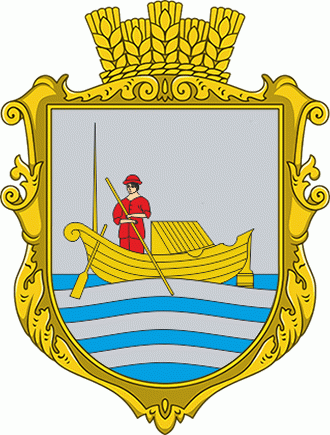
- Coat of arms

- Location of Vylok in Zakarpattia Oblast Location of Vylok in ukraine
- Coordinates: 48°06′53″N 22°49′55″E
- Country: Ukraine
- Oblast: Zakarpattia Oblast
- Raion: Berehove Raion
- Established: 1200
- Town status: 1959

Government
  - Town Head: Yosyp Kilb (József Kilb)
- Elevation: 118 m (387 ft)

Population (2022)
  - Total: ▼3,117
- Time zone: UTC+2 (EET)
  - Summer (DST): UTC+3 (EEST)
- Postal code: 90351
- Area code: +380 3143
- Website: http://rada.gov.ua/

Vylok (Ukrainian: Вилок; Hungarian: Tiszaújlak) (formerly Ukrainian: Уйлок) is a rural settlement in Berehove Raion (district) of Zakarpattia Oblast (region) in western Ukraine. Today, the population is 3,117 (2022 estimate).

The village is located around 15 (by rail) / 16 (by highway) km of Vynohradiv, and 22 km of Berehove along the right bank of the river Tisza.

== History ==
Urban-type settlement since 1959. In 1968, its population was 3.5 thousand people. There was a lumber mill and a shoe factory.

Population was 3,422 as of the 2001 Ukrainian Census. 80% of its population was Hungarian and mayor was Yosyp Kilb (József Kilb).

On 26 January 2024, a new law entered into force which abolished the status of urban-type settlement, and Vylok became a rural settlement.

== Gallery ==
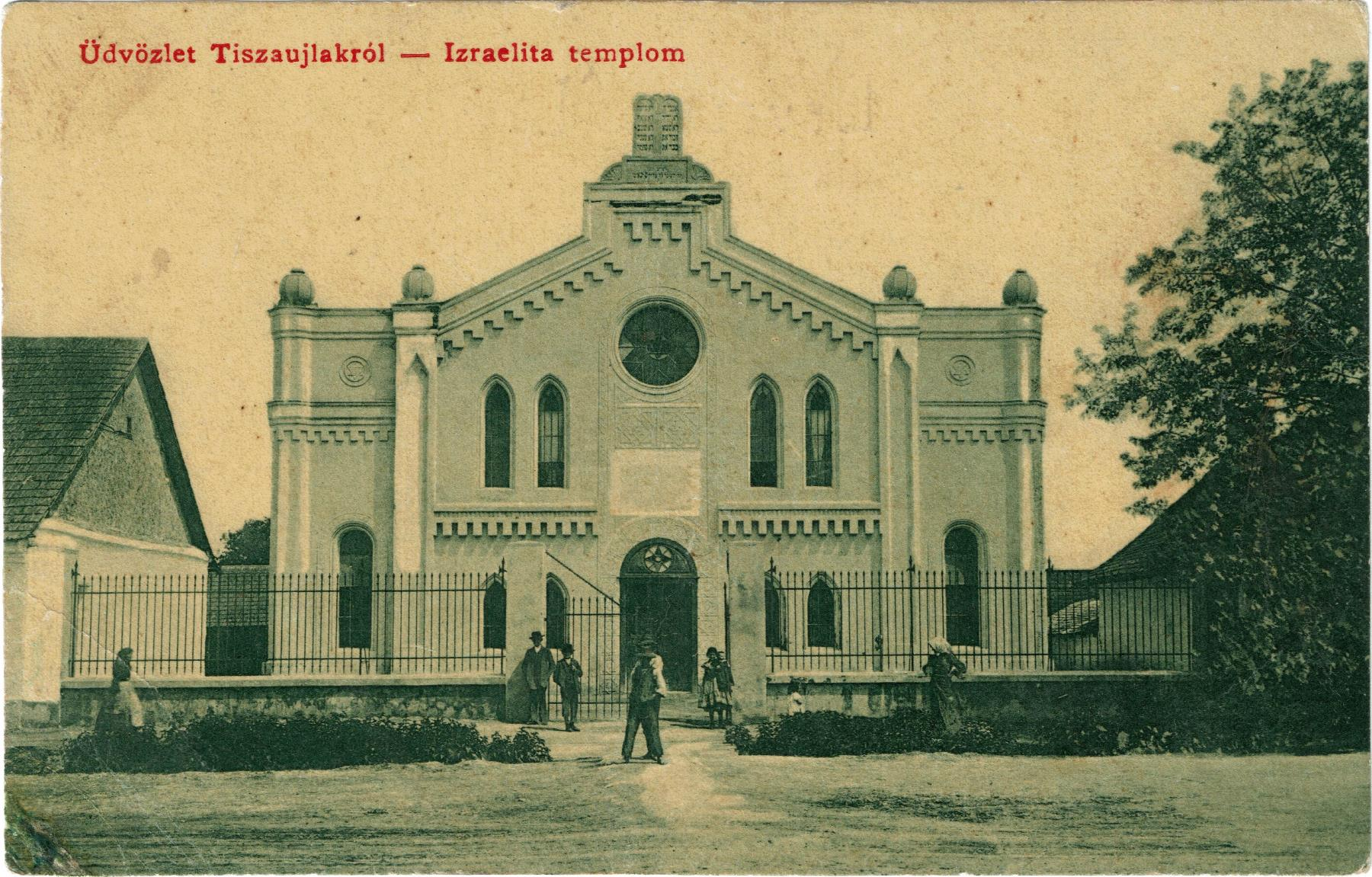
Synagogue

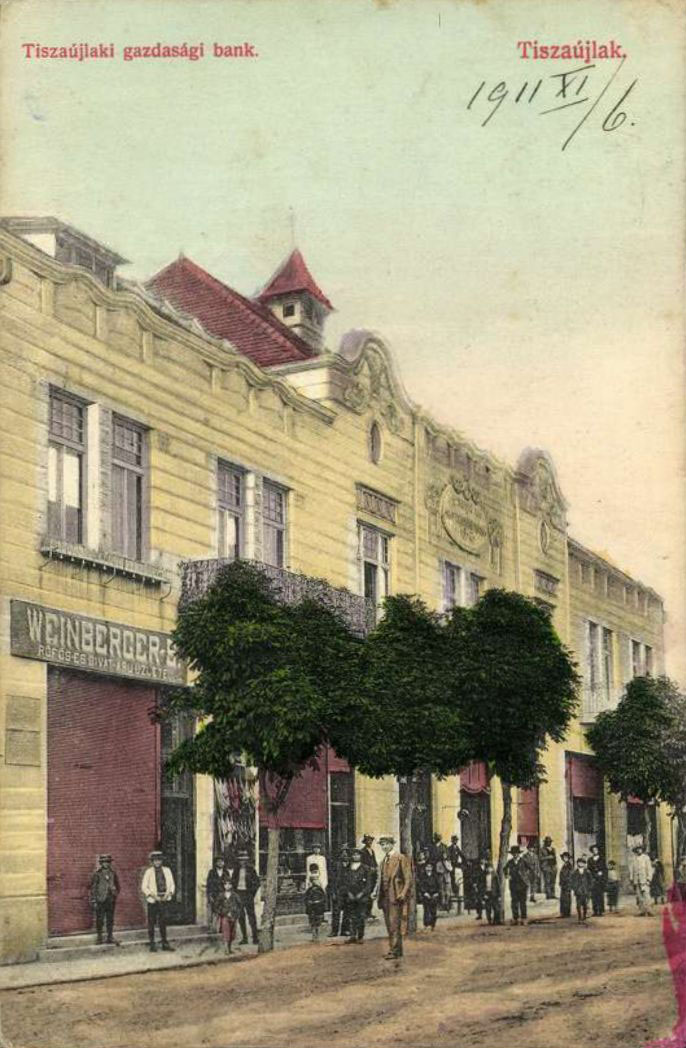
The building of the Tiszaújlak Business Bank in 1911

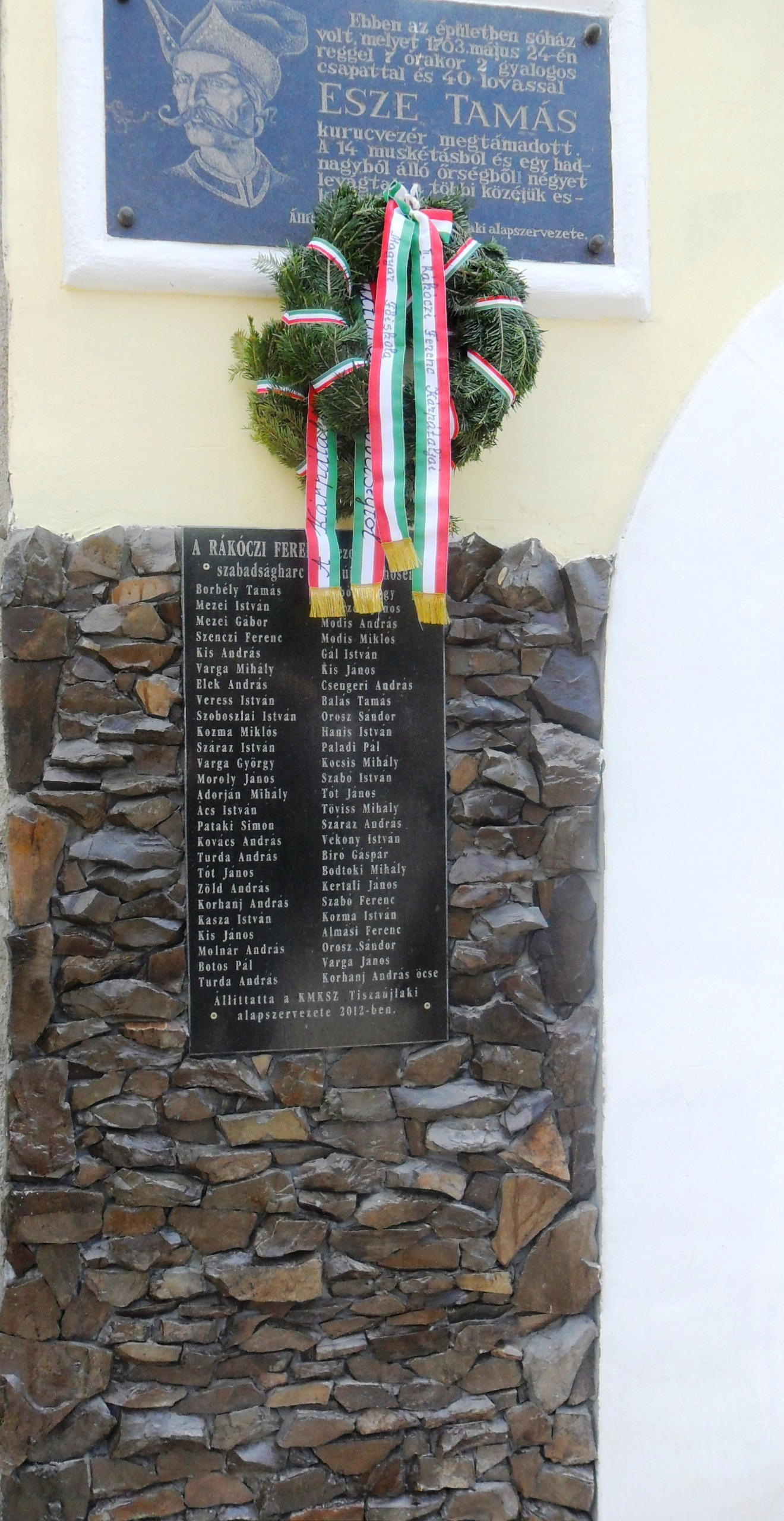
Memorial plaque to the heroes of the 1703-1711 War of Independence led by Ferenc Rákóczi on the wall of the former salt house
