= Lucien Le Foyer =

French lawyer, pacifist and politician

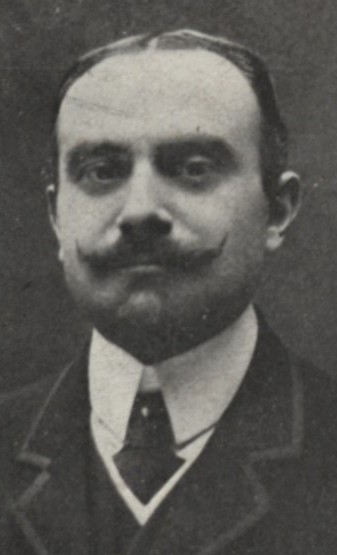
- Lucien Le Foyer in 1909
- Born: 29 June 1872; Paris, France
- Died: 5 October 1952 (aged 80); Saint-Germain-en-Laye, Seine-et-Oise, France
- Occupations: Lawyer, politician

Lucien Le Foyer (29 June 1872 – 5 October 1952) was a French lawyer, pacifist and politician. He played a leading role in French and international pacifist organizations both before the after World War I (1914–18), and after World War II (1939–45). He was also an accomplished poet.

== Pre-war period ==
Lucien Le Foyer was born in Paris on 29 June 1872. He became an advocate at the Paris Court of Appeal.

Starting in 1902 the French pacifist societies began to meet at a National Peace Congress, which often had several hundred attendees. However, they were unable to unify the pacifist forces apart from setting up a small Permanent Delegation of French Pacifist Societies in 1902, led by Charles Richet (1850–1935), with Lucien Le Foyer as secretary-general.

Le Foyer was a member of the Human Rights League (LDH: Ligue des Droits de l’Homme) as were Frédéric Passy, leader of the Société des amis de la Paix and Théodore Ruyssen. The League did not take the strict juridical approach of the Association for Peace through Law, but promoted education about peace, material and moral disarmament, arbitrage between nations, transparency and democratic control of diplomacy. At the 1904 LDH Congress Le Foyer proposed an inalienable right of people to freely dispose of themselves as individuals. He wanted to abolish "collective slavery" and said the voice of the LDH was not just raised for Europe but also for Armenia and Macedonia, both under Turkish control at the time.

On 23 May 1909 Le Foyer was elected deputy for the 2nd district of the 12th arrondissement of Paris in the second round of voting in a by-election. He sat on the left with the radical socialists. He was involved in discussions of the Hague Conference, the General Tariff and the situation of French merchants settled at Lessé on the middle Congo. He ran unsuccessfully for reelection in the general elections on 1910. An enlightened democrat, he enjoyed meeting celebrities of all political views. He remained secretary of the executive committee of the Radical party and secretary-general of the Permanent Delegation of French Pacifist Societies.

On the eve of World War I (1914–18), after the Austrian declaration of war on Serbia, Henri La Fontaine called an emergency meeting in Brussels of leaders of the Bureau international de la paix (BIP) on 31 July 1914. The meeting was attended by about fifty representatives of the national societies of the Netherlands, Britain, Germany, the US, Belgium and France. Lucien Le Foyer was among the French attendees, as were Jeanne Mélin, Théodore Ruyssen, Alfred Vanderpol, Gaston Moch and Émile Arnaud. The attendees agreed to cable the governments calling for restraint. After their meeting they heard that Germany had cut rail lines on its southern border. The next day Belgium began mobilization.

== Post-war ==
At the first meeting of the BIP after the war, the attendees voted for a motion proposed by Théodore Ruyssen that laid the blame for the war on Austria and Germany. Lucien Le Foyer was in the minority, saying the German pacifist should not be blamed. At the first post-war universal congress, in Luxembourg in 1921, the pacifists from the opposing sides were reconciled with some difficulty. Between 1914 and 1935 Le Foyer nominated various colleagues for the Nobel Peace Prize, often several times. These included Léon Bourgeois, Madame Séverine and Charles Richet.

On 16 February 1919 Lucien Le Foyer launched the respectable "Cosmos" lodge of the Freemasons. From 1928 to 1930 he was elected Grand Master of the Grand Lodge of France. Le Foyer was not fully dedicated to pacifism, as were Robert Tourly, Madeleine Vernet and Théodore Ruyssen, but rather a freemason who promoted pacifism within this organization.

Lucien Le Foyer remained interested in politics, and after World War II (1939–45) became president of the executive committee of the National Peace Council (Conseil national de la paix) which called for a pacifist solution to conflicts and an extension of the powers of the Assembly of the Council of Europe. For his poetic works the French Academy awarded the Prix Jules Davaine for Le Foyer's 1950 L'enchantement de l'esprit, and awarded the Prix Amélie Mesureur de Wally for his 1952 Le chant des choses. He died on 5 October 1952 at Saint-Germain-en-Laye, Seine-et-Oise at the age of 80.

== Selected publications ==
- Lucien Le Foyer (1897). Le Minimum de salaire en Belgique, par Lucien Le Foyer. Paris: V. Giard et E. Brière. p. 98.
- Lucien Le Foyer (1899). Lettre à MM. les membres de la Conférence de la paix de La Haye : le droit des peuples. Paris: V. Giard et E. Brière. p. 16.
- Lucien Le Foyer (1896). L'Avenir par le poète, une ébauche d'esthétique, conférence de "l'Art et la vie", faite à la Bodinière, le 5 mars 1896. Paris: impr. de Noizette. p. 12.
- Lucien Le Foyer (1901). La Guerre et la paix par des chiffres. Paris: V. Giard et E. Brière. p. 24.
- Lucien Le Foyer (1902). La Liberté de l'enseignement. Paris: V. Giard et E. Brière. p. 32.
- Lucien Le Foyer (1902). De la Tolérance dans les Universités populaires. Paris: Coopération des idées. p. 62.
- Lucien Le Foyer (1902). Des Conséquences juridiques de la contamination syphilitique. Paris: V. Giard et E. Brière. p. 34.
- Lucien Le Foyer (1903). La Mission morale de la France, conférence de l'Union des instituteurs et institutrices publics de la Seine, faite à la Sorbonne, le 20 décembre 1902. Nîmes, 10, rue Monjardin. p. 47.
- Lucien Le Foyer (1903). Patriotisme et civisme, conférence faite à l'Ecole militaire de Saint-Maixent, le 24 novembre 1902. Nîmes: bureaux de "la Paix par le droit". p. 28.
- Lucien Le Foyer (1904). Conférence de M. Lucien Le Foyer,... donnée au théâtre Kursaal de Lille, le 20 décembre 1903, sous la présidence de M. Debierre... Lille: impr. du "Progrès du Nord". p. 27.
- Adolphe Chéron, Lucien Le Foyer (1909). Préparation militaire de la jeunesse. Paris: Veneziani. p. 64.
- Lucien Le Foyer, Stephen Pichon (1910). L'Union interparlementaire à la Chambre française. Discours de MM. Paul Meunier et Lucien Le Foyer,... réponse de M. Stephen Pichon. Bruxelles: Bureau interparlementaire. p. 47.
- Lucien Le Foyer, Pierre Nattan-Larrier (1913). Rapport présenté à la commission... Paris: Impr. générale des arts. p. 3.
- Lucien Le Foyer (1920). La Défense des persécutés. Paris: Société mutuelle d'édition. p. 305.
- Lucien Le Foyer (1924). Le Suffrage international. Paris, 1 rue Tardieu. p. 31.
- Lucien Le Foyer (1926). Chant des peuples. Le Progrès, paroles et chant de L. Le Foyer.
- Lucien Le Foyer (1938). Commission B : le traité franco-tchécoslovaque. Paris: impr. de A. Montourcy. p. 24.
- Lucien Le Foyer (1948). L'Enchantement de l'esprit. Paris: Éditions de "la Revue moderne". p. 20.
- Lucien Le Foyer (1949). Le Vrai Jésus d'après les Évangiles. Herblay : Éditions de l'Idée libre. p. 64.
- Lucien Le Foyer (1950). Le Charme des choses. Paris: Éditions de la Tour du. p. 206.

== Sources ==
- Cooper, Sandi E. (1991-11-11). Patriotic Pacifism : Waging War on War in Europe, 1815-1914: Waging War on War in Europe, 1815-1914. Oxford University Press, USA. ISBN 978-0-19-536343-2.
- Guieu, Jean-Michel (2005). "6 - Tensions nationalistes et efforts pacifistes". La France, l'Allemagne et l'Europe (1871-1945) (in French).
- Guieu, Jean-Michel (2007). "Les Congrès universels de la paix et la question de l'unité européenne, 1921-1939". For Peace in Europe: Institutions and Civil Society Between the World Wars (in French). Peter Lang. ISBN 978-90-5201-364-0.
- Jolly, Jean (1977). "Lucien Le Foyer". Dictionnaire des parlementaires français de 1889 à 1940. Presses universitaires de France. ISBN 2-1100-1998-0.
- La Documentation Française (1988-12-31). "Lucien Le Foyer". Dictionnaire des parlementaires français de 1940 à 1958 (in French). ISBN 2110019980.
- "Lucien LE FOYER". Académie française.
- "Lucien Le Foyer". Nobelprize.org.
- Naquet, Emmanuel (2013). "Quelques défenseurs des droits de l'Homme face à la cause arménienne (fin xixe - début xxe siècles)". Études arméniennes contemporaines (in French). 2.
- Olivera, Philippe; Offenstadt, Nicolas (1993). "L'engagement pour la paix dans la France de l'entre-deux-guerres : un ou des pacifismes ?". Matériaux pour l'histoire de notre temps. 30 (30 S'engager pour la paix dans la France de l'entre-deux-guerres): 53–56. doi:10.3406/mat.1993.404094.
- "Un ancien Grand Maître de la Grande Loge de France Michel DUMESNIL de GRAMONT". Points de Vue Initiatiques (in French) (33). 1979.

Masonic offices
Preceded by Maurice Monier	Grand Master of the Grande Loge de France; 1928–1930	Succeeded by Maurice Monier
