= Alfred Vanderpol =

French engineer, philanthropist and author

- Born: 7 April 1854; Tourcoing, France
- Died: 17 June 1915 (aged 61); Souzy-L’Argentière, France
- Occupation: Engineer
- Known for: La doctrine scolastique du droit de guerre

Alfred Vanderpol (7 April 1854 – 17 June 1915) was a French engineer, philanthropist and author who was one of the leaders of the pacifist movement in France in the years leading up to World War I (1914–18).

== Early years ==
Alfred Marie Vanderpol was born in Tourcoing, Nord on 7 April 1854, son of François Vanderpol and Anna Knaepffler of Phalsbourg. His father's family was Flemish in origin and his mother's was from Alsace. He had an older sister and a brother who died at an early age. After living in Le Havre for several years the Vanderpols returned to Tourcoing, where on 30 December 1865 the father had been appointed to the customs office. Vanderpol attended secondary school in Tourcoing. During the Franco-Prussian War of 1870 he became interested in the subject of war and peace. He considered applying for the École Polytechnique, and took a specialized mathematics course at the lycée in Lille. On his teacher's advice he then entered the École centrale des Arts et Manufactures in Lille, and graduated in 1876 with a diploma in engineering.

== Career ==
From 1876 to 1877 Vanderpol undertook his year of military service in Versailles, where he served in the Engineers. He then joined the staff of the civil engineer Lombard-Gérin in Lyon. He was charged with construction of one of the first mechanical weaving mills to be established in the Pont-de-Beauvoisin region. In November 1877 the young engineer enrolled in the Faculty of Law of Lyon, where he continued the study of law that he had started while serving in Versailles. He obtained his license in 1880. On 1 November 1880 he became an engineer in the Lyon roads department as assistant to the chief engineer, specializing in bridges, a position he held until the end of July 1884.

On 12 August 1882 Vanderpol married Jeanne-Marie-Claudine Berger of Lyon. They had three sons and two daughters, their last child born in 1894. After leaving the roads department in 1884 he obtained work with a gas meter factory. He then became an associate of Maldant Dupoy, also manufacturers of meters, and founded a branch in Lyon and then another in Italy. He remained an administrative director of the enterprise for the rest of his life, visiting Paris every month. He served as an expert in trials, and became known for the precision of his reports.

== Social work ==
Vanderpol joined the Société des sciences industrielles de Lyon (Society of Industrial Sciences of Lyon) in 1880, and the Société d’agriculture, sciences et arts utiles de Lyon (Society of Agriculture, Science and Practical Arts) in 1883. The two merged in 1894 to become the Société d’agriculture, sciences et industries de Lyon (Society of Agriculture, Science and Industry of Lyon), where he served as secretary. In 1890 he was a member of the Société pour le sauvetage des enfants moralement abandonnés (Society for Rescue of Morally Abandoned Children.) He organized and directed the temporary asylum in Vaise. He also worked for the Association catholique lyonnaise pour la diffusion des évangiles (Lyon Catholic Association for diffusion of the Gospel) and the St. Jerome Society.

In 1900 Vanderpol became paralyzed in his lower limbs. In 1905 he was a member of Le Sillon ("The Furrow", or "The Path") of Marc Sangnier in Lyon. Some sources say he had co-founded the group with Victor Carlhian. Vanderpol and Carlhian supported the journal Demain from the time of its foundation.

== Pacifist ==
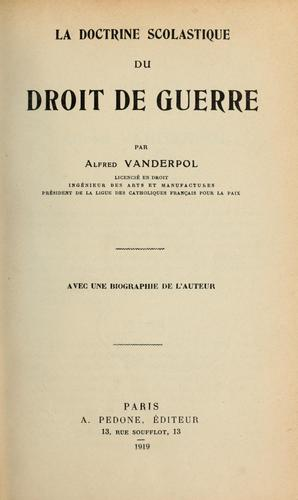

In 1906 Vanderpol attended the Pacifist Congress in Milan, and from this time worked to convince Catholic circles of the importance of the fight for peace. He hoped that Pope Pius X would publish an encyclical on international justice and peace as forceful as the Rerum novarum of Pope Leo XIII on social action and working conditions. In 1907 Vanderpol and the Abbé Pichot founded the Société Gratry, named after the priest and professor at the Sorbonne who had adhered to the International Peace League in 1867. In 1909 the Société Gratry became the Ligue des catholiques français pour la paix (League of French Catholics for Peace). Vanderpol was general secretary and editor of the Bulletin of the league, and Bishop Beaupin was president.

From 1906 to 1913 Vanderpol toured France giving lectures on peace. He tried to mobilize Catholics in favor of universal peace, himself taking "a position equidistant from extreme militarism and utopian pacifism." In 1911 he participated at the Congress of French Peace Societies at Clermont-Ferrand, where he spoke on academic theory of the law of war. In 1912 he assisted in creation of the International Union for the law of nations based on Christian principles, with a training institute based at the University of Leuven.

On the eve of World War I (1914–18), after the Austrian declaration of war on Serbia, Henri La Fontaine called an emergency meeting in Brussels of leaders of the Bureau international de la paix (BIP) on 31 July 1914. The meeting was attended by about fifty representatives of the national societies of the Netherlands, Britain, Germany, the US, Belgium and France. The French attendees included Lucien Le Foyer, Jeanne Mélin, Théodore Ruyssen, Alfred Vanderpol, Gaston Moch and Émile Arnaud. The attendees agreed to cable the governments calling for restraint. After they meeting they heard that Germany had cut rail lines on its southern border. The next day Belgium began mobilization.

After the outbreak of war in 1914 Vanderpol organized assistance for the wounded in the premises of the Society for Rescue of Morally Abandoned Children. His son died during the war, which in his view showed that his work had failed. Vanderpol died in Souzy-L’Argentière in June 1915. A square in Vaise, near Saint Peter's Church and the asylum, has born his name since 1955, with a plaque to "Alfred Vanderpol, an apostle of peace."

== Publications ==
Vanderpol's works include

- 1911, Le Droit de guerre d’après les théologiens et les canonistes du Moyen-Age, preface by Abbé Tanquerey
- 1912, La Guerre devant le christianisme, suivi d’une traduction du « De Jure Belli » de François de Victoria
- 1913, L’Eglise et la guerre, où VANDERPOL rassemble les études de huit auteurs
- 1914, Guerre injuste, review
- 1919, La doctrine scolastique du droit de guerre

== See also ==
- List of peace activists

== Sources ==
- "Alfred Vanderpol". Musée du Diocese de Lyon.
- Bodet, M. (1921). "Alfred Vanderpol. La doctrine scolastique du droit de guerre". Revue d'histoire de l'Église de France. lien (34).
- Chénon, Émile (1919). "Préface Alfred VANDERPOL". La doctrine scolastique du droit de guerre (in French). Paris: A. Pedone. OL 6678717M.
- Cooper, Sandi E. (1991-11-11). Patriotic Pacifism : Waging War on War in Europe, 1815-1914: Waging War on War in Europe, 1815-1914. Oxford University Press, USA. ISBN 978-0-19-536343-2.
