= Auguste Marie Fabre =

French industrialist (1839-1922)

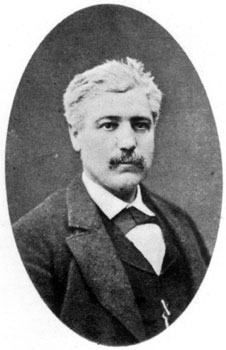
- Born: 5 February 1839; Uzès, Gard, France
- Died: 26 December 1922 (aged 83); Geneva, Switzerland
- Occupations: Manufacturer, mechanic
- Known for: Cooperative movement

Auguste Marie Fabre (5 February 1839 – 26 December 1922) was a French industrialist. He had utopian ideas and was involved in various cooperative experiments. He was the author of the 1896 booklet Les Sky Scratchers in which he extolled modern technological developments.

== Early years ==
Auguste Marie Fabre was born in Uzès, Gard on 5 February 1839. He was the son of a preacher and Fourierist. His parents died when he was young, and he was brought up by a foster family near Nîmes. He became an admirer of Charles Fourier from reading the books from his father's library. Fabre inherited a silk factory in Uzès, which he reopened. In the late 1860s he subscribed to the Fourierist journal La Science sociale. He began to correspond with Jean-Baptiste André Godin, founder of the Familistère de Guise, from 1868. He was enthusiastic about America, which he planned to visit, but the Franco-Prussian War of 1870 prevented the trip.

== Cooperative movement ==
Fabre realized that his company, like the other silk factories in the Uzès region, could not fight competition from Lyon. He closed the factory and moved to Nîmes in the early 1870s where he worked as a mechanic in a farm equipment factory. Fabre established a workers club in 1876 called La Solidarité, with about fifteen members. They met and discussed social issues, and the better educated taught the others to read and write. In 1878 he founded a workers' consumers cooperative, also called La Solidarité, with about thirty members. He also opened La Renaissance, a cooperative bakery.

In 1879 Fabre was asked by Godin to help administer the Fourierist cooperative Familistère (Social Palace) in Guise. He probably reach Guise in the summer of 1880 and left after March 1881, but remained in contact with the Familistère afterwards. After returning to Nîmes he devoted most of his energy to the cooperative movement. He worked with Éduard de Boyve, founder of the Abeille Nîmoise cooperative in 1884, and with the economist Charles Gide (1847–1932). These three Protestant men founded the French cooperative movement that came to be called the École de Nîmes. The Sociétés Coopératives de Consommation de France held its first national congress in Paris on 27 July 1885. The journal l'Émancipation was launched at this meeting, and first appeared on 15 November 1886 in Nîmes. Gide, de Boyve and Fabre all contributed to the journal.

Fabre supported public education, and was one of the founders of the Société du Sou des Ecoles laïques. He advocated the organization of evening art classes for young workers. A friend of Numa Gilly, the socialist mayor of Nîmes in the late 1880s, he obtained the creation of a Practical School of Industry and Commerce, and was on the board of this institution until his death. He also supported the pacifist and feminist movements. The precursor of the Peace Through Law Association was founded in Nîmes on 7 April 1887 by six students led by Théodore Eugène César Ruyssen (1868–1967). At first it was named the Association of Young Friends of Peace (Association des jeunes amis de la paix). It was Protestant in nature, influenced by utopian socialism and by the cooperative school of Nîmes. Fabre was particularly influential on the young peace activists.

Fabre was secretary of the Chambre consultative des coopératives de consommation pour l’Hérault et le Gard. In 1889 he was appointed to the central committee of the Union coopérative des sociétés de consommation, holding this post until 1912. In his 1896 pamphlet Les Sky scratchers Fabre praised American-style skyscrapers, which he saw as the solution to the problem of housing workers. They were practical, hygienic, safe and easily subdivided. At the end of 1897 he was designated to help prepare for the cooperative exhibition at the Exposition Universelle (1900). In 1901 Fabre began to collect photographs of cooperative institutions that could be projected to support lectures. He used these materials for talks that he gave in the 1900s.

In his last years Fabre left the cooperative movement and devoted much of his time to psychic questions and spiritualism. Auguste Marie Fabre died on 26 December 1922 in the home of his son-in-law in Geneva, Switzerland.

== Publications ==
Fabre's publications include:

- Auguste Fabre. Deux épisodes de la vie de Robert Owen.
- Auguste Fabre. La Coopération dans les Iles Britanniques.
- Auguste Fabre. La Société coopérative suisse de consommation à Genève, quelques mots sur les origines de la société.
- Auguste Fabre. Les "Trusts" et les "industrial combinations.
- Auguste Fabre (1896). La Concurrence asiatique et l'avenir des ouvriers européens.
- Auguste Fabre (1896). Les Sky scratchers, ou les Hautes maisons américaines.
- Auguste Fabre (1896). Robert Owen: on socialiste pratique. Nimes.
- Auguste Fabre (1897). Le Féminisme, ses origines et son avenir. Bureaux de l'émancipation.
- Auguste Fabre. Luxation de l'avant-bras en arrière.
- Auguste Fabre. Moralités quotidiennes.

== Sources ==
- Ceadel, Martin (2000). Semi-detached Idealists: The British Peace Movement and International Relations, 1854-1945. Oxford University Press. ISBN 978-0-19-924117-0.
- Desmars, Bernard (2014). "Fabre, Auguste (Marie)". Association d'études fouriéristes.
- Guieu, Jean-Michel (2005). "6 - Tensions nationalistes et efforts pacifistes". La France, l'Allemagne et l'Europe (1871-1945) (in French).
- Sanders, Huub (2002-08-01). "Les Sky Scratchers: Background". International Institute of Social History.
- Sanders, Huub (2002b). "Auguste Fabre - Les Sky Scratchers". International Institute of Social History.
