= Michel Chartier =

French priest and journalist (1912–2006)

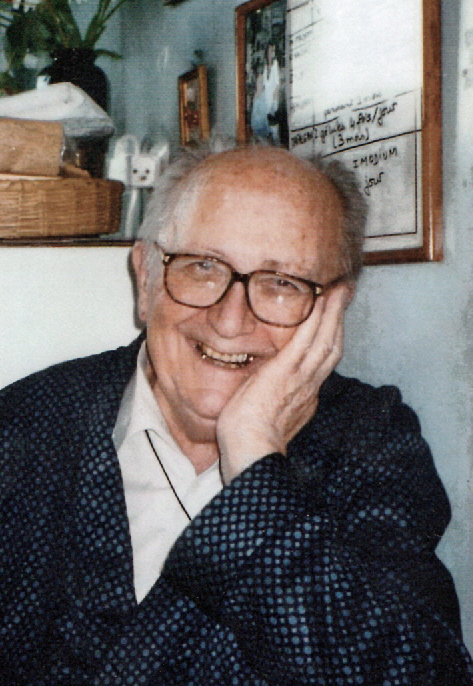
Image of Père Chartier

Michel Chartier (February 26, 1912 – July 11, 2006) is a French priest and journalist.

== Biography ==
In the 1930s, he was vicar in Givors . During the Second World War, he was captured in a stalag. Secretary of the priest Joseph Folliet to the Chronique sociale (Lyon), Fidei donum priest of the Roman Catholic Archdiocese of Lyon in Senegal (late 1950s, early 1960s) and head in Dakar of the catholic journals Afrique Documents and La Semaine africaine, before being editor-in-chief of Peuples du Monde and become librarian of the Pontifical Mission Societies in Lyon. Michel Chartier was one of the outstanding figures of social Catholicism in Lyon of the second half of the 20th century. Besides hundreds of articles and book reviews, he has published, with the economist Gilbert Blardone, the priest Joseph Folliet and the abbot Henri Vial, the book "Initiation économique et sociale" (Editions of the Chronique Sociale, 1956). He is buried in the municipal cemetery of Boyer.
