= Pacifism in France =

Anti-war political movement

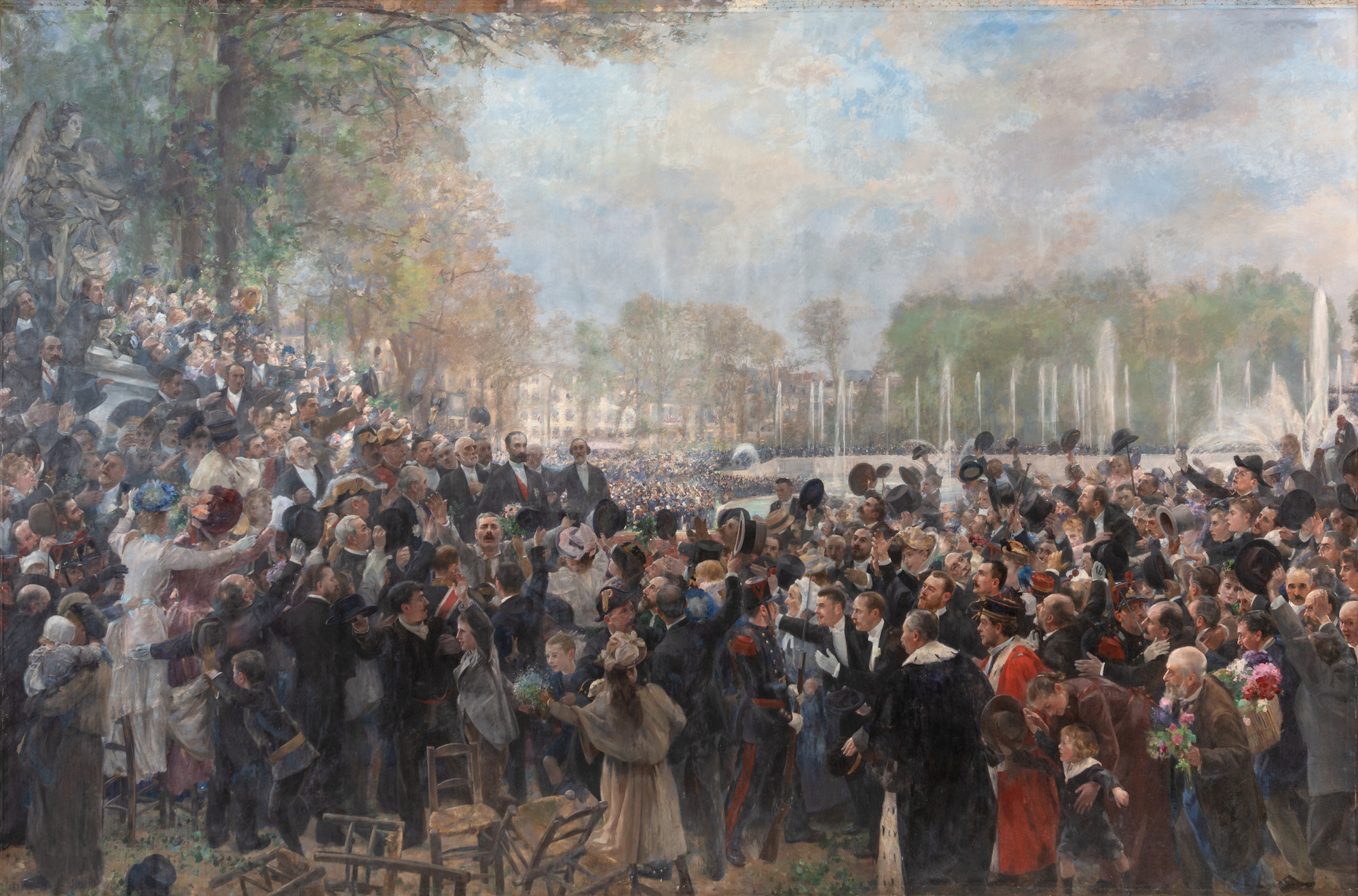
Pacifism became prominent during the 1889 centennial of the French Revolution, when two meetings were held.

Pacifism in France refers to pacifism, the opposition to war or violence, in France. French pacifism encompasses several historic and modern political movements, generally those that advocate against war and nuclear testing. The French pacifist movement first became prominent in 1889, and it grew in influence throughout the 20th century, although it was slightly hampered by the invasion of France during the Second World War. France is a founding member of the Inter-Parliamentary Union, which has 178 members and was founded in 1889. France is a member state of several organisations with stated pacifist goals, such as the United Nations, of which it is a founding nation, along with 51 other states. France is also home to several explicitly pacifist movements, such as the Mouvement de la Paix. However, pacifist organisations have faced a mixed reception. The French government has endorsed some movements, while suppressing others, with one of the most notable instances being the 1955 bombing of the ship Rainbow Warrior, operated by the organisation Greenpeace. The most prominent active organisations in France include Greenpeace and Pax Christi.

National service, or as it is called in France, service national universel, was abolished in the 1990s. The option of government service was made available for pacifists by the national service in the 1960s, under the presidency of Charles de Gaulle, after a hunger strike by Louis Lecoin, in continuation of the campaign he started in 1958. Organisations such as Amnesty International have criticised the French government for obfuscating the procedure through which pacifists can enroll in non-military national service. In 2025, the French government announced that it would begin voluntary military service by mid-2026. People have been able to apply since January 2026.

In 2026, France ranked 99th out of 163 on the annual Global Peace Index; in 2007, it ranked 34th. (Note: The Global Peace Index is released every June by Economics and Peace.) This was due to increasing levels of violence, with one in ten people reporting having been victim of a violent crime.

== History ==
=== Pre-1914 ===
Pacifism can be traced to early Christianity and its tenets of non-violence. (Note: For example, Matthew 39: But I tell you, do not resist an evil person. If anyone slaps you on the right cheek, turn to them the other cheek also.) For many early Christians, service to the state or the military was seen as unacceptable. Some have argued that oath(s) of allegiance were a particular point of contention. This can be demonstrated through the case of the Quakers, who in February 1791 began to petition the government for an exemption to military service and the taking of civic oaths.

The Quaker movement in France had its first meeting in 1785, with formal affiliation, centred in Congénies, being achieved between the English Quakers and the French Quakers in 1789. Significant figures, such as Voltaire, supported the Quaker movement, and, in a set of letters in 1734, called them "noble". While some authors, such as Matt Phillpott, write that before the British affiliation, French Quakers did not focus on "the military question", the Quakers are typically understood as a pacifist movement. As soon as the French Revolution of 1789 occurred, the French Quakers began to try and secure the same military exemption that they had held before the revolution. The Quakers believed they would be able to achieve this exemption due to Article 10 in the Declaration of the Rights of Man and of the Citizen, which stated: "No one may be disturbed on account of his opinions, even religious ones, as long as the manifestation of such opinions does not interfere with the established Law and Order". Gabriel Riqueti (or Mirabeau) responded to the petition by arguing that wars of offence were wrong, whilst wars of defence were the duty of citizens for a plethora of reasons, such as it being necessary for a peaceful state as well as a religious duty. Furthermore, legally, the "by law" exception in the clause allowed the government to say that by law, the Quakers were supposed to join the military as well as having to swear oaths. As a result, the Quakers ended up having to swear both oaths and fight in the French military.

Anti authoritarian thought was rife in Europe during the 1850s and 1860s, due to conferences such as the Congress on Artistic and Literary property, which took place in Brussels in 1858 and in Antwerp in 1861, and the International Student Congress in Liege in 1865. One of the early examples of pacifism was in 1866, in which Napoleon III stated that he had the intention of annexing Luxembourg, but, both internal and external public opinion was against this war. A manifesto calling a congress was released in June 1867, and it would meet in Geneva in the beginning of September as the League of Peace and Freedom, with a programme issued in July. The goal of the congress was to "determine the political and economic conditions of peace among the nations, and in particular to establish the United States of Europe". (Note: The League of Peace and Freedom should not be confused with the League of Nations.) There were close to 10,000 attendees at the conference, including the French philosopher and writer Edgar Quinet. Some French delegates, such as Paul Dupont, argued that peace was a result of certain circumstances and that for it to be achieved, it was needed for all citizens to be in a class of workers. This was in line with the proposal of Giuseppe Garibaldi's proposal during the summit. Some at the conference argued that the concept of nationality should be abolished. The peace summit was not without problems, with the Marx ally Sigismud Ludwig Borkheim advocating for war on Russia in order to secure European peace.

The pacifist movement in France began to gain traction during the 1889 centennial celebration of the French Revolution. During the event, there were two conferences, with 92 members of parliament from nine different countries. In the first meeting, co-chaired by the English M.P William Randal Cremer, the Inter-Parliamentary Union was founded, which today encompasses 178 states. This was the first of 21 Universal Peace congresses that occurred prior to 1914.

The term pacifism was coined by the French peace campaigner Émile Arnaud and adopted by other peace activists at the tenth Universal Peace Congress, held in Glasgow in 1901. During the event, a resolution was passed, stating that the congress desired that persistent efforts be made for people to follow "the great moral law" and become anti-war and anti-militarist.

The French peace movement rapidly expanded, and by 1913, it included 28 different peace organisations. In the view of Roger Chickering, the rise of these organisations can be attributed to the Dreyfus affair.

The French socialist leader and pacifist Jean Jaurès was assassinated by a nationalist just before the beginning of the First World War. He was a French member of parliament and had campaigned to stop the war from happening.

=== During the First World War ===
Many pacifists, such as Quakers, became medics and non-combatants during the First World War. In France, there was compulsory military service between 20 and 23, and people were reservists until they were 30. Until 45, French men could be territorials. As conscientious objection was illegal, many pacifists were forced to join the army.

=== Interwar period ===
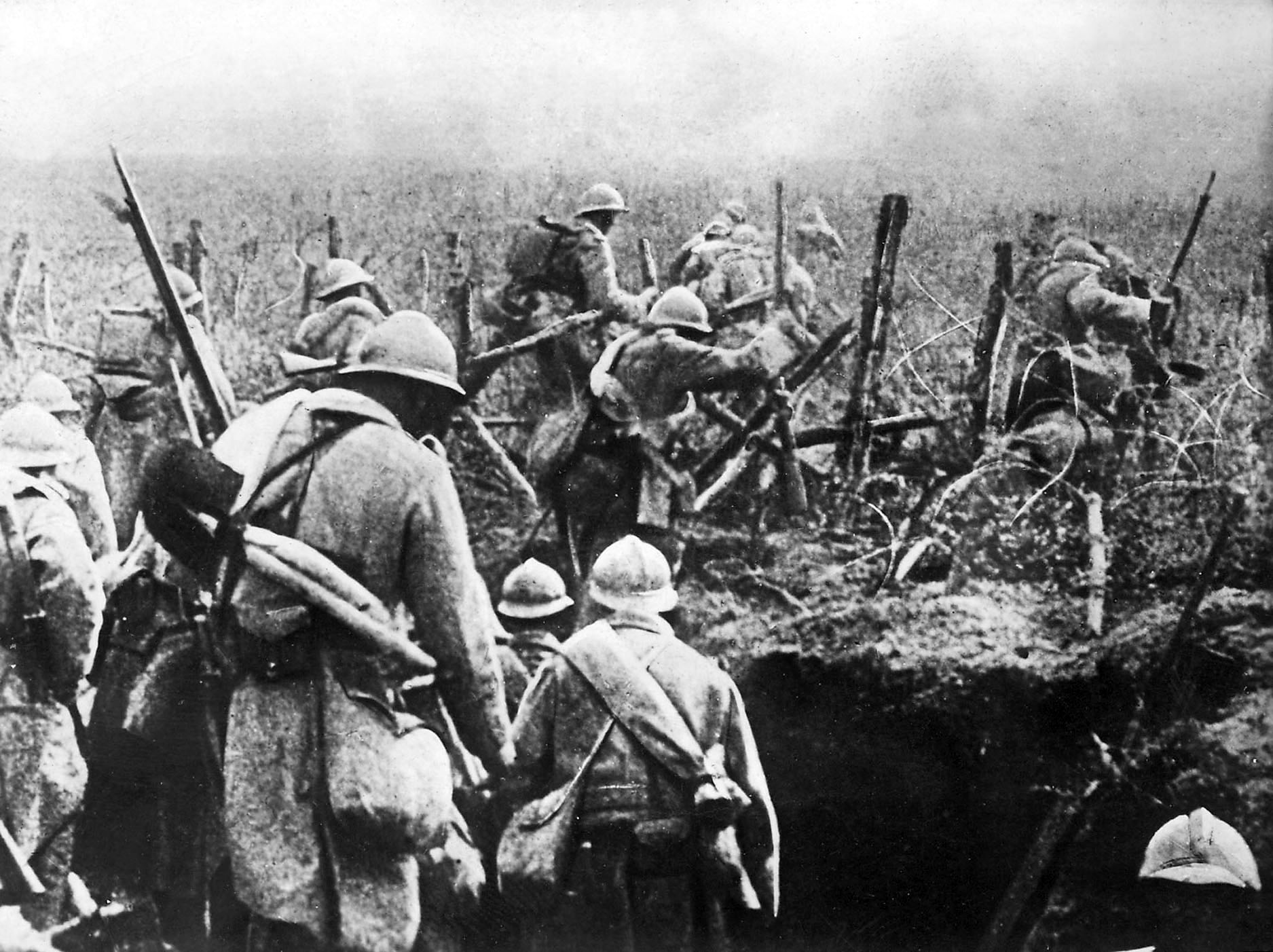
French soldiers leaving their trench during the Battle of Verdun, 1916. Over 63,000 people died, and 216,000 were injured on the French side.

After the First World War, pacifism became a bipartisan movement. The French economist Jacques Fontanel has argued that this led to disarmament in France, which subsequently yielded appeasement with Germany without rearmament. The most significant process in appeasement was the Munich Agreement, which allowed Germany to take over the Sudetenland in Czechoslovakia, under the pretext that the region's inhabitants were German speakers. Many public figures in Czechoslovakia felt that they had been betrayed, first by France, then by Britain. The Munich Agreement also greatly damaged Czechoslovakia's defences, as the bulk of them were in the Sudetenland.

Veterans comprised a significant section of French society, accounting for 5.85 million people, or 45% of the male population, in 1930. According to Antoine Prost, one in six Frenchmen belonged to a veterans' movement in the 1920s. Furthermore, one in four families had experienced a casualty as a direct result of the First World War. The writer and activist Émilie Carles described her idealogical conversion to pacifism in her book A Life of Her Own: The Transformation of a Countrywoman in Twentieth-Century France, after her brother returned from the Western Front in 1916.

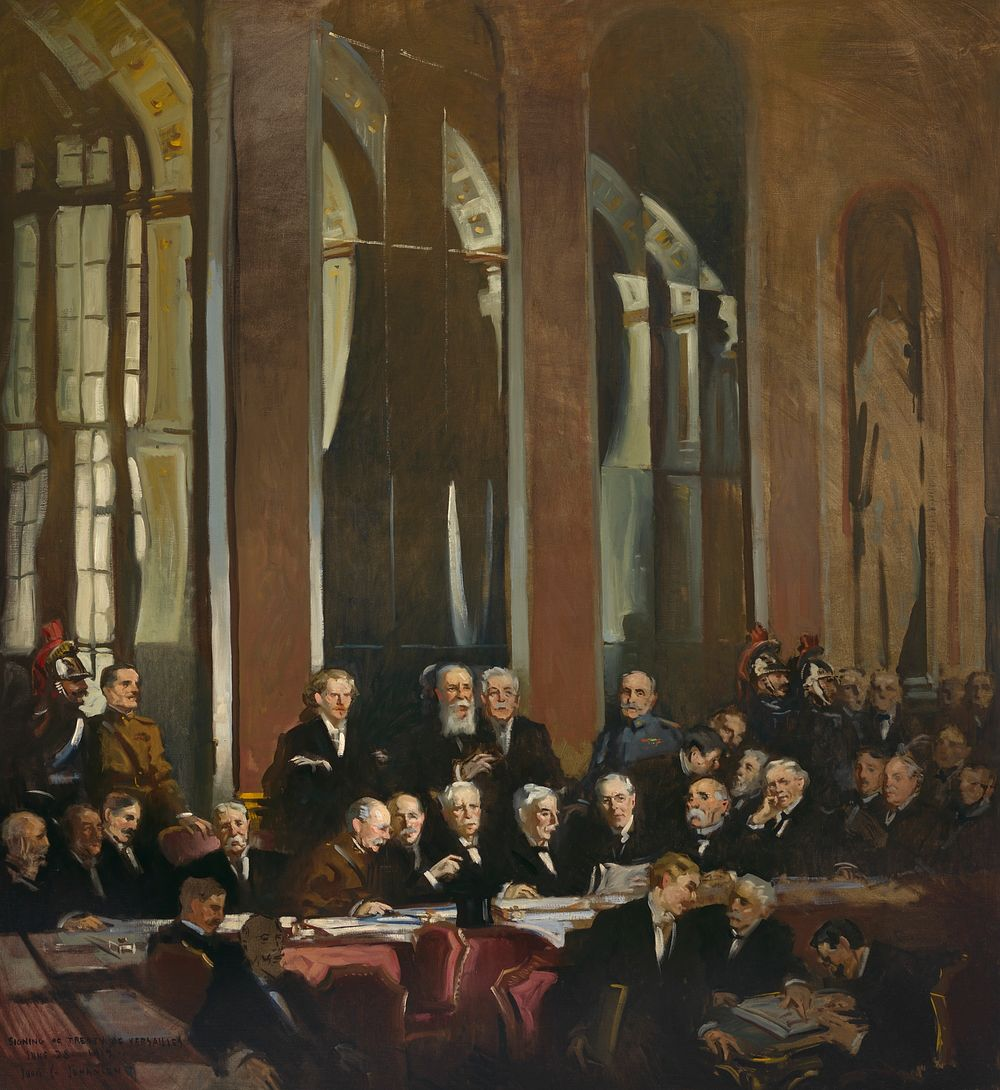
The Treaty of Versailles was signed on 28 June 1919.

Although intellectuals had supported France during the First World War, during the interwar period, they were the driving force behind pacifism. In 1925, a petition for the revision of the Treaty of Versailles collected the signatures of over 100 French personalities.

Prior to the First World War, the police had focused on suppressing pacifist sentiment in the Parisian intelligentsia. By the end of the First World War, the appeal of pacifism had spread to farmers and workers, far removed from the "high society" that the police frequently monitored.

During the post-war period, French intellectuals played a significant role in pacifism. It appeared in literature, cinema, and music. The writer Romain Rolland published the "Déclaration de l'indépendance de l'Esprit" in the newspaper L'Humanité in 1919, to propose pacifist principles to the intellectuals of the time, enabling France to play a role in the process of European unity around peace.

Some intellectuals, such as the philosopher Han Ryner, supported conscientious objection in their writing, though the concept did not become widely known within France until the 1920s. The phrase objecteur de conscience (conscientious objector) entered French dictionaries in 1933. The historian Norman Ingram has argued that despite this, the word would have been commonly used earlier by many in society. Some books on the topic of conscientious objection were published as early as the 1920s. Even with public awareness, conscientious objectors were not recognised by the French state for several decades, however, and thus had little to no recourse; recognition of conscientious objection was only codified in 1963.

In the 1920s, there were groups active in France that supported conscientious objection, such as War Resisters' International and the International Fellowship of Reconciliation.

The Catholic peace activist Marc Sangnier organised the Bierville conference in 1926, which was supported by the Church. The event, which was attended by bishops from Ârras, Chalons, Monaco, and Versailles, involved a trip to WWI battlefields.

Some individuals opposed conscription on religious grounds, such as Henri Roser, a pastor and head of the French branch of the International Fellowship of Reconciliation. For his stance, he was imprisoned.

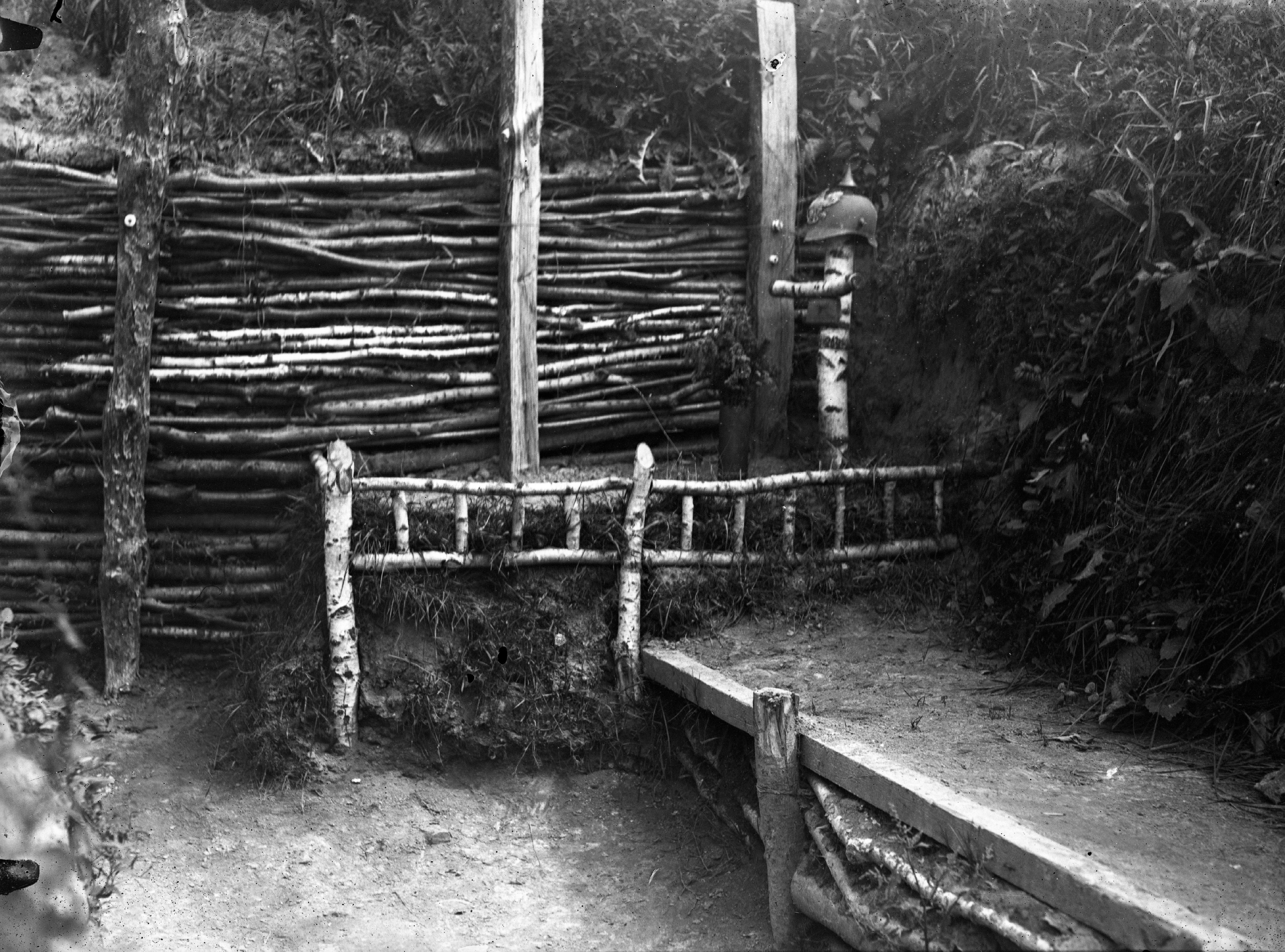
A trench tomb: 1,150,000 French people were killed during the First World War. (Note: The number includes killed, missing in action, and dead from wounds)

Some historians, such as Omer Bartov and Antoine Proost, believe the damage caused by the war created circumstances in France during the 1920s and 1930s that were ripe for pacifism.

The historian Sandi E. Cooper has argued that the First World War created interest among feminist groups in improving social issues such as school curricula and building playgrounds. This, she has argued, differs from other anti-militarist movements, which focused on more political issues, such as revolution and socialism.

=== During the Second World War ===
Before the Second World War, in the inter-war period France had disarmed as well as many other countries within the League of Nations. The covenant of the League of Nations (which France was part of) stated in article 8 that "The Members of the League recognise that the maintenance of peace requires the reduction of national armaments to the lowest point consistent with national safety and the enforcement by common action of international obligations." By 1939, France had generally rearmed but, their tactics were generally out of date.

During and after the war, there was a level of discontentment and anger towards pacifism, which many perceived to have caused the nation's fall.

Little information is known about pacifist movements during the German occupation. For example, the Red Cross has no archives from 1940 to 1946.

=== 1945–2000 ===
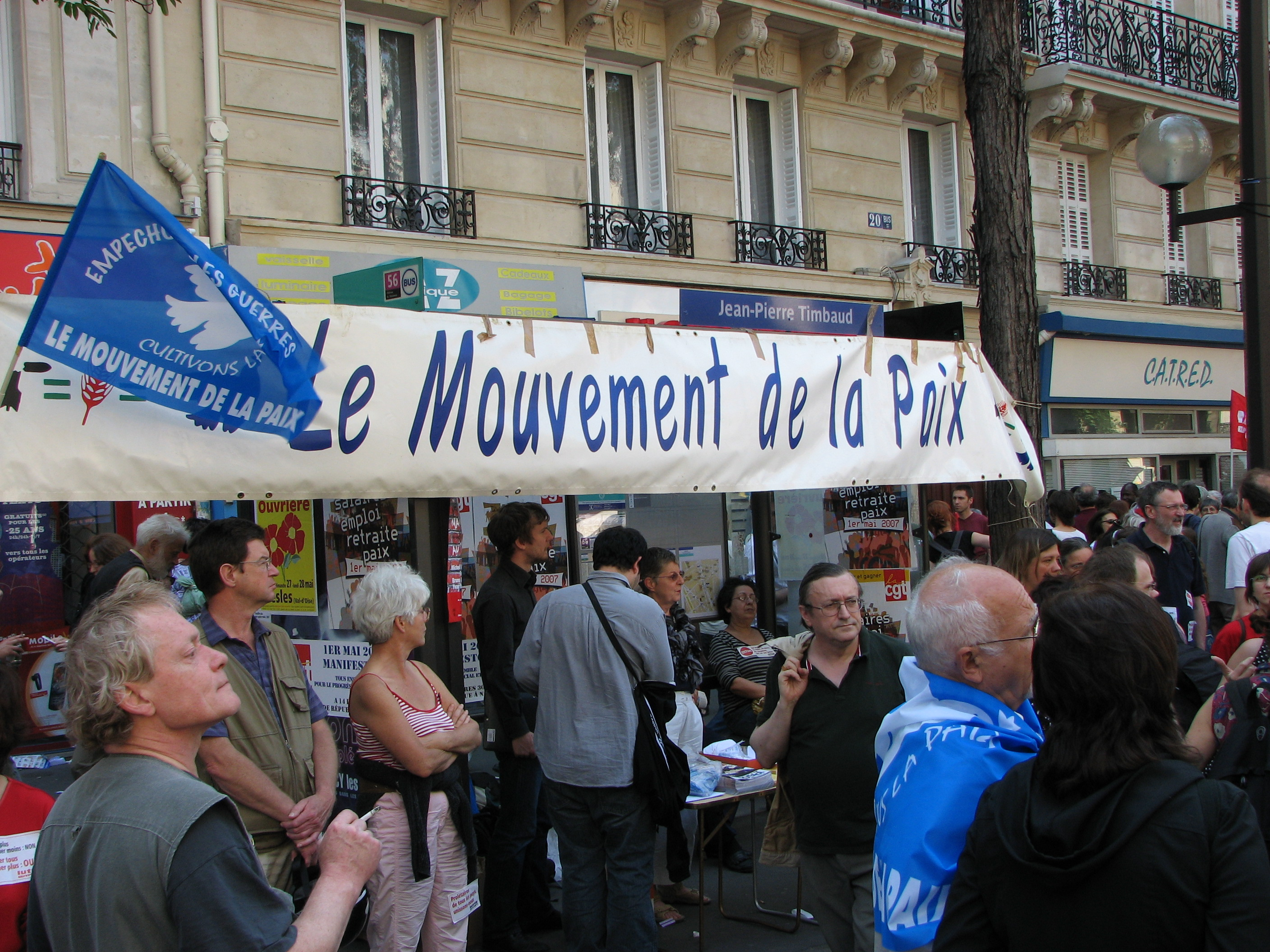
The French peace movement, Mouvement De La Paix, was established in 1948.

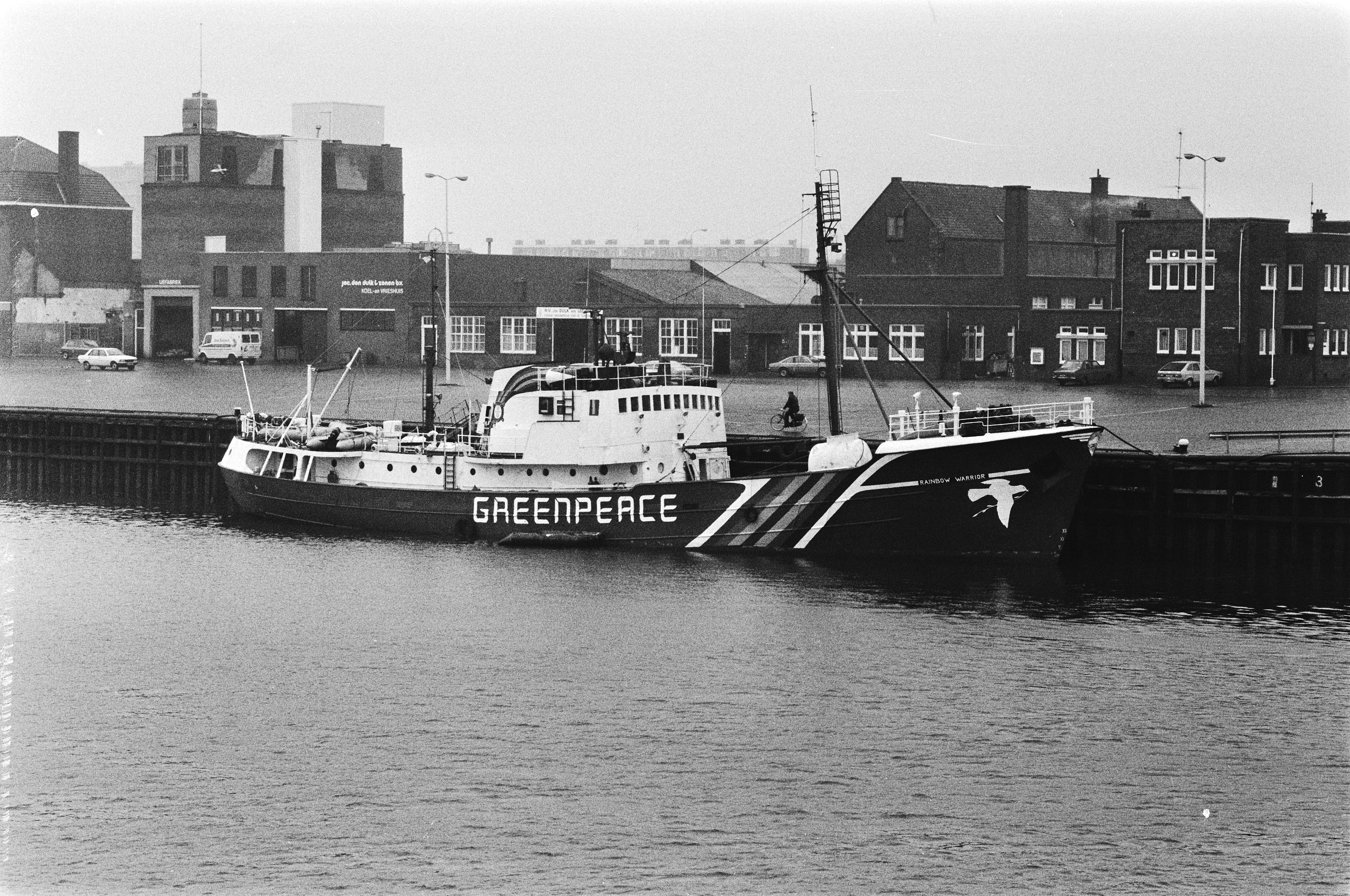
The Rainbow Warrior was sunk in 1985.

Jacques Fontanel has argued that disarmament led to pacifism becoming a taboo after World War II and the subsequent invasion of France in 1940. On 26 June 1945, 50 countries, including France, signed the Charter of the United Nations,which proclaims that members should be committed to saving succeeding generations from war. France is a permanent member of the United Nations Security Council, nations with special privileges and a "responsibility for the maintenance of international peace and security". In addition to the UN, another pacifist organisation, Pax Christi, was founded on 13 March 1945.

The NGO Mouvement de la Paix ("movement of peace") was founded in 1948, with the purpose of opposing war and nuclear armaments. The organisation has called for peace talks and condemned international aggression.

A law was passed in December 1963, granting conscientious objectors legal status. This had been campaigned for by many but especially Louis Lecoin, who went on hunger strike in order for the law to be drafted. France has not required military service since 1997. (Note: Although some sources date the end of national service to 1996, this was the policy announcement.)

The French pacifist movement began to merge into a movement against Nuclear weapons testing along with neutralism and communism during the 1950s and 1960s. The French government's relationship with these protesters was generally negative. The French intelligence service, the DGSE, bombed the Greenpeace-owned boat Rainbow Warrior on 10 July 1985. The vessel had been used in protests against French nuclear tests in the Pacific. The event drew little domestic opposition, though it was condemned internationally. At the time, Foreign Affairs reported rising discontent in the region and internationally with the French presence in the Pacific.

Greenpeace and Mouvement De La Paix joined protests aimed at ending French nuclear testing programs in 1995. A year later, Greenpeace protesters were arrested by the French navy during a major event. France was one of the first countries to ratify the Comprehensive Nuclear-Test-Ban Treaty in 1998.

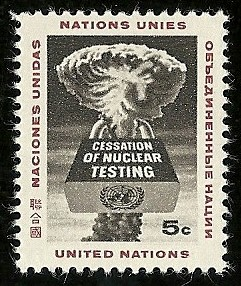
The United Nations called for the cessation of nuclear tests.

== 21st century ==
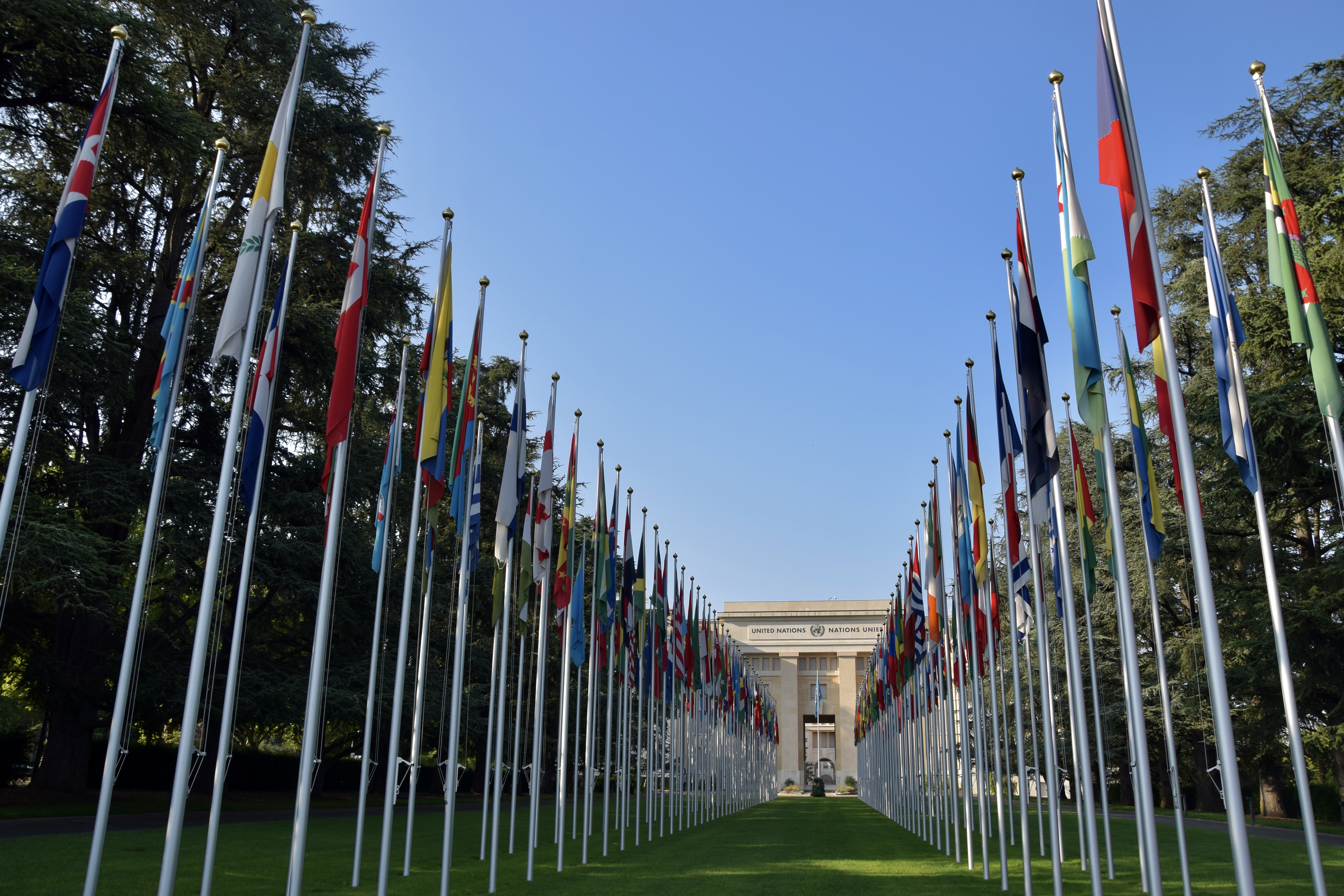
In 2021, the French government was the sixth-biggest contributor to UN peacekeeping operations.

Since 2021, France has been the sixth-biggest contributor to UN peacekeeping operations, with 683 military staff deployed that year. Over 300 military and police cooperation officers were sent to 50 separate countries. The French delegation to the United Nations reconfirmed their commitment to pacifism in 2025. In 2026, the nation contributed 611 of the 7,448 UN peacekeepers.

Mouvement De La Paix has called for peace talks during the Russo-Ukrainian war and has condemned the Russian offensive action. In 2023, the movement started a petition for peace.

The Élysée Palace hosted a conference on the Gaza war in 2023. Pax Christi then published a statement, calling for an immediate ceasefire. In 2024, several organisations, including Pax Christi, called for the end of arms transfers to both Israeli and Palestinian groups.

The French government's 2025 stated intention to increase its military budget to 3.5% of GDP was criticized by pacifist movements, with Mouvement De La Paix saying, "Money for healthcare, not for nuclear weapons!"

Despite France's commitment to peacekeeping, the nation ranked 99 on the 2026 Global Peace Index. It was ranked as the least peaceful country in Western and Central Europe, due to an increase in domestic violent crime. The French government announced in 2025 that it would begin voluntary military service by mid-2026.

== Notable French pacifists ==
- Frédéric Passy (1822–1912), an economist whose father fought in the Battle of Waterloo. In 1901, he was awarded the Nobel Peace Prize along with Henry Dunant, founder of the Red Cross.
- Jean Jaurès (1859–1914) was a socialist leader who tried to stop the First World War from breaking out. He was assassinated on 31 July 1914 by Raoul Villain, a nationalist.
- Émile Arnaud (1864–1921), coined the word "pacifism" and wrote for as well as edited the anarchist publications L'Ère nouvelle (1901–1911), L'Anarchie (1905–1914), L'En-Dehors (1922–1939), and L'Unique (1945–1953).
- Louis Lecoin (1888–1971) was jailed for five years in 1917 for refusing to fight in the First World War. In 1958, he launched a campaign for a law for conscientious objectors as well as a subsequent hunger strike; the law was passed in 1963.

== See also ==
- Mennonites
- Peace Through Law Association
- Pacifism in the United States
- Pacifism in Germany
- Pacifism in Spain
- Anti-nuclear movement in France
