= Gabrielle Duchêne =

French feminist and pacifist

- Born: 26 February 1870; Paris, France
- Died: 3 August 1954 (aged 84); Zurich, Switzerland
- Occupations: Feminist and pacifist

Gabrielle Duchêne (26 February 1870 – 3 August 1954) was a French feminist and pacifist who was active in the French section of the Women's International League for Peace and Freedom (WILPF).

== Early years ==
Gabrielle Duchêne was born into a bourgeois family in Paris on 26 February 1870. Although she became a socialist, she was a wealthy woman. She became interested in politics with the Dreyfus affair, and then became involved in philanthropic work. In 1908 she co-founded Entr’aide (Mutual Aid), a cooperative for the makers of lingerie and fashion items. In the following years she fought against exploitation of home workers in the garment industry, for higher wages and improved working conditions, for establishing a law defining minimum wages (which was enacted on 10 July 1915), for equal pay and for the promotion of syndicalism through education of the workers.

Duchêne was a member of the council of the Chemiserie-Lingerie union, and from 1913 to 1915 she was president of the labor section of the National Council of French Women (CNFF: Conseil National des femmes françaises). She founded the French Office of Home Labor (OFTD: Office français du Travail à domicile) in 1913. She also founded the French Office for Women's Interests (OFIF: Office français des intérêts féminins). Duchêne tried to reconcile radical unionist feminists with politically moderate bourgeois feminists, and promoted collaboration between the two groups.

== World War I ==
During World War I (1914–18) Duchêne founded and became Assistant Secretary of the Inter-Union Committee for Action Against Exploitation of Women (CIACEF: Comité intersyndical d’action contre l’exploitation de la femme). From the start of the war she was one of the small minority of pacifists who refused to accept the Union sacrée, an agreement by the left wing not to strike or take other action that could hinder the war effort. In 1915 Duchêne ceased union activism to devote her efforts to the pacifist cause, but retained her interest in the economic liberation of women. That year she was invited to the Hague Congress, where she met pacifists from many countries and where the idea emerged of creating an international league of women for pacifism and liberty. She was President of the French section of the International Committee of Women for Permanent Peace (Comité international des femmes pour la paix permanente) founded in 1915.

Duchene continued to agitate for peace throughout the war, without regard for her reputation or the risk of prosecution. The Comité d'Action Suffragiste (CAS) was created in December 1917, directed by Jeanne Mélin, Marthe Bigot and Gabrielle Duchêne. The CAS organized meetings to which they tried to attract workers, for example by showing films. As well as agitating for women's suffrage, the CAS wanted to organize a referendum to end the fighting.

== Later years ==
The Women's International League for Peace and Freedom (WILPF, Ligue internationale des femmes pour la paix et la liberté) was founded in 1919. Duchêne created the French section of the WILPF and directed it until her death in 1954. As she acknowledged, the Women's International League members were "women of the privileged classes". Until World War II (1939–45) Duchene was deeply involved in the WILPF, both in France and internationally.

Duchêne was not given a passport to attend the peace conference in Zurich in 1919, but she and fifteen working women sent a letter to the congress that offered to "women of other nations good wishes and assurance that we are ready to work with them more ardently than ever to prepare the 'peace of tomorrow.'" She was among the WILPF delegates at the Versailles Peace Conference. After participating in the campaign to aid Russia between 1920 and 1923, she became increasingly sympathetic to the Russians. Following this she was associated with organizations such as the League against Imperialism and Colonial Oppression, and the Society of Friends of the USSR. Duchêne's pacifist beliefs were gradually influenced by the Russian experience, and have been called "tinged pacifism".

In February 1927, Duchêne participated in Brussels in the Congress where the League against Imperialism and Colonial Oppression was founded. Under the guidance of the Third International the league tried to develop struggles for independence in the European colonies. She made her first visit to Russia in October 1927. On her return she was openly a "fellow traveler" of the French Communist Party. She thought of Russia as a "land of peace" and a place where women were liberated, but did not have any profound understanding of Communist ideology. She was founder and secretary general of the Circle of the New Russia (Cercle de la Russie Neuve), which claimed to be independent of Russia and apolitical. However, her pacifist writings and speech included communist and pro-Russian propaganda, which caused tensions in the French section of the WILPF and in the WILPF's International Executive Committee.

Duchêne participated in the General Conference on Disarmament in Frankfurt (1929) and in Paris (1932), as well as in developing the Congress Against Imperialist War in August 1932 and in forming the World Committee Against War (Comité mondial contre la guerre). In the Congress Against War and Imperialism in Amsterdam, where the foundations were laid for the Amsterdam-Pleyel Movement, she was sponsored by Romain Rolland and Henri Barbusse. She was then one of the secretaries of the World Committee Against War and Fascism.

In 1934 Duchêne organized the World Assembly of Women, and chaired its World Committee of Women against War and Fascism (CMF: Comité mondial des femmes contre la guerre et le fascisme). The CMF was formed at a congress in Paris in August 1934. Cor Ramondt-Hirschmann of the Netherlands records that the invitation left "no doubt whatever" about "the absolute communist character" of the proposal, although groups and individuals with diverse opinions were invited. Duchêne said the congress had a mood of great enthusiasm and brought together "the women that race, geographical situation, social milieu, intellectual formation, religion, philosophical conviction, individual or general interests, everything, finally, had separated until now". Efforts were made to avoid the meeting being a Communist Congress, but a WILPF member said the congress was pervaded by "the powerful current of Communist sympathy. The WILPF supported the CMF but remained a separate entity.

Duchêne was present at the founding conference of the Universal Assembly for Peace in Brussels in September 1936. World War II (1939–45) was a difficult period for Duchêne, but by great good fortune her apartment was never raided and her records remain intact. Gabrielle Duchêne died on 3 August 1954 in Zurich, Switzerland, at the age of 84.

== See also ==
- List of peace activists

== Works ==
- Guerre (War, Krieg). Preface by Gabrielle Duchene (2 ed.). Geneva: Commission de la guerre scientifique et du désarmement de la Ligne internationale des femmes pour la paix et la liberté. 1935.

== Sources ==
- Carle, Emmanuelle (July 2004). "Gabrielle Duchêne et la recherche d'une autre route". Archives du Féminisme (in French) (7). Archived from the original on 2019-06-06.
- Dreyfus, Michel (1985). "Le fonds féministe à la BDIC". Matériaux pour l'histoire de notre temps (in French). 1 (1): 21–23. doi:10.3406/mat.1985.403982.
- Fell, Alison S. (2009). Femmes Face À la Guerre. Peter Lang. ISBN 978-3-03911-332-3.
- Maitron (2015). "DUCHÊNE Gabrielle [DUCHÊNE Mathilde, Denise, dite". Dictionnaire Biographique Mouvement Ouvrier Mouvement Social. Maitron.
- Rupp, Leila J. (1997). Worlds of Women: The Making of an International Women's Movement. Princeton University Press. p. 35. ISBN 0-691-01675-5.
- Sklar, Kathryn Kish; Schüler, Anja; Strasser, Susan (1998). Social Justice Feminists in the United States and Germany: A Dialogue in Documents, 1885–1933. Cornell University Press. ISBN 0-8014-8469-3.
