= Pouget =

Pouget may refer to:

== Places ==
- Château Pouget, winery in the Margaux appellation of the Bordeaux region of France
- Le Pouget, commune in the Hérault department in the Languedoc-Roussillon region in southern France
- Le Pouget (power station), hydroelectric power station located at Le Truel, on the River Tarn, in the department of Aveyron in France

== People with the surname ==
- Bertrand du Pouget (1280–1352), French papal diplomat and Cardinal
- Christian Pouget (born 1966), French ice hockey player
- Cyrille Pouget (born 1972), French soccer player
- Ely Pouget (born 1961), American actress and model
- Émile Pouget (1860–1931), French anarchist and revolutionary syndicalist
- Guillaume Pouget (1847–1933), French Vincentian priest
- Jean-François-Albert du Pouget (1818–1904), French anthropologist and palaeontologist
- Jules Pouget (1884-1963), French politician
- Pouget (cyclist), a French cyclist
