= Marie-Louise Rochebillard =

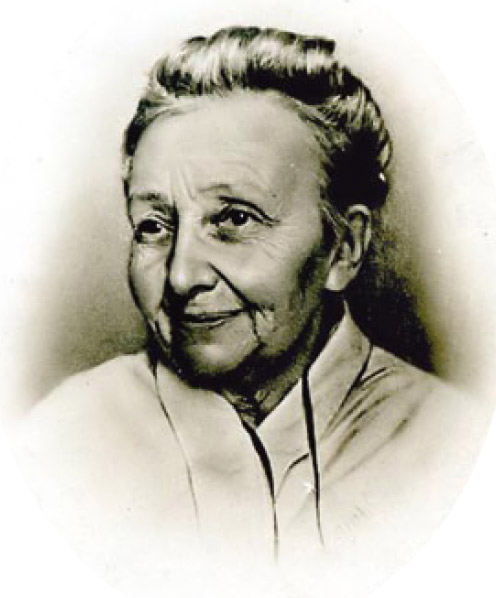
- Marie-Louise Rochebillard c. 1934
- Born: 4 June 1860; Changy, Loire, France
- Died: 30 January 1936 (aged 75); Lyon, France

Marie-Louise Rochebillard (4 June 1860 – 30 January 1936) was a French Social Catholic and pioneer of female trade union activity.

== Early years ==
Marie-Louise Rochebillard was born on 4 June 1860 in Changy, not far from Roanne. Her father, Jean-Claude Rochebillard, was a notary. Her mother, Léonie Depalle, was much younger than him. With a change in the family fortunes, from the age of sixteen Marie-Louise was given "the great honor of working for a living". She experienced the harsh conditions experienced by working women, who often had less security, lower wages and longer hours than men. She knew of the efforts of the Social Catholics, but these addressed the problems of men. With the publication of the Rerum novarum encyclical in 1891 she came to believe there was no obstacle to women also taking action.

== Union leader ==
In 1899 Rochebillard and some friends, also working women, created the first two women's unions. Rochebillard became president of the Union of Women Employed in Commerce, and helped found the Union of Lyon Needle-workers. Cécile Desvignes was president of the needlework union. These unions marked the birth of women's Christian unionism. Soon after they founded the Union of Women Silk Workers.

The founders took advice from the corporation of Lyon silk works employees, a Christian workers' union founded in 1886. The statutes of the new unions ensured that the founders would control the administration, and defined the aims including creation of professional courses, employment offices and institutions to provide mutual aid and assurance. Members were required to pay small fees. Rochebillard left her job and devoted herself to union work.

By 1900 one hundred volunteer teachers were offering a wide range of courses on subjects that ranged from literacy and bookkeeping to English and music. Courses were also given on domestic work, including cooking and first aid. By 1901 the union also had an apprentice section, an employment bureau and a mutual aid society. The monthly Le Travail de la femme et de la jeune fille gave information and advice. In 1903 Rochebillard founded the Association des anciennes élèves de l'enseignement libre (Association of Alumni of Free Education), with up to 4,000 members devoted to defense of religious education.

== Later years ==
From 1910 Rochebillard reduced her involvement to directing the professional courses. After World War I (1914–18) she moved to La Ferrandière, a home for young women, where she died on 30 January 1936. The unions she founded participated in the formation of the Conféderation française des travailleurs chrétiens (CFTC) in 1919. For her, trade unionism meant independence, liberty and dignity.

== Publications ==
- Marie-Louise Rochebillard (1901). Le travail de la femme à Lyon: monographie de syndicats de femmes. au siège du Comité de défense et de progrès social. p. 20.
- Marie-Louise Rochebillard (1904). Syndicats d'ouvrières lyonnaises. Action populaire. p. 31.

== Sources ==
- Chabot, Joceline (1998). Les débuts du syndicalisme féminin chrétien en France, 1899–1944. Presses Universitaires Lyon. ISBN 978-2-7297-0730-9.
- Hours, Henri (2002). "Marie-Louise Rochebillard pionnière du catholicisme social féminin". Eglise à Lyon (in French) (14). Musée du Diocèse de Lyon.
- "Marie-Louise Rochebillard" (PDF). Portraits de femmes (in French). Archives municipales de Lyon.
