= Guillaume Pouget =

Vincentian priest (1847–1933)

The Reverend Guillaume Pouget
- Born: 14 October 1847; Maurines, Cantal, France
- Died: 24 February 1933 (aged 85); Paris, France
- Occupation: Priest

Guillaume Pouget (French: [puʒɛ]; 14 October 1847 – 24 February 1933) was a French Vincentian Catholic priest who had great influence on many Christian scholars in the early 20th century.

== Life ==
Guillaume Pouget was born to a poor farming family on 14 October 1847 in Morsanges, a hamlet in the Maurines commune of Cantal 28 kilometres (17 mi) from Saint-Flour, Cantal. He was the oldest of six children. His parents' house was a small, low building of large granite blocks built in 1827, with a ground floor room lit by two windows, and a bedroom on the floor above. He had taught himself to read by the age of five. He first went to school when he was twelve, but only during the winter, helping his father in the fields during the rest of the year. The local priest noticed his extraordinary gifts and persuaded his parents to let him continue his studies. At the age of 15 he was enrolled in the minor seminary of Saint Flour.

Pouget completed his studies at the age of 19 and became a priest of the Pères Lazaristes. From 1872 to 1905 he taught various subjects at Évreux, Saint Flour, Dax and Paris. On 20 July 1905 he was forbidden from further teaching since he was "too far ahead of his time", despite the support of his superior. He accepted this ruling, but continued to be the spiritual father of many priests and intellectuals who came to him for advice. His eyesight began to deteriorate in 1873, and he lost his right eye in April 1895. His left eye failed in January 1909 and he became totally blind. Guillaume Pouget died on 24 February 1933, and is buried in Montparnasse Cemetery.

== Publications ==
Pouget did not publish on his own initiative under his own name, but the following articles have been identified as his:

- G. Gutope [anagram of G. Pouget]. "La fede nella divinità del Cristo durante l'età apostolica". Rivista storia-critica delle scienze teologiche. (November 1906 pp. 813–831; January 1907 pp. 1–12; February 1907 pp. 81–90; April 1907 pp. 249–282).
- G. P. Besse [G. Pouget] (May 1907). "Théologie nouvelle et doctrine catholique". Revue catholique des Églises: 257–274.
- J.P.B. [G. Pouget] (January 1909). "Les Évangiles synoptiques de M.Loisy". Annales de Philosophie chrétienne: 337–366..

Some of his writings was later published by the Lyon printing house La Source of Victor Carlhian. These included:

- Pouget, Guillaume (1923). Origine surnaturelle ou divine de l'Église catholique d'après les données de l'Histoire. Carlhian.
- Pouget, Guillaume (1927). L' Origine du mal moral et la chute primitive. la Source. p. 94.
- Guillaume Pouget (1930). L'Inspiration de la Bible. la Source.
- Pouget, Guillaume (1931). Le Christ et le monde moral. Carlhian.

Posthumous publications include:

- Pouget, Guillaume; Guitton, Jean (1948). The Canticle of Canticles. D. X. McMullen Company. p. 201.
- Guitton, Jean; Pouget, Guillaume (1954). Dialogues avec Monsieur Pouget sur la pluralité des mondes, le Christ des Évangiles et l'avenir de notre espèce: illustrés de quatre hors-texte dont deux pages d'après des croquis de l'auteur. B. Grasset. p. 258.
- Pouget, Guillaume (1955). Logia: propos et enseignements. Grasset. p. 320.
- Pouget, Guillaume; Chevalier, Jacques (1957). Mélanges: 1. Préface de Jacques Chevalier. Plon. p. 237.
- Guitton, Jean; Howard, William Cecil James Philip John Paul (Earl of Wicklow); Murphy, Fergus; Pouget, Guillaume (1959). Dialogues Avec Monsieur Pouget. Abbé Pouget Discourses ... Translated ... by Fergus Murphy ... With a Biographical Note by the Earl of Wicklow. Dublin; Burns Oates & Washbourne: London. p. 163.

== Sources ==
- Chalaye, Marcel (2003). "Qui était Guillaume Pouget ?". Lettre d'Ananie (in French). Archived from the original on 2015-07-11.
- Chento, Javier F. (2012-12-31). "Au Pays de M. Pouget". Histoire de la Congrégation de la Mission. Archived from the original on 2015-07-11.
- Poulat, E. (1979). Histoire dogme et critique dans la crise moderniste. Tournai: Casterman.
- "Victor Carlhian" (in French). Musée du diocèse de Lyon.
