= Joseph Vialatoux =

French Catholic philosopher (1880–1970)

- Born: 2 July 1880; Grézieu-la-Varenne, Rhône, France
- Died: 2 March 1970 (aged 89); Vaugneray, Rhône, France
- Occupation: Philosopher
- Known for: La Cité de Hobbes

Joseph Vialatoux (2 July 1880 – 2 March 1970) was a French Catholic philosopher based in Lyon, a leading member of the Catholic social activist Chronique sociale. He had liberal Christian democratic views. He was a prolific author, and an early critic of the right-wing Action Française.

== Life ==
=== Early years ===
Joseph Vialatoux was born in Grézieu-la-Varenne, Rhône, on 2 July 1880. His parents were Gabriel Vialatoux, a notary, and Jeanne Perrier. His mother died when he was five. He was sent as a boarder to the Carthusian college in Lyon. He admired the philosophers René Descartes, Maurice Blondel and Henri Bergson. Arthur Hannequin, professor of philosophy at the University of Lyon, introduced him to Immanuel Kant, whose work was frowned upon by conservative Catholics at the time. He obtained diplomas in Law, Literature and Philosophy.

At first Vialatoux was influenced by positivism and the counter-revolution. This changed when he met Marius Gonin, (Note: Marius Gonin was a silk worker, celibate and mystic The Chronique des Comités du Sud-Est ("Chronicle of the Southeast Committees") was founded in 1892 by Marius Gonin and Victor Berne.) who introduced him to a living form of Christianity, much more than dry texts and legends. He decided to give up his law studies and, after he had completed his military service, to place himself at the service of the church.

=== Journalist ===
Vialatoux was a journalist and lecturer from 1904 to 1914, and was editorial secretary for the journal Démocratie du Sud Est. He was an active member of the Semaines Sociales. He married Jeanne Audibert in Vaugneray in 1905. They had five children. Vialatoux was one of the first Catholics to criticize the right-wing Action Française. Between April 1908 and March 1909 the Chronique du Sud-Est published three articles by Vialatoux that criticized the Action Française. (Note: The Chronique des Comités du Sud-Est was the publishing arm of the Semaine sociale.)

=== Teacher ===
Vialatoux taught philosophy in various private secondary schools in Lyon between 1914 and 1945. He was influenced by Blondel, but after World War I (1914–18) he considered himself a Thomist. He wrote a study of the Action Française leader Charles Maurras that appeared in the Chronique sociale de France 35 (December 1926), and was then published as a monograph La Doctrine catholique et l'école de Maurras: Étude critique in 1927. He found the positivism of Maurras as completely incompatible with Christianity. Vialatoux supported the Christian democratic Parti démocrate populaire (PDP). He thought politics should by "moralized", and morality should "penetrate and inform from within all human activities, in order to determine essentially and in the interior the weight to be given to each form of activity, and to integrate all of them in the unifying finality of Man."

In a treatise on Thomas Hobbes, La Cité de Hobbes: Théorie de l'état totalitaire (1935), Vialatoux wrote, "To proclaim a kingdom of God is to let loose—apparently—a new war in the heart of the citizen. For shall we not, in consequence, run the risk of finding ourselves divided between two laws—that of the State and that of God? This problem was bound to disturb, at the very least, the author of Leviathon." Carl Schmitt wrote of this treatise that "he elevates [Hobbes] into the philosopher of the present-day totalism and ultimately, indiscriminately as the church father of bolshevism, fascism and national socialism as well as German Christians." René Capitant disputed Vialatoux's position, saying Hobbes had founded the modern tradition of individualism, which led to liberalism rather than totalitarianism.

From 1945 to 1960 Vialatoux was a professor at the Catholic University of Lyon. In a letter to Bishop Alfred-Jean-Félix Ancel dated 7 April 1949 Vialatoux explained although he was aged 69, due to lack of savings he still had to teach full-time at the secondary and undergraduate levels. Joseph Vialatoux died in Vaugneray, Rhône, on 2 March 1970.

== Publications ==
- Les catholiques lyonnais et la Chronique Sociale, Christian Ponson, Lyon 1979.
- La Liberté de la Personne Humaine (P.U.F.)
- La Philosophie séparatiste de Locke et l'irresponsabilité libérale, 1913.
- Un Grand débat catholique et français: Témoignages sur l'Action française, Paris, 1927.
- La Doctrine catholique et l'école de Maurras, étude critique [Texte imprimé], Paris, 1927.
- Le Discours et l'intuition : leçons philosophiques sur la connaissance humaine et la croyance, introductives à l'étude de la logique et de la métaphysique, Préface de Jacques Chevalier, Paris, 1930.
- Morale et politique : réflexions sur les études du P. de Broglie, science politique et doctrine chrétienne, 1931.
- Philosophie économique : études critiques sur le naturalisme, 1932.
- La Cité totalitaire de Hobbes : théorie naturaliste de la civilisation : essai sur la signification de l'existence historique du totalitarisme, 1935.
- De Durkheim à Bergson, Bloud & Gay, 1939.
- Pour lire Platon, Paris, 1939.
- Le Problème de la légitimité du pouvoir, Vichy, ou de Gaulle ?, Paris, 1945.
- L'intention philosophique, Paris, 1952.
- Signification humaine du travail, Paris, 1953.
- La morale de Kant, Paris, 1956.
- Le peuplement humain : faits et questions, doctrines et théories, signification humaines du mariage. Tome premier, Faits et questions, Paris, 1957
- Le peuplement humain : faits et questions, doctrines et théories, signification humaine du mariage. Tome II, Doctrines et théories, Signification humaine du mariage, Paris, 1959.
- La répression et la torture : essai de philosophie morale et politique, 1957.

== Sources ==
- André, Simone (2015). "Parc Joseph Vialatoux - Le Jardin de Philosophie" (in French). Commune de Vaugneray.
- Arnal, Oscar L. Cole (1992). Prêtres en bleu de chauffe: histoire des prêtres-ouvriers, 1943-1954. Editions de l'Atelier. ISBN 978-2-7082-2980-8.
- Bernardi, Peter J. (2009-01-01). Maurice Blondel, Social Catholicism, and Action Française: The Clash Over the Church's Role in Society During the Modernist Era. CUA Press. ISBN 978-0-8132-1542-6.
- Franco, Paul; Marsh, Leslie (2012-09-25). A Companion to Michael Oakeshott. Penn State Press. ISBN 978-0-271-06019-4.
- Jodock, Darrell (2000-06-22). Catholicism Contending with Modernity: Roman Catholic Modernism and Anti-Modernism in Historical Context. Cambridge University Press. ISBN 978-0-521-77071-2.
- "Joseph Vialatoux (1880-1970)". BnF.
- Lubac, Henri de (1999-01-01). The Splendor of the Church. Ignatius Press. ISBN 978-0-89870-742-7.
- Passmore, Kevin (2002-05-16). From Liberalism to Fascism: The Right in a French Province, 1928-1939. Cambridge University Press. ISBN 978-0-521-89426-5.
- Pierrard, Pierre (1988). Les laïcs dans l'Eglise de France: XIXe-XXe siècle (in French). Editions de l'Atelier. ISBN 978-2-7082-2563-3.
- Ponson, Christian (1992). "JosephVialatoux (1880-1970( Le Philosophe Lyonnais des Semaines Sociales". Cent ans de catholicisme social a Lyon et en Rhône-Alpes: la postérité de Rerum novarum (in French). Editions de l'Atelier. ISBN 978-2-7082-2954-9.
- Poucet, Bruno (1998). Entre l'Église et la République. Editions de l'Atelier. ISBN 978-2-7082-4349-1.
- Tralau, Johan (2013-09-13). Thomas Hobbes and Carl Schmitt: The Politics of Order and Myth. Routledge. ISBN 978-1-317-99102-1.
