= Chronique sociale =

French Catholic organization

Chronique Sociale
- Formation: 1892
- Founded at: Lyon, France
- Type: Publisher
- Legal status: Limited liability company
- Purpose: Encourage social cooperation
- Headquarters: 1 rue Vaubecour - 69002 Lyon
- Coordinates: 45.755378°N 4.827270°E
- Region served: France
- Services: Publishing, education
- Official language: French
- Website: www.chroniquesociale.com

The Chronique Sociale (Social Chronicle) is a French organization founded in Lyon in 1892 to publish what became an influential organ of Catholic social activism. From 1904 the publishers began arranging annual study weeks (semaines sociales) where Social Catholics could meet and exchange ideas. The parent organization continues to promote training and education about social cooperation, and a related limited company publishes books.

== Early years ==
The Chronique des Comités du Sud-Est ("Chronicle of the Southeast Committees") was founded in 1892 by Marius Gonin and Victor Berne. Gonin was a silk worker, celibate and mystic. At first the journal was just a newsletter for the distributors of La Croix, but it soon became the main organ of the Social Catholics in Lyon. (Note: The city of Lyon was a center of Catholic social activism. The first women's Christian unions were founded in Lyon in 1899 by Marie-Louise Rochebillard.) It described itself as an "organ of social animation." In the first years it promoted church teachings on social action as defined in the encyclical Rerum novarum. The Chronique gave the views of a group of lay Catholics that accepted Christian-democratic principles of social reform, and quickly attracted opposition from conservatives.

== 1900–1945 ==
The journal was formally registered in July 1901. The readers were typically clerks, skilled workers and young clergymen. Given the choice of rebuilding the state in a Christian model, reforming society through Christian social, political and professional institutions, or bringing a Christian spirit to a secular society, the journal alternated between the latter two. This reflected the divergent views of its leaders. Berne and Gonin leaned towards the second view, and Critinon, Vialatoux and Hughes towards the third.

From 1904 the Chronique sponsored study weeks (semaines sociales) each year that were attended by leading French social catholic activists. Marius Gonin founded the semaines sociales aided by Adéodat Boissard and Henri Lorin. For the next five years these "social weeks" were the main place for exchange of progressive social ideas within the church. Attendees discussed questions such as socialism, class struggle, strikes, factory abuses and liberation of the working classes. Other issues included Labor Contracts (1909, Bordeaux), Economic Role of the State (1922, Strasbourg), Women in Society (1927, Nancy) and The Disorder in the International Economy and Christian Thought (1932, Lille). The Chronique des Comités du Sud-Est became the publishing arm of the Semaine sociale, and the base for its secretariat. It published the Actes des Semaines sociales de France that recorded the proceedings of the annual meetings.

The journal changed its name to La Chronique du Sud-Est. Between April 1908 and March 1909 the Chronique du Sud-Est published three articles by Joseph Vialatoux that criticized the right-wing Action Française. The journal became the Chronique sociale in 1909. Victor Carlhian joined the journal before World War I, contributed articles and became a member of the management committee. From 1909 the journal appeared monthly, and would continue to do so during the remainder of the French Third Republic and throughout the French Fourth Republic (1946–58).

A separate but related limited liability company was created in 1920 to undertake publishing. Between 1921 and 1930 twelve regional secretariats were created, federated into a national union. The Chronique sociale de France remained socially progressive. Despite this, in 1932 it published a study of the ideas of the nationalist Catholic Charles Maurras that compared him to Aristotle. Marius Gonin died in 1937 and was succeeded as secretary-general of the Semaines sociales by Joseph Folliet. Folliet directed the Chronique until 1964, and remained involved until his death in 1972. Before World War II (1939-45) the Chronique opposed Franco and the Nazis, often going against public opinion. During the war Folliet was mobilized and taken prisoner. He returned to Lyon in 1942 and devoted himself to the Chronique.

== Post-war ==
In 1945 the Chronique sociale de France published a special issue Autour du Marxism (About Marxism). The authors tried to remain objective. They discussed Marxist dialectics, Marxism as an expression of the proletariat philosophy and the relationship of Marxism to religion. The journal published the testimony of Pierre Tiberghien in 1952 with a preface that called it a description of the way a Frenchman thought of the activity French Social Catholics, which might not be applicable elsewhere. During the Algerian War (1954–62) Joseph Folliet and Claude Bernardin established the Lyons Committee for the respect of human rights. The Chronique denounced military and civil abuses in Algeria.

Books published during the 1960s included Introduction to family issues (1960), Social security and Victory over Death (1962), Control or Regulation of Birth (1963), Adam and Eve, humanity and sexuality (1966). In the 1960s the journal was concerned with topics such as the future organization of companies and industries, changes in the nature of labor unions, growing specialization of labor and the expanding middle classes. The tone was more that of social engineers than Christians. A board of directors was set up in 1967 to oversee the education and research activities.

The Chronique Sociale today has the objectives of raising awareness of social change and encourage cooperation and respect for individuals. It supports the related activities of research, discussion, training and publishing. The books are organized within five main collections: understanding people, understanding society, education and training, communicating and ways of thinking.

== Sources ==
- Arnal, Oscar L. Cole (1992). Prêtres en bleu de chauffe: histoire des prêtres-ouvriers, 1943-1954. Editions de l'Atelier. ISBN 978-2-7082-2980-8.
- Bernardi, Peter J. (2009-01-01). Maurice Blondel, Social Catholicism, and Action Française: The Clash Over the Church's Role in Society During the Modernist Era. CUA Press. ISBN 978-0-8132-1542-6.
- Chabot, Joceline (1998). Les débuts du syndicalisme féminin chrétien en France, 1899-1944. Presses Universitaires Lyon. ISBN 978-2-7297-0730-9.
- "Cinq collections" (in French). Chronique sociale.
- Duriez, Bruno (2001). Chrétiens et ouvriers en France: 1937-1970. Editions de l'Atelier. ISBN 978-2-7082-3561-8.
- E. M. (December 1945). "La Chronique sociale de France". Esprit. Nouvelle Série (in French). 113 (13). Editions Esprit: 965. JSTOR 24249180.
- "Historique" (in French). Chronique sociale.
- Jodock, Darrell (2000-06-22). Catholicism Contending with Modernity: Roman Catholic Modernism and Anti-Modernism in Historical Context. Cambridge University Press. ISBN 978-0-521-77071-2.
- Tranvouez, Yvon (October–December 1980). "Review: PONSON (Christian). Les Catholiques lyonnais et la Chronique sociale (1892-1914)". Archives de sciences sociales des religions (in French). 50 (2). EHESS. JSTOR 30125349.
- Truchet, Bernadette (1992). "L'Enseignement pontifical a travers les éditoriaux de la "Chronique sociale" (1892-1906)". Cent ans de catholicisme social a Lyon et en Rhône-Alpes: la postérité de Rerum novarum (in French). Editions de l'Atelier. ISBN 978-2-7082-2954-9.
- "Victor Carlhian" (in French). Musée du diocèse de Lyon.
