= Victor Carlhian =

French manufacturer (1875–1959)

- Born: 1875; Briançon, Hautes-Alpes, France
- Died: 1959 (aged 83–84)
- Occupation: Manufacturer
- Known for: Le Van

Victor Carlhian (1875 – 13 September 1959) was a French manufacturer who was involved in various ecumenical Christian societies, published a review and published Christian and moral tracts.

== Life ==
Victor Carlhian was born in 1875 in Briançon, Hautes-Alpes. (Note: Another source gives his birth date as 1876.) His father was from Queyras and his mother was from the Lyon bourgeoisie. His father had a successful business that manufactured embroidery items: spun gold or silver yarn, silk thread, braids, fringes and nets, which Victor Carlhian was destined to inherit. He attended secondary school in Lyon, then was admitted to the University of Paris where he obtained a degree in mathematics and wrote a thesis. While in Paris he joined Le Sillon. (Note: Le Sillon was a review published from 1894 by a group of students at the Collège Stanislas de Paris led by Marc Sangnier. It became a religious and social youth movement, attempting to combine Catholic and Republican ideals.) Carlhian returned to Lyon and in 1907 took charge of the family business. He took full control in 1918. He and Alfred Vanderpol (1854–1915) co-founded a branch of Le Sillon in Lyon, but Carlhian submitted to the condemnation of the movement by Pope Pius X in 1910. Carlhian married Marie de Mijolla in 1912.

Carlhian joined the Chronique sociale (Note: The Chronique sociale was founded in Lyon in 1892 for the purpose of education, exchange of information, research and publishing. It was intended to raise public awareness and support for social change that would improve cooperation and respect for individuals.) to which he contributed articles, and became a member of the management committee. He joined the Lyon group of medical studies led by Dr. René Biot (1889–1966). He organized a secular mission in Le Transvaal, a quarter of the 8th arrondissement of Lyon, in which small groups would witness the gospel through social and educational activities, and through prayer. Carlhian's project was original in the role assigned to the laity, in which a group of lay activists would evangelize in a poor neighborhood through their exemplary attitude, reintroducing the Christian spirit of fraternity. They were led at first by the priest Jean Remillieux, and then when he died in 1915 by his elder brother Laurent Remillieux.

In 1920 Carlhian organized the Groupe de travail en commun, with Emmanuel Mounier (1905–50), Jean Guitton (1901–99) and others. He met Paul Couturier (1881–1953) in 1920 and became aware of ecumenism. Carlhian was one of the founders of the Société lyonnaise de philosophie in 1923, which included teachers at state universities and Catholic schools, Christians and non-Christians. In 1921 Carlhian founded the critical review Le Van, which published reviews of works of philosophy, theology, economics, sociology and science. He wrote 117 editorials for this review, which ceased publication in 1940. He published Cahiers du Van in 1932, which published texts such as La Vie morale de Jacques Chevalier and Le Portrait de Monsieur Pouget de Jean Guitton. He acquired the Lyon printing house La Source, which published various religious or moral works by authors such as Guillaume Pouget and Pierre Teilhard de Chardin.

Carlhian participated in the Groupe des Dombes from 1937 to 1957. In 1954 he and Père Pierre Michalon helped found the Association of Christian Unity. Victor Carlhian died in Lyon on 13 September 1959. His funeral was conducted by Claude Dupuy, auxiliary bishop of Lyon.

== Publications ==
- Victor Carlhian (2013-03-01). Alice Palluault and Emmanuel d'Hombres (ed.). Vouloir être plus et mieux homme : Victor Carlhian : les éditoriaux du Van (1921–1937) (in French). Editions Bellier. pp. 402 pages. ISBN 978-2846312899.

Carlhian wrote a paper in 1908 on Le théorie politique et sociale du Sillon after Cardinal Pierre-Hector Coullié forbade priest and seminarians from attending the Sillon Congress in Lyon on 28–29 November 1907. It was not published.

== Sources ==
- Boudon, Jacques-Olivier; Thelamon, Françoise (2006). Chrétiens dans la ville (Les). Publication Univ Rouen Havre. ISBN 978-2-87775-622-8.
- Ladous, Régis (1992). "Victor Carlhian aux sources du personnalisme". Cent ans de catholicisme social a Lyon et en Rhône-Alpes: la postérité de Rerum novarum. Editions de l'Atelier. ISBN 978-2-7082-2954-9.
- Mayeur, Jean-Marie (2006). Le Sillon de Marc Sangnier et la démocratie sociale: actes du colloque des 18 et 19 mars 2004, Besançon. Presses Univ. Franche-Comté. ISBN 978-2-84867-159-8.
- "Qu'est-ce que la Chronique sociale ?". Chronique sociale. Archived from the original on 2015-06-10.
- "Victor Carlhian" (in French). Musée du diocèse de Lyon. Archived from the original on 2024-03-25.
