= Changy, Loire =

Changy
- Commune
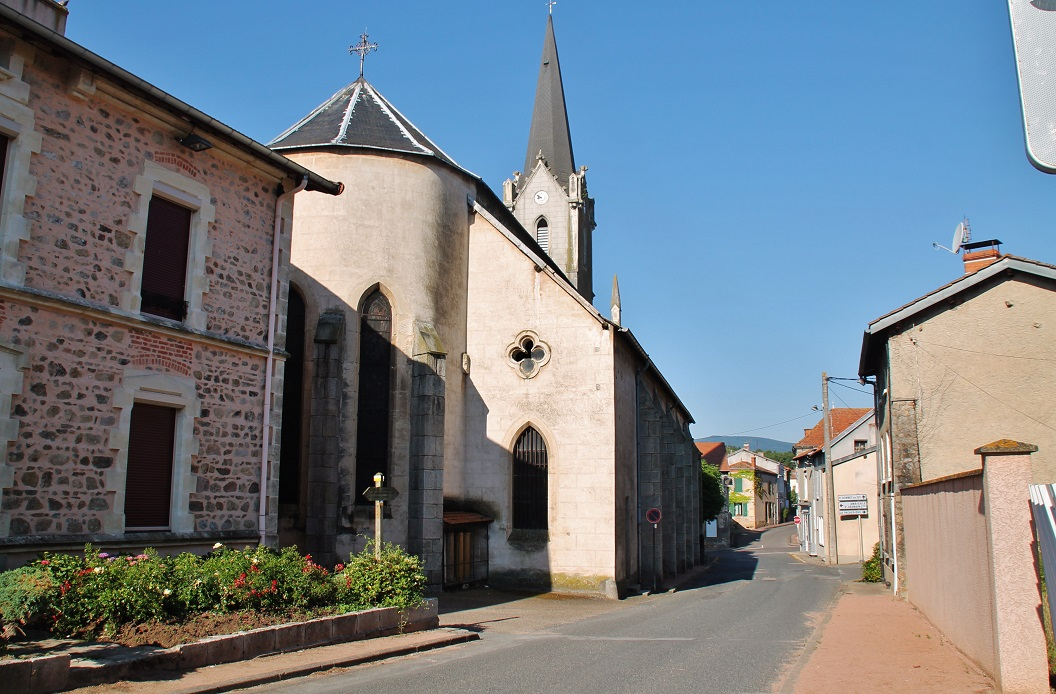
- Location of Changy
- Location within France Location within Auvergne-Rhône-Alpes
- Coordinates: 46°08′34″N 3°53′30″E
- Country: France
- Region: Auvergne-Rhône-Alpes
- Department: Loire
- Arrondissement: Roanne
- Canton: Renaison
- Intercommunality: Roannais Agglomération

Government
  - Mayor (2020–2026): Patricia Goutorbe
- Area^{1}: 13.67 km^{2} (5.28 sq mi)
- Elevation: 360 m (1,180 ft)
- Highest elevation: 556 m (1,824 ft)
- Lowest elevation: 298 m (978 ft)
- Population (2023): 690
  - Density: 50/km^{2} (130/sq mi)
- Time zone: UTC+01:00 (CET)
  - Summer (DST): UTC+02:00 (CEST)
- INSEE/Postal code: 42049 /42310
- ^{1} French Land Register data, which excludes lakes, ponds, glaciers > 1 km^{2} (0.386 sq mi or 247 acres) and river estuaries.

Changy (French pronunciation: [ʃɑ̃ʒi]) is a commune in the Loire department in central France.

== Population ==
Historical population
Year	Pop.	±% p.a.
1968	653	—
1975	616	−0.83%
1982	593	−0.54%
1990	606	+0.27%
1999	582	−0.45%
2007	616	+0.71%
2012	605	−0.36%
2017	637	+1.04%
2023	690	+1.34%
Source: INSEE

== See also ==
- Communes of the Loire department
