= Cornelia Ramondt-Hirschmann =

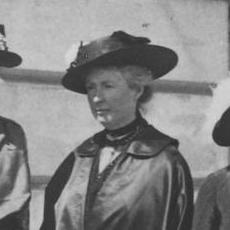
- in 1915
- Born: Susanna Theodora Cornelia Hirschmann; 29 July 1871; The Hague, the Netherlands
- Died: 29 July 1957 (aged 86); Hilversum, the Netherlands
- Other names: Cor Ramondt-Hirschmann
- Occupations: teacher, feminist, pacifist
- Years active: 1890–1940
- Known for: peace activism

Cornelia Ramondt-Hirschmann (29 July 1871 – 20 November 1957) was a Dutch teacher, feminist, pacifist and theosophist active in the first half of the twentieth century. She was one of the women who participated in the push by pacifist feminists during World War I for world leaders to develop a mediating body to work for peace. The culmination of their efforts would be the achievement of the League of Nations when the war ended. Between 1935 and 1937, she served as one of the three international co-chairs of the Women's International League for Peace and Freedom (WILPF).

== Early life ==
Susanna Theodora Cornelia Hirschmann, known as "Cor", was born on 29 July 1871 in The Hague, the Netherlands to Sophie (née Bahnsen) and Frederik Willem Louis Antonie Hirschmann. Her father was an administrator for the Royal Dutch Navy and died when she was nine years old, during a trip from the former Dutch colonies in India. She was raised by her mother in The Hague and attended the Christian Educational Academy in The Hague. In 1889 she earned her Lower Education teaching certificate (Dutch: Lager Onderwijs Akte) and the following year earned a certificate for French.

== Career ==
After her graduation, Hirschmann and her mother moved to Nijmegen, where they supported themselves with her mother's widow's pension and her earnings from teaching. She earned her certification for physical education 1893. It is probable that during their time in Nijmegen, Hirschmann met Dirk Ramondt, a postal worker. Soon after completing her training, she and her mother moved to Utrecht and there on 15 June 1899, she married Ramondt. The young couple moved to Breda and were living there when their daughter Sophie was born.

Coming in contact with the Dutch feminist movement, Ramondt-Hirschmann soon became a supporter of the international mother's association, the Vereeniging voor Vrouwenkiesrecht (VVK) and the International Women's Suffrage Alliance (IWSA). In 1903, the family moved to The Hague and Ramondt-Hirschmann began working as a secretary to the executive board of the Dutch Women's Council (Dutch: Nederlandse Vrouwen Raad (NVR)), with other feminists such as Johanna Naber and Mien van Itallie-van Embden. Around the same time, Ramondt-Hirschmann became involved with the Dutch Vegetarian Association and The Hague Association for Philosophy. She became interested in theosophy and began hosting lectures for the . Ramondt-Hirschmann regularly held presentations for the Dutch section of Theosophical Society.

In 1912, the family moved again, settling in Amsterdam. Ramondt-Hirschmann became involved in the pacifist movement. She served as co-organizer of the International Congress of Women held in 1915 in The Hague. At the conference, Ramondt-Hirschmann was elected to serve as president of the Dutch branch of the International Committee of Women for Permanent Peace (ICWPP), a new organization begun at the conference. Following the Congress, two delegations were formed to present the resolutions from the meeting to heads of state. Ramondt-Hirschmann was on the delegation which presented the resolutions to Scandinavia and Russia. Along with Emily Greene Balch, Chrystal Macmillan, Rosika Schwimmer, and Julia Grace Wales, Ramondt-Hirschmann formed the group speaking to peaceful nations. Jane Addams headed the other delegation, which spoke to nations at war.

The first two stops, Denmark and Norway, were uneventful, with the exception that the taxi driver, who could not believe that a group of women had an appointment to see the King Haakon, circled the palace numerous times before finally delivering the group. In Sweden, they spoke with the Foreign Minister Knut Wallenberg, who agreed that Sweden would be willing to host a peace mediation conference if the women’s delegation could get two warring nations to agree to participate. In war, most diplomats refused to make definitive statements, and encouraged by this development, the group, without Schwimmer, who as a Hungarian could not enter Russia, made plans to go to Petrograd. After several days they managed to secure an interview with the Foreign Minister Sergei Sazonov, who despite his view that nothing would come of such a meeting, wrote a statement that Russia would not oppose a neutral mediating conference. Addams's group secured a similar statement from the Prime Minister of France, René Viviani, though this information was unknown to Ramondt-Hirschmann's group, as by the time they returned to The Hague, where both delegations were to have met, Addams had sailed for the United States.

Meeting with Aletta Jacobs, the delegation decided to split up with Ramondt-Hirschmann and Schwimmer approaching the German Foreign Minister Gottlieb von Jagow, while Balch and Macmillan spoke with the Lord President of the Council Crewe, who was acting British Foreign Secretary. Von Jagow did not see any practical result, but agreed that Germany was not opposed to neutral mediation. Lord Crewe refused to "accept" a proposal, stating only that Britain would not place obstacles to such a meeting or object to a conference if it actually came to fruition. Armed with these statements, Schwimmer secured a promise from Wallenberg that he would present the plan to the Swedish Cabinet. In the meantime, while the delegates were abroad, Aletta Jacobs was putting pressure on the Dutch Prime Minister Pieter Cort van der Linden to host the conference at the Hague. Van der Linden wanted assurances that President Woodrow Wilson would favor conference and sent Jacobs on an official inquiry mission. They were unable to persuade Wilson to act and it would not be until the war had ended that the conference for the League of Nations would occur.

left to right: Catherine E. Marshall, Sir George Paish, Jane Addams, Cor. Ramondt-Hirschmann, Jeanne Melin – Emergency Peace Conference at the Hague "Conference for a New Peace" in 1922

In 1919, Ramondt-Hirschmann traveled with Jacobs and Mien van Wulfften Palthe to the ICWPP meeting in Zürich, where the organization changed its name to the Women's International League for Peace and Freedom (WILPF). Ramondt-Hirschmann became the international secretary of the WILPF in 1921; she would serve as secretary or adjoint secretary until 1936. She divorced her husband on 27 December 1923, gaining custody of her daughter. Between 1924 and 1926, she toured various cities in the United States, making speeches about peace, while her daughter was completing post graduate work at Bryn Mawr College. Between 1927 and 1930, she served as the General Secretary of the Dutch Theosophical Society, attending meetings abroad. In 1934, she and her daughter moved to Hilversum, where Sophie was employed as an educator. That same year, Ramondt-Hirschmann organized a silent demonstration for peace, known as the Women's Peace Walk. Demonstrators marched through The Hague and repeated the protest annually on May 18 until 1940.

In 1935, Ramondt-Hirschmann took part in the protest against the group arrests of political dissidents by the Nazis. Between 1935 and 1937, she served as one of the three international co-chairs of the WILPF. During 1936, she served on the Supervisory Board of the Central Peace Bureau and began her participation in collecting relief funds for those in need due to the Spanish Civil War. In 1938, she returned to The Hague and lived there until the German invasion of the Netherlands, when she returned to Hilversum to live with her daughter and retired from peace work.

== Death and legacy ==
Ramondt-Hirschmann died on 20 November 1957 at her daughter's home in Hilversum. She was one of the most noted women in the feminist pacifist movement of the first half of the twentieth century. She believed that women's participation in international politics would bring a sense of humanity to governance, and thus, their involvement was crucial.

== See also ==
- List of peace activists
