= Maurines =

Commune in Auvergne-Rhône-Alpes, France

- Commune
- Location of Maurines
- Location within France Location within Auvergne-Rhône-Alpes
- Coordinates: 44°52′17″N 3°05′11″E
- Country: France
- Region: Auvergne-Rhône-Alpes
- Department: Cantal
- Arrondissement: Saint-Flour
- Canton: Neuvéglise-sur-Truyère
- Intercommunality: Saint-Flour Communauté

Government
  - Mayor (2020–2026): Pierrette Beauregard
- Area^{1}: 14.29 km^{2} (5.52 sq mi)
- Elevation: 980 m (3,220 ft)
- Highest elevation: 1,056 m (3,465 ft)
- Lowest elevation: 740 m (2,430 ft)
- Population (2023): 102
  - Density: 7.14/km^{2} (18.5/sq mi)
- Time zone: UTC+01:00 (CET)
  - Summer (DST): UTC+02:00 (CEST)
- INSEE/Postal code: 15121 /15110
- ^{1} French Land Register data, which excludes lakes, ponds, glaciers > 1 km^{2} (0.386 sq mi or 247 acres) and river estuaries.

Maurines (French pronunciation: [moʁin]; Occitan: Maurinas) is a commune in the Cantal department in south-central France.

== Population ==
Historical population
Year	Pop.	±% p.a.
1968	196	—
1975	172	−1.85%
1982	147	−2.22%
1990	114	−3.13%
1999	103	−1.12%
2007	99	−0.49%
2012	109	+1.94%
2017	109	+0.00%
2023	102	−1.10%
Source: INSEE

== See also ==
- Communes of the Cantal department
