= Théodore Eugène César Ruyssen =

Théodore Ruyssen
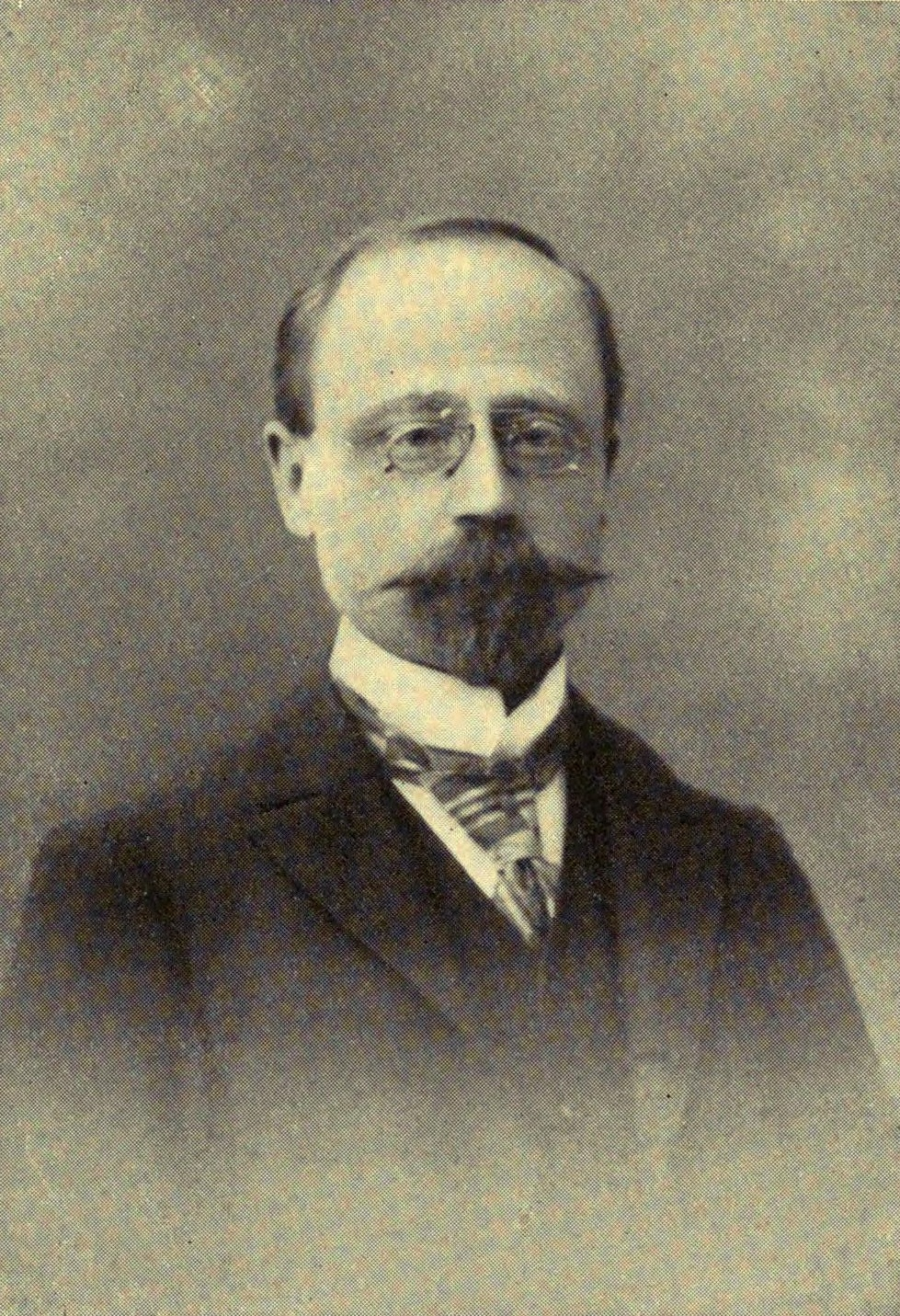
- Born: Théodore Eugène César Ruyssen; August 11, 1868; Clisson, France
- Died: May 5, 1967 (aged 98); Grenoble, France

Philosophical work
- Era: 20th century
- Region: Western Philosophy

Théodore Eugène César Ruyssen (11 August 1868 – 5 May 1967) was a French historian of philosophy and pacifist.

== Biography ==
Ruyssen was born in Clisson, Loire-Atlantique, France. He was professor of the history of philosophy at the University of Bordeaux, and president of l'Association de la Paix par le Droit from 1896 to 1948.

After a study trip through Germany upon leaving school in 1889, Ruyssen took up the profession of teaching in 1896. He taught philosophy in various schools and graduated as Doctor of Philosophy with a thesis on "I'Evolution psychologique du Jugement" in 1903. He lectured successively in the universities of Aix-en-Provence, Dijon and finally, Bordeaux, where he occupied the chair of History of Philosophy.

Ruyssen was the President of the Association de la paix par le droit, the most important peace organization in France, which is widely known throughout the world through its official organ "La Paix par le Droit," and a member of the International Peace Bureau in Berne.

== Works ==
- (1900). Les Grands Philosophes. Kant.
- (1901). Essai sur l'Évolution Psychologique du Jugement.
- (1903). Quid de natura et Origine mali senserit Kantius (thesis).
- (1904) Kant (which was awarded the prize of the French "Institut")
- (1905). La Philosophie de la Paix.
- (1911). Schopenhauer.
- (1923). Les Minorités Nationales d'Europe.
- (1950). La Société Internationale.
