= Jeanne Mélin =

French pacifist, feminist, writer and politician

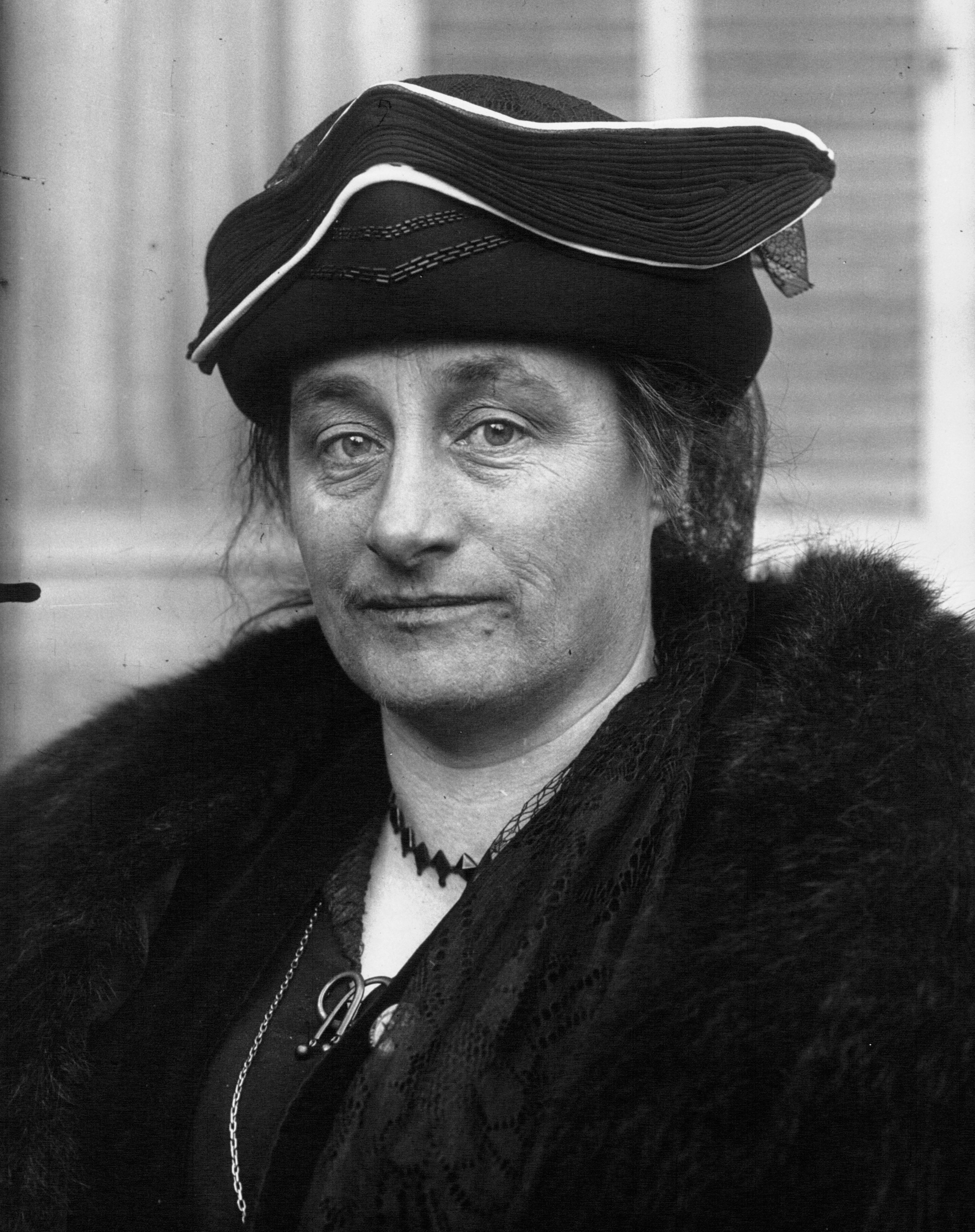
- Jeanne Mélin in 1921 in Marseille
- Born: 17 September 1877; Carignan, Ardennes, France
- Died: 18 April 1964 (aged 86); Sedan, Ardennes, France
- Other name: Thalès Jehanne
- Occupations: Pacifist, feminist, writer and politician

Jeanne Mélin (17 September 1877 – 18 April 1964) was a French pacifist, feminist, writer and politician who wrote under the pseudonym Thalès Jehanne. She fought for peace between France and Germany, and for the right of women to vote. She was a candidate for election as President of France in 1947.

== Early years ==
Jeanne Mélin was born in 1877 in Carignan, Ardennes, to a bourgeois family. Her father, who ran the family brickyard, was an anti-clerical Republican and supporter of Alfred Dreyfus. He was inspired by the theories of Jean-Baptiste André Godin, and was a philanthropist who wanted to put an end to poverty. Jeanne Mélin received a typical education for a girl of her class at the time. She attended the Sainte-Chrétienne de Carignan boarding school for her secondary education. In 1898 Mélin joined Sylvie Hugo Flammarion's association for Peace and Disarmament by Women (La Paix et le Désarmement par les Femmes), and founded a branch of the association in the Ardennes. She developed moderate views based on the pacifist and educational virtues of motherhood.

From 1900 to 1914 Mélin fought for a moderate pacifism based on arbitration of disputes within the Peace Through Law Association (ADP: Association de la paix par le droit). She was influenced by the socialist and pacifist Jean Jaurès. In 1906 she became a member of the French Section of the Workers' International (SFIO: Section Française de l'Internationale Ouvrière). She also joined the French Union for Women's Suffrage (UFSF: Union Française pour le Suffrage des Femmes), where she advocated a staged approach to giving women the franchise. Mélin gained a solid reputation as a speaker through her participation in pacifist and feminist conferences in France and Europe between 1910 and 1914. She had advanced views on morality, and in 1907 advocated birth control and sex education for girls as well as boys.

== World War I ==
The outbreak of World War I (July 1914 – November 1918) caused an upheaval in Mélin's thinking. In August 1914 she was in Brussels at the meeting of European pacifists. She did not accept the passive attitude of German pacifists such Alfred Hermann Fried, who took refuge in Switzerland and avoided comment on German responsibility. She was shocked by the assassination of the anti-militarist leader Jean Jaurès. On 24 August 1914 the Germans reached the Ardennes and her home town, where she lived with her aged parents, was bombed. Her brother was mobilized and the factory that she co-directed with him was closed. She took refuge in Dun-sur-Auron, in the Val de Loire. From September 1914 to August 1915 she was a voluntary inspector at the military hospital in Dun-sur-Auron, which received many amputees.

From 1915 to 1918 Mélin became active in creating networks of feminists and radical pacifists. In March and April 1915 Mélin tried unsuccessfully to persuade the UFSF leaders to support the views of the International Congress of Women for Peace in The Hague (Congrès International des Femmes pour la Paix de La Haye), including abolition of war, women's suffrage and international pacifism and feminism. She was unable to obtain a visa to attend the Hague Congress of April–May 1915. In May 1916 Mélin created Les cuisines coopératives to feed and house refugees from the Ardennes, with the support of the APD. She rehabilitated a run-down hotel in Paris, where she fed and lodged eighty families.

The Comité d'Action Suffragiste (CAS) was created in December 1917, directed by Jeanne Mélin, Marthe Bigot and Gabrielle Duchêne. The CAS organized meetings to which they tried to attract workers, for example by showing films. As well as agitating for women's suffrage, the CAS wanted to organize a referendum to end the fighting. The CAS members did not agree with the UFSF, which openly supported the Union sacrée and took an aggressive nationalist stance in support of the war. At a CAS conference on 7 March 1918 Mélin and Monette Thomas outlined a new constitution for France based on universal suffrage for women and men. It called for men and women to collaborate in rebuilding the cities that had been destroyed and to define new social and international laws. In the 1920s the Women's International League for Peace and Freedom (WILPF) would take up this cause. However, the CAS was unable to make its voice heard by the politicians.

== Later years ==
left to right: Catherine E. Marshall, Sir George Paish, Jane Addams, Cornelia Ramondt-Hirschmann, Mélin - Emergency Peace Conference at the Hague "Conference for a New Peace" in 1922

After the war Mélin continued to agitate for pacifism, under the slogan "Never Again". She placed great hopes in communism, but was later disappointed. Jeanne Mélin was one of two French delegates who attended the International Congress of Women in Zurich in May 1919 and swore to work towards the union of women "in order that war may never more dishonor humanity." She shook hands with Lida Gustava Heymann (1868–1943), who led the German section, and said that the courage of the German pacifists had "saved the honor of their fatherland".

The French section of the WILPF was close to the French Communist Party, and was attacked by the critics of that party. Mélin left the French Communist Party in 1923. She remained active in the WILPF in fighting for internationalism and establishment of international laws. In 1924 she presented her Cahiers de la Paix (Notes on Peace) at the Washington congress of the WILPF. During World War II (1939–1945) she was again active. Women obtained the right to vote in 1944 after the liberation of France. Mélin was a candidate for Presidency of the Republic in 1946. Her program called for full civil equality, political and economic of both sexes, and the election of a vice-president of the Republic.

Mélin's feminism became subdued after this. In the last years of her life she espoused utopian socialist views in which she advocated the abolition of wage labor, the equitable distribution of wealth, and peaceful decolonization. Jeanne Mélin died alone of a paralytic stroke on 18 April 1964, aged 86.

== Selected works ==
- Jean, ou A travers la misère, roman ardennois écrit en vers libres, A. Fonsègue et G. Métivier, 1927.
- Lettres à Thalès, 2007.
- Marceline en vacances ou à travers l'amour, A. Fonsègue et G. Métivier, 1929

== See also ==
- List of peace activists
