= Émile Arnaud =

French lawyer and pacifist (1864–1921)

Émile Arnaud (1864–1921) was a French lawyer, notary, and writer noted for his anti-war rhetoric and for coining the term "pacifism".

Arnaud was born in 1864 in La Chapelle-de-Surieu, France.

Arnaud succeeded Charles Lemonnier as president of the "Ligue Internationale de la Paix et de la Liberté" (International League for Peace and Freedom), which had been founded in 1867. In 1901 he codified his beliefs into a treatise entitled the Code de la Paix, outlining and defining the goals, political positions and methodology of the Peace movement in general. He described this new political movement as "pacifism", setting it up as a counterbalance to the belligerence of emerging political ideologies such as socialism and anarchism. He advocated humanism, charity and tolerance, non-violent conflict resolution and reaching mutually beneficial political solutions through establishing consensus. Emile was a speaker at the second Universal Peace Conference which was preceded by a service at St Paul's Cathedral.

When France entered World War I in 1914 Arnaud volunteered for military service, even though over age, and ended the war with the Croix de guerre.

He died in 1921 in Paris at the age of about 57.

== Publications ==
- L'organization de la paix . Berne: Bureau international de la paix, 1899.
- "Code de la Paix", in: L'Indépendance belge, 1901.
- Le Pacifisme et ses détracteurs . Paris: Aux bureaux de la Grande Revue, 1906.

== See also ==
- List of peace activists
