= Günther Dehn =

German pastor and theologian

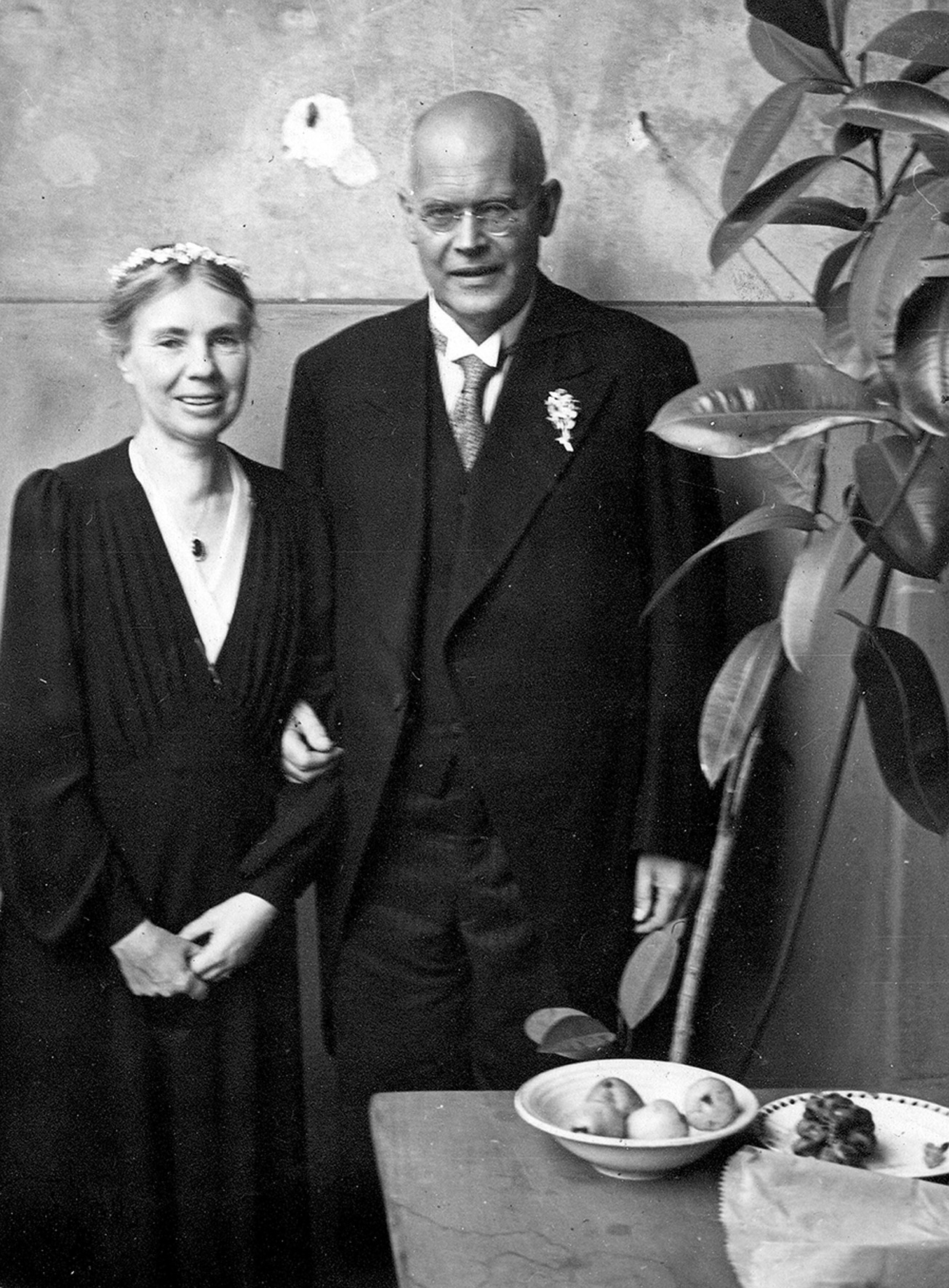
Günther Dehn with his wife Luise

Günther Dehn (18 April 1882 in Schwerin, Germany – 17 March 1970 in Bonn) was a German pastor and theologian. He was an illegal instructor in the Confessing Church, and, after 1945, he was a professor of practical theology. Dehn was one of the first victims of Nazi campaigns against critical intellectuals in the Weimar Republic. He was a Christian socialist in the tradition of Christoph Blumhardt, Hermann Kutter, and Leonhard Ragaz.
