= Blumhardt =

Blumhardt is a German surname. Notable people with the surname include:

- Christoph Blumhardt (1842–1919), German Lutheran theologian and founder of Christian socialism in the region
- Doreen Blumhardt (1914–2009), New Zealand potter
- Johann Blumhardt (1805–1880), German Lutheran theologian
