= Kathleen Innes =

British Quaker, educator, writer and pacifist

- Born: Kathleen Elizabeth Royds; 15 January 1883; Reading, Berkshire, England
- Died: 27 March 1967 (aged 84); Andover, Hampshire, England
- Other name: Kathleen E. Innes
- Occupations: educator, writer, peace activist
- Years active: 1911–1948

Kathleen Innes (15 January 1883 – 27 March 1967) was a British Quaker, educator, writer and pacifist, who served as the joint chair of the international headquarters for the Women's International League for Peace and Freedom (WILPF) from 1937 to 1946.

== Early life ==
Kathleen Elizabeth Royds was born on 15 January 1883 in Reading, Berkshire, England to Sarah Anne (née Spicer) and William Alexander Slater Royds. Her family were Quakers and her father was a physician. His father, Reverend Thomas Royds, was a legatee of her great- grandfather, Thomas Royds of Greenhill, who made his fortune from the Lancashire cotton mills.

In 1895, the family moved to St Mary Bourne, a village in Hampshire with Roman and Saxon roots, which sparked her growing interest in history. Her mother, Sarah, was very involved with the work of the church and all six of the siblings regularly attended services. As the daughter of a wealthy physician, she spent her childhood, roaming the area, reading books from her father's library, and was not expected to pursue a career.

Royds passed her Cambridge exams with honours and entered university, the first woman of her family to seek a university education. In 1907, Royds began teaching at St. Katharine's College Practising School to complete her one-year practicum requirement and graduated with her teachers diploma from Cambridge University after completing the year.

== Diploma in literature ==
Royds began teaching at the Wycombe House School in Brondesbury in 1910. Wishing to further her own education and being barred from attaining a degree because of Cambridge's restriction on women, she enrolled at Cresham College to prepare for the entrance examinations of the University of London. After completion of four semesters, which were supervised by William Henry Hudson, she obtained a chancellor's diploma in literature from London University and as valedictorian in her class received both the Gilchrist Medal and the Churton Collins Memorial Prize.

== Biographer of Samuel Taylor Coleridge and Elizabeth Barrett Browning ==
In 1911, she published a biography and critical analysis of Samuel Taylor Coleridge, Coleridge and His Poetry. The following year, she published a similar treatment for Elizabeth Barrett Browning, Elizabeth Barrett Browning & Her Poetry. Both of these works were encouraged by William Henry Hudson, who continued to serve as a mentor for Royds, securing a position for her as an assistant marker for London University Extension lectures. While still working and publishing, Royds continued her studies and in 1912, after a thirty-six-hour examination in English and German literature and language, she earned her BA degree with class II honours in modern languages.

After completing her schooling, Royds began teaching in a private girls schools such as women's high schools in Andover, Hampstead, Hendon, and Highfield, as well as the Jersey Ladies College.

== Service in World War I ==
In 1914, while on holiday in Germany, World War I broke out and she made a difficult escape from behind enemy lines by way of Denmark to return to England and her post at Wycombe School. She kept a diary that related the details of her and her colleagues' journey. In 1915, Royds left her teaching post to assist with the evacuation of Serbian refugees. Joining with volunteers from the Scottish Women's Hospitals for Foreign Service (SWH) en route to Salonika, she was hired as an orderly; however, she was quickly moved into a clerical position because of her skill with French and German. She also studied Serbian, becoming indispensable to her unit because of her multi-lingual ability, working as a go-between with the SWH and Serbian Relief Fund (SRF) workers.

At the end of 1916, Royds decided not to reenlist with the SWH. Instead, she contracted directly with the SRF and was sent to a small refugee camp at Ucciani, where she remained until the end of 1917. She wrote of her experiences in relocating Serbs to Corsica in an article, With the Serbians in Corsica which was originally published in The Contemporary and reprinted in Maclean's Magazine in Canada. Another relief project in which she participated in was the collection of rubber teats for infant feeding to be sent to Germany. For her relief work, she was awarded the Order of St. Sava from Serbia.

Upon her return to England, Royds took employment in Birmingham, but remained only until May 1918 when she was offered full-time employment in London. Because of her father's illness and subsequent death, she was unable to go with the British Relief to Serbia.

== Post-war pacifism ==
The war pushed her toward pacifism, and Royds joined the Women's International League for Peace and Freedom (WILPF) and the League of Nations Union (LNU). She also joined the Union of Democratic Control as a part-time paid organiser and within a few months was hired in 1919 as the full-time secretary of the WILPF's London office.

In 1921 Royds married George Alexander Innes, a fellow relief worker whom she had met in Salonika. Soon after her mother's death in 1922, the couple relocated to Lewes in Sussex, where George worked as a partner in an engineering firm. Innes resigned as the London secretary of WIPF, but the organisation made her a board member to keep from losing her skill, necessitating monthly trips to London. In 1924, when his partnership ended, the couple returned to London.

In the 1920s, Innes was active in promoting peace, serving as the referent for the League of Nations, on the Board of the London chapter of WILPF, and as the secretary of the Society of Friends' Peace Committee. She continued to publish works, though on internationalist ideals of the League of Nations, including: The Story of the League of Nations (1925), How the League of Nations Works (1926), The League of Nations and the World's Workers (1927), The Reign of Law (1929) and The Story of Nansen and the League (1932). By the early 1930s, she was serving as an honorary secretary of the London WILPF and was a proponent of using sanctions as a means to prohibit war.

In 1927, Innes was elected to serve as vice chair of the London WILPF and remained in that capacity until 1934, when she became chair. Simultaneously, from 1926 to 1936, she served as secretary of the Society of Friends' Peace Committee. In 1937, she succeeded Cornelia Ramondt-Hirschmann as one of the three joint co-chairs of the international WILPF and served through the duration of World War II along with Gertrude Baer and Clara Ragaz.

== Literary work and affiliation with the BBC ==
During this same time frame, she published book reviews and articles in a variety of Quaker journals including The Friend, The Wayfarer and The World Outlook. The reviews were primarily of literature which dealt with internationalist themes and social movements, including histories of peace and suffrage movements; biographical articles of Gandhi, Florence Nightingale, Alfred Nobel and others; and travel narratives, like Through the Caucasus to the Volga by Fridtjof Nansen. At the same time, she travelled throughout England giving lectures and radio presentations not only for peace, but also as part of a BBC program Broadcast to Schools and lectured on scriptural interpretation of the role of women in society, believing women as capable as men in negotiations. She did not believe that morally reprehensible actions could justify patriotism and felt that all human life was important, following an anti-imperialist stance.

== Promoting self-governance for Africans ==
Given the time frame, Innes' anti-segregationist ideas were radical, but she supported the ability of Africans to "rationally" govern themselves. She published Peacemaking in Africa (1932), which argued for a disinterested third party to assist in settling disputes and pointed out that so-called "civilized nations" had armed the Africans, which in turn led to wars.

== World War II activities ==
During The Blitz, Innes moved back to Hampshire and operated the London WILPF out of her home. Until the end of the war, she wrote articles about international politics. When the conflict ceased, she continued publishing, writing local histories about the Hampshire area and some biblical stories.

== Death and legacy ==
Innes died on 27 March 1967 from colon cancer in Andover, Hampshire, England. Some of her literary criticisms and her Hampshire history continued to be reprinted into the 1980s.

== See also ==
- List of peace activists
