= Mathilde Planck =

German politician and journalist (1861–1955)

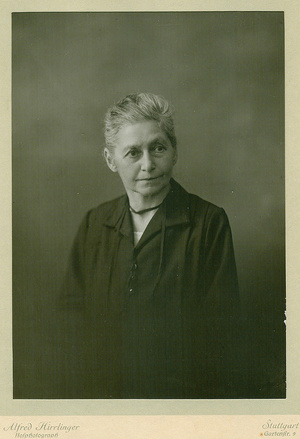
- Born: Johanna Friederike Mathilde Planck; 29 November 1861; Ulm, Kingdom of Württemberg
- Died: 31 July 1955 (aged 93); Gochsen (Heilbronn), West Germany
- Occupations: writer educationalist politician
- Political party: DDP
- Parent(s): Karl Christian Planck (1819–1880); Auguste Wagner (1834–1925)

Mathilde Planck (29 November 1861 - 31 July 1955) was a teacher who became the first female member of the regional parliament ("Landtag") of Württemberg. She championed education for girls and is considered to be one of the most important women in the feminist and peace movements in southwest Germany.

== Life ==
=== Family provenance and early years ===
Johanna Friederike Mathilde Planck was born in Ulm, the fourth of her parents' seven children. It was in Ulm that she spent her early childhood, after which the family moved, as her father changed jobs, to nearby Blaubeuren, and then to Maulbronn. Karl Christian Planck (1819–1880), her father, worked as a teacher. As Mathilde grew up he also engaged in a parallel (and apparently unpaid) career as a contrarian philosopher. The children grew up in a milieu of intellectual liberalism. The ideals of 1848 were celebrated: they were encouraged to shun group-think and work through issues for themselves Her father died in 1880 and after she reached adulthood she helped her mother to look after her parents' younger children: the siblings would retain close interdependencies throughout their lives till 1936 when her younger brother, the theologian Dr. Reinhold Planck, died, leaving Mathilde the only survivor of them all. Between 1884 and 1886 she studied at a teacher training college in Stuttgart, passing exams which qualified her to teach English, German and Mathematics. She taught at a private school in Stuttgart till 1899. She then joined her sister Marie in taking a position with the "1st Württemberg Girls' Secondary school" ("1. württembergischen Mädchengymnasium") opened that year by Baroness Gertrud von Üxküll-Gyllenband with royal backing. It was the first girls' school in the kingdom which educated girls up to the school final exam (Abitur) level. The exam was necessary to open the way to a university education, and indeed in 1904 the school sent its first cohort of pupils through to a course of "ordinary" study at the University of Tübingen.

=== Post-teaching career ===
Baroness Gertrud von Üxküll-Gyllenband died suddenly of a heart attack aged just 33 at the start of 1901. While Leontine Hagmaier took over leadership of the school on the teaching front, Mathilde Planck took over the business side of the enterprise. On her teaching career, after fifteen years, she decided the time had come for a change of direction. She became a full time political activist and campaigner for women's rights, and in particular for women to be given the vote. The first decade of the twentieth century was a period of feverish social and political change, and there was a proliferation of women's associations with political and/or philanthropic objectives which gave her a platform. One issue on which she campaigned with particular urgency was what she termed the "sentence of celibacy", the convention whereby female teachers, if they married, were expected to resign their teaching jobs in order to devote themselves to their family duties. Those whose vocation to teach was "too strong" were therefore condemned by convention to the single life.

=== Campaigner and journalist ===
From 1890 she had been chair of the Stuttgart branch that had been founded by Baroness Gertrud von Üxküll-Gyllenband of the "Association for Women's Education and Study" ("Verein Frauenbildung und Frauenstudium"). She was co-founder of the "Württemberg Women Teachers' League", which she chaired between 1906 and 1916. At various times she headed up various other groups such as the Stuttgart Women's Club, a forum and networking structure for members various Stuttgart based women's associations and campaigning groups including the "Abolitionist League" ("Abolitionistische Verein") which campaigned (as it still does) against the moral double standard implicit in government policy on prostitution.

Planck worked as a journalist and contributing editor for the newspaper "Frauenberuf" ("Women's Profession[s]") which in 1898 became the mouthpiece for the most important women's associations in the region. She was also a strident anti-war campaigner. In 1900 she founded the Württemberg branch association of the German Peace Association ("Deutsche Friedensgemeinschaft"). She joined with Frida Perlen, chair of the Stuttgart region association of the International Women's League for Peace and Liberty, to send a telegram to the Kaiser on 3 August 1914, requesting and inviting him to avoid the imminent war. It was a remarkable step in the climate of patriotic war euphoria which political leaders across much of Europe had unleashed and encouraged over the previous few years.

Nevertheless, after the fighting began she stepped up to her social responsibilities: in 1914 she was a co-founder of the Stuttgart affiliate of the "National Women's Service" ("Nationale Frauendienst"), a cross-party coming together of women's associations, which volunteered to after the incapacitated and their families in the personal crises that afflicted people as a result of the war. This vegetarian non-smoking non-drinking campaigner made a point of wearing the Blue Cross throughout this time as testimony to her (in the context of the war more than usually unfashionable) condemnation of alcohol abuse. She also belonged to the German branch of the "World's Woman's Christian Temperance Union" (WWCTU / "Weltbund Christlicher Abstinenter Frauen"), although she appreciated the "it would not make a person popular in Germany [to] speak out on certain evils that people preferred to keep hidden". She nevertheless was not dogmatic, readily acknowledging that even "people who serve an ideal still have their own weaknesses". She "honoured Mahatma Gandhi and Christ equally".

=== After the war ===
War ended in November 1918. Mathilde Planck was one of many for whom a new chapter opened. She was elected to the Constitutional Assembly for Württemberg, the body mandated to create a new political structure in the territory for the post-war republican reality. In 1920 she was elected to the assembly's successor body, the regional parliament (Landtag). Her priorities were the prevention of future war and avoidance of the accompanying destitution and destruction. Keen to back these aspirations with democratic underpinnings, she worked for a liberal future, with jobs for women able to benefit from equal legal rights and a more prominent role in public life. Planck had been a member of the Democratic Party (Deutsche Demokratische Partei / DDP) from its inception. The party's liberal leftist philosophy, masterminded by the pastor-politician Friedrich Naumann and others, reflected her own beliefs and aspirations. In the Landtag she participated prominently in backing support for orphans and the fight against alcohol abuse, also speaking out against "state backing of prostitution", backing a more liberal sentencing policy for convicted criminals and a more liberal and imaginative approach to school education. Between 1920 and 1924 she sat as a member of the parliamentary finance committee. She remained a Landtag member during the next term, serving as a member - and at one stage the chair - of the important petitions committee between 1924 and 1928. Her contributions in debates were marked by well grounded fact-based presentation and powerful conviction which, backed by her important political contributions outside the parliament, won her a respectful response in the overwhelmingly male assembly.

In order to open up her political ideas to women not involved in politics she also worked as a journalist. Between 1921 and 1927 she was a contributing editor to the women's section of the Stuttgarter Tagblatt (daily newspaper). She also contributed to the women's journal "Frauenwacht". She was involved in setting up the Women's Studies department at the Volkshochschule (city academy) in Stuttgart and was herself engaged in lecturing on legal and political themes as they affected women.

By 1928, aged nearly 70, she had stepped back from politics and directed her energies increasingly to the desperate shortage of social housing. As far back as 1921, with Georg Kropp, she co-founded the so-called Gemeinschaft der Freunde (GdF) (literally: "Society of friends") which later evolved to become Germany's first mutual building society, the Wüstenrot Bausparkasse. Backed by the German Retirement Homes Association ("Deutsche Altersheimverein") and that building society, in 1929 she was involved in construction of the first "modern retirement home" in Ludwigsburg. It was named after her. In 1930 she moved away from Beuren, where she had lived since 1919, to the retirement home she had "built", devoting herself to the management of the building.

=== Nazi years ===
The Nazis took power in January 1933 and lost little time in transforming Germany into a one-party dictatorship. Over the next few years the realities of the new order became apparent. Mathilde Planck spent to winter of 1935/36 in Tenerife, looking after a seriously ill friend. While she was away the GdF (building society) sold the building in Ludwigsburg to the national military administration who closed it down. The following statement from the GdF appeared:

"Miss Planck has stepped down as member and honorary chair of the society, because she is bitter over the sale of the over indebted Mathilde Planck House".

She had in fact already resigned from the board in the summer of 1933. There had been a dispute with the city authorities of Ludwigsburg after Planck had "failed" to ensure that a Nazi flag was available at the house and a fitting installed on the outside of the building to enable a flag to be flown from it. Like many involved in the retirement home project, Planck had hoped that the coming to power of the Hitler government in 1933 might prove a short lived affair. The outspoken old lady, with her record of pacifism and her subscriptions to foreign newspapers, was already seen as a potential adversary: the Nazi authorities kept her in their sights.

After the death of her brother Reinhold in 1936 she was the only one of her parents seven children still alive. She now felt a strong sense of responsibility to conserve the philosophical realist "visible" legacy left by her father. She gathered and ordered his papers and made plans to set up a "Karl Christian Planck archive". For this purpose she had a house built on the Gerlingen heath near Stuttgart, where she worked on the papers and began work on a biography of her father which she would eventually publish only in 1950. She later mused ruefully that she had reached a point in her life at which there was not so much else to do. "I always rejected Hitler, but was not in a position to do much about it. I was so bereft of ideas that the Stuttgart daily newspapers no longer printed anything I submitted". The "triumph of the base, the ugly and the mean" often drive her to the edge of melancholy because she had to experience how "self reliance, and fighting for what is good and beautiful" became increasingly difficult with her advancing years. In 1947 she celebrated the collapse of the "horror regiment" ("Schreckensregiment") with two small written contributions, intended to demonstrate "the great importance of a system of law that matches up to the real simple realities of human rights".

=== Honoured in the Federal Republic ===
In order to avoid the loneliness of what had become a "difficult" neighbourhood, she moved again in 1950 from her Gerlingen home, back to Ludwigsburg. She had by this time lived long enough to become a national treasure. Her ninetieth birthday in 1951 was celebrated nationally through an Order of Merit award. In his accompanying "Greeting address" the West German president expressed appreciation for her "truly patriotic and humanitarian work to which [she] as daughter and spiritual heir of a remarkable father had dedicated her life".

Mathilde Planck died during the traditional summer break, on 31 July 1955 while visiting her nephew, Walter Planck and his wife Lisbeth at their parsonage home in Gochsen (near Heilbronn).

== Veteran candidate ==
In the 1953 West German election attention focused on the advanced age of the CDU leader and German chancellor, Konrad Adenauer, aged 77. However, Adenauer was far from being the oldest candidate. That honour fell to Mathilde Planck, a few months short of her ninety-second birthday and representing the Christian-Pacifist All-German People's Party ("Gesamtdeutsche Volkspartei" . GVP). Unlike Adenauer she failed to secure a seat in the Bundestag (national parliament), however. This was not her first attempt to secure election to the national parliament: she had been an unsuccessful DDP candidate in the Reichstag elections of 1919 and 1920.
