= Georg Kropp =

German journalist and polymath

George Kropp
- Born: 1 December 1865; Swinemünde (since 1945 Świnoujście), Pomerania, Prussia
- Died: 21 January 1943 (aged 77); Wüstenrot, Gau Baden, Germany
- Occupation(s): sales representative (pharmaceuticals) journalist/author building society pioneer
- Spouse(s): 1. Marie Wulff; 2. Pauline Burk
- Children: 2d, 1s
- Parent(s): Karl Kropp; Pauline Stegemann

Georg Kropp (1 December 1865 – 21 January 1943) was a German journalist and polymath. In 1921, with Mathilde Planck, he co-founded the Gemeinschaft der Freunde (GdF) (literally: "Society of friends") which a few years later became recognised as Germany's first mutual building society, the Wüstenrot Bausparkasse.

== Life ==
=== Provenance and early years ===
Georg Kropp was born in Swinemünde on the Pomeranian north coast. Karl Kropp, his father, was a ship's captain, and as a boy Georg was keen to follow his father into that profession, but in 1880 his father, in charge of the sailing barque, "Lessing", was caught in a violent storm and became stranded in the Kattegat. Karl Kropp was blamed for the accident. He never captained another ship, instead embarking on a land-based career, opening a drug store. There is speculation that the rapid switch from sailing ships to steamboats was one reason that Kropp senior, like many ships' captains of his generation, did not wish to continue his career at sea with the new technology.

=== Pharmacy ===
Respecting his father's new career choice, and in compliance with his father's wishes, Georg Kropp embarked on a traineeship for a career in the drugs sector. Initially he worked in his father's shop at one end of the main market place in Swinemünde, then successfully completing his apprenticeship at the Drugs Wholesaler operated by Theodor Pée at nearby Stettin. During 1887/88 he spent two semesters as a student at the German Drugist Academy ("Deutsche Drogisten-Akademie") in Braunschweig. He emerged in 1888 with an exceptionally high grade. He then worked successively as a commercial representative for a pharmaceuticals company, the advertising manager of a publishing firm and then, in Heilbronn, as the editor-in-chief of a specialist journal.

=== Marriage and family ===
In 1893 or 1895 (sources differ) George Kropp married Marie Wulff, a cousin. The marriage produced three recorded children, a son and two daughters. 1895 was also the year in which Karl Kropp died. His son gave up the family drug store and the growing family relocated several times, apparently in connection with Georg Kropp's work. They lived successively in Mannheim, Heidelberg and Heilbronn.

=== War ===
At Heidelberg Kropp entrolled as a "guest student", attending lectures in Chemistry and Physics. He was also a great lover of nature, deeply interested in mushrooms and toadstools, and an active member of the International Organisation of Good Templars. During the First World War which broke out in July 1914 he worked initially as a war reporter. Later he worked as a sales representative for a pharmaceuticals company and as a copy-writer specialising in pharmaceutical products. He was also a Methodist lay preacher.

=== Society of friends ===
From 1919 Kropp was living in Wüstenrot, just outside Heilbronn. In 1920 he published his book "Aus Armut zum Wohlstand" ("From Poverty to Prosperity") in which he first set down his proposals for a form of savings institution to support house building. On 22 July 1921 the founding meeting of the Wüstenrot Gemeinschaft der Freunde (GdF) (literally: "Wüstenrot Society of friends") took place, and the institution was registered at Heilbronn on 17 August 1921. Founder members included Mathilde Planck the first woman to serve in the regional parliament ("Landtag") of Württemberg, and Robert Ankele, the Württemberg postmaster. It is not known how Kropp and Planck had first met: there is speculation that they knew each other because of a shared commitment to alcohol abstinence. Kropp and Ankele had known each other since 1905 because of their work together on behalf of alcoholism victims. During the first few months 96 savers invested more than 100,000 Marks. The timing of the GdF launch was nevertheless terrible, as its founders were quick to recognise. Inflation and currency collapse led to major losses which Kopp paid for out of his own assets. The activities of the GdF were suspended in May 1922. Savers were reimbursed so that none suffered crippling losses as a result.

Remarkably, Kropp continued to believe in the concept. Indeed, he resigned his position with the Heilbronn publishers for whom he had worked since 1918 in order to have more time to work on his ideas for a "building society". As the currency began to stabilise, on 16 February 1924 a meeting took place at the "Silbener Hecht" ("Silver Pike") alcohol-free restaurant in Stuttgart. Kropp was able to persuade Mathilde Planck, Robert Ankele and other sceptical members of his plans for a relaunch of the "Bausparkasse" ("Building savings bank"), this time to be backed by a news publication. The first edition of "Mein Eigen-Heim" ("My own home") appeared in April 1924. In it Kropp explained how the new savings scheme would work, and set out various plausible cash/savings projections for members. He proposed a contract between each saver and the savings bank whereby savers would regularly pay in an agreed fixed amount, and receive interest on savings at the rate of 3%, and that the savers would thereby become entitled to a house-loan of an agreed amount. Savers should be placed in year groups. As soon as the savings for a year group reached a predetermined level, it would be determined through a form of annual lottery which savers should be entitled to receive their house loan. The loan interest rate would initially be set at 7% but it would gradually be lowered to 5% as the outstanding balance was reduced. The exercise would be repeated annually until all members of a year group had received their loans.

Lessons had been learned. This time the founders agreed to convert their GdF into a limited liability entity (though it is not clear from sources whether this was done in 1924 or only a few years later). Kropp's enthusiasm and communications skills had their effect and the Gemeinschaft der Freunde (GdF), supported by Kropp's careful preparation and a less adverse economic backdrop than three years earlier, was a success. The first investor was a senior railway inspector, Johannes Rau, the Heidenheim station master, who joined up on 7 April 1924. His target house price was 12,000 Marks, and he agreed to save 30 Marks monthly (equivalent to 3% of the overall house price per year) towards the "house deposit". By the end of 1924 the GdF Bausparkasse had concluded 916 savings contracts worth, in aggregate, 14.3 million marks. Kropp kept careful statistics. The largest group of members, representing 37% of the total, could be classified as "officials" ("Beamte" - teachers, rail workers, policemen, tax and bank officials, court officials and career soldiers). 20% were Commercial and senior office employees. The third largest group, representing 16%, consisted of workers and commercial employees – probably including salesmen. The self employed represented 12% These included doctors, businessmen, pharmacists, artists, journalists and master builders. The overall data indicate a preponderance of new and old middle class occupations, and reflect the wider social trends of the first two thirds of the twentieth century, with a relative increase in middle class numbers. By the end of 1925 almost 10,000 savings contracts had been added. The number of employees also increased rapidly, to 45 by the end of 1925, and to 230 by the end of 1928.

By the time of the 1924 relaunch Goerg Kropp was nearly 60. He worked as editor-in-chief of the house journal "Mein Eigen Heim" and as CEO ("Geschäftsführer") of the GdF. In 1925 he took a step back, resigning his post as CEO and accepting appointment as chair of the supervisory board ("Aufsichtsrat"). In 1930 he opposed the relocation of the head office location from Wüstenrot to Ludwigsburg (just outside Stuttgart) but he was outvoted and resigned his remaining offices with the GdF.

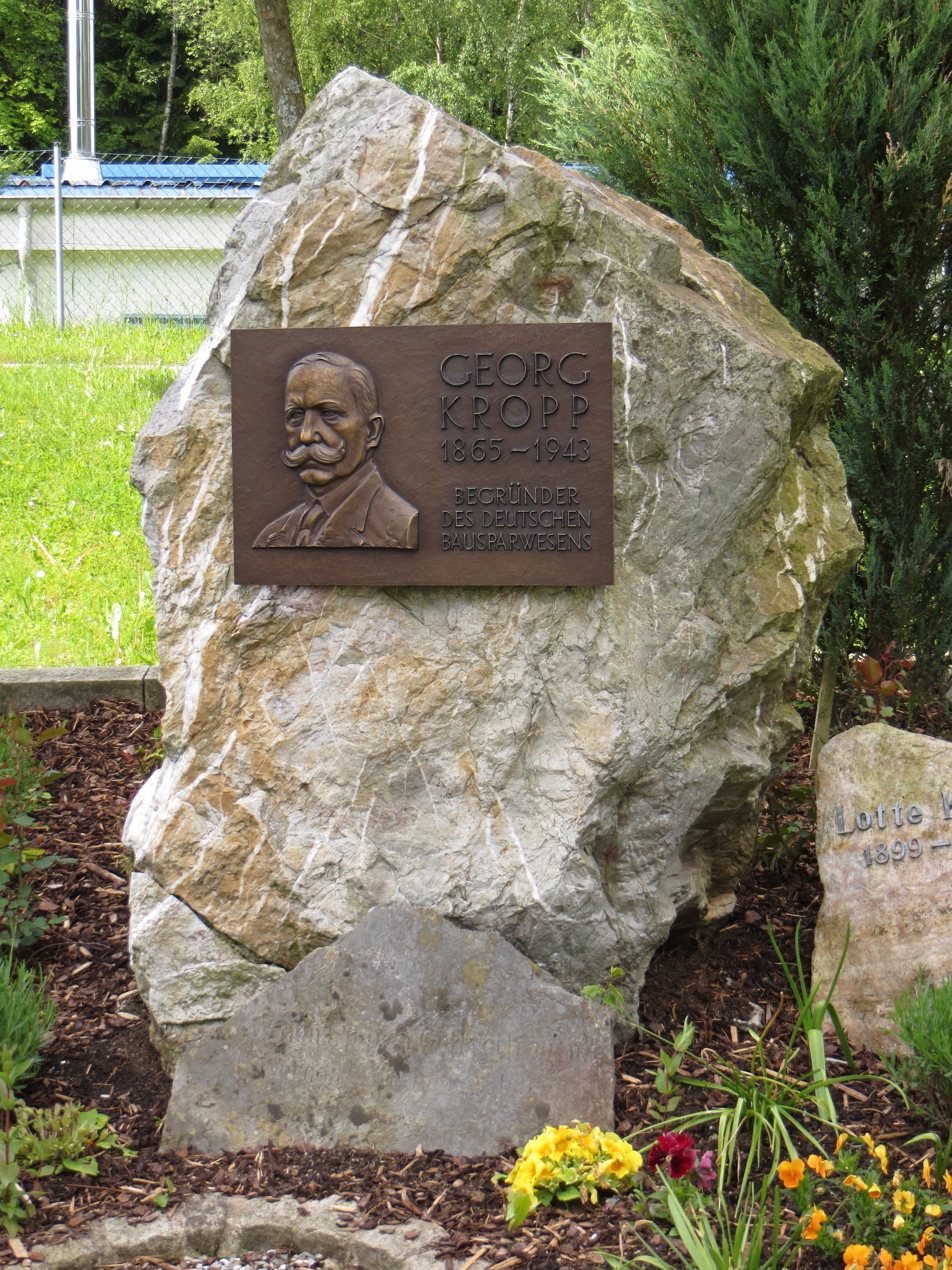
Georg Kropp's honorary grave in the Wüstenroter Cemetery

=== Resignation and final years ===
In his hometown of Wüstenrot he now founded a "Neue Bausparkasse", but this was not a success and had to be liquidated in 1934. Nevertheless, on 1 December 1930 the municipality celebrated his sixty-fifth birthday with an award of honorary citizenship.

Georg Kropp died in Wüstenrot in 1943. He is buried in a place of honour in the local cemetery. His life and work motto is inscribed on a stone tablet: "Wille, Sparen, Gottvertrauen werden Vaterhäuser bauen" (loosely, "Determination, saving and trust in God will build houses for families").
