= Gertrud Baer =

German Jewish women's rights and peace activist

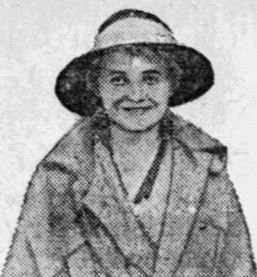
- 1922 Ellis Island detainment photo
- Born: 25 November 1890; Halberstadt, Kingdom of Prussia
- Died: 15 December 1981 (aged 91); Geneva, Switzerland
- Other names: Gertrude Baer
- Occupations: women's rights activist, peace activist
- Years active: 1914–1972
- Known for: International co-chair of the WILPF from 1929–1947

Gertrud Baer (1890–1981) was a German Jewish women's rights and peace activist. One of the founding members of the Women's International League for Peace and Freedom, she served as the executive secretary of the German branch of WILPF beginning in 1921 and co-chair of the international organization from 1929 to 1947. Throughout World War II, though leadership was shared, Baer was the primary leader of the organization. At the end of the war, she became the first WILPF consultant to the United Nations and held that post until 1972.

== Early life ==
Gertrud Baer was born on 25 November 1890 in Halberstadt, in the Province of Saxony of the Kingdom of Prussia to the Jewish couple, Sara (née Stern) and Gustav Baer. Her father, of long-established family from Halberstadt of doctors and teachers. He was a metalwork dealer. Her mother was the daughter of the Chief Rabbi of Hamburg, Anschel Stern, and his wife Jeanette (née Adler). Baer's maternal great-grandfather was Nathan Marcus Adler who had served as the Chief Rabbi of the British Empire and his father Mordechai Baer Adler, who had been the Chief Rabbi of Hanover.

Baer was the oldest sibling in the family, which relocated to Hamburg when she was around two years old. Younger siblings Erna (1892–1967), Walter (born 1894), Harriet (1896–1956), and Jeanette (1903–1944) were all born in Hamburg. Jeanette was murdered at Auschwitz during the Holocaust. She was influenced by her mother's involvement in the German bourgeois women's movement and accompanied her to meetings. At one of those meetings, she met Lida Gustava Heymann and with her, worked at the first women's house in Hamburg. Baer completed her early schooling and trained to be a teacher studying in Hamburg, Leipzig, Munich and Neuchâtel, Switzerland.

== Career ==
Completing her training, Baer began her career as a teacher in Hamburg. During World War I Baer relocated to Munich and became involved with Heymann, Anita Augspurg and Helene Stöcker in the Pacifist Movement. In 1915, she attended International Congress of Women held in The Hague, where the first ideas were launched for women to form the International Committee of Women for Permanent Peace. That meeting was followed-up in 1919 with the formation of the Women's International League for Peace and Freedom (WILPF), which Baer immediately joined, served in various positions with the German branch of WILPF from its founding year. Between 1918 and 1919, Baer set up a women's council in the Munich Ministry of Social Affairs, for the newly created Bavarian Soviet Republic. She also participated in the summer courses on Internationalism, sponsored by WILPF in the early 1920s. Between 1919 and 1933, she worked for the women’s journals Die Frau im Staat (The Woman in the State) and Die Friedenswarte (Peace Watch).

In 1922, Baer, who had been executive secretary of the German WILPF for a year, made her first trip to the United States. She missed her meeting with President Harding, when immigration detained her because of her membership in the Communist Party of Germany and fears that she had insufficient funds to support herself while in the country. Released after the intervention of Jane Addams, Baer, when speaking at a later meeting, urged women to join in the peace movement and anti-war demonstrations. Giving lectures with members from Britain and France, Baer urged the United States to withdraw troops from Latin America, to release political prisoners, and to recognize the Soviet Union. Along with Heymann and Frida Perlen, Baer led the efforts to reconcile German and French women in the interwar period. One such initiative was a tree planting held in 1926 in northern France. Baer also served as vice president of the German Peace Cartel and traveled widely in Europe.

Returning to the United States in 1924 to attend the WILPF International Conference, Baer urged that Hitler be taken as a serious threat. In 1929, she succeeded Jane Addams as the International Chair of the WILPF, but due to the volume of work to be done, it was decided that the responsibilities Addams had carried were to be shared with Emily Greene Balch and Clara Ragaz. When Hitler took over Germany in 1933, Baer fled the country and obtained citizenship in Czechoslovakia. WILPF leadership called an emergency meeting and gave her asylum, hiring her to work full-time to prepare for their next conference. When the Nazis seized and occupied the country, she then fled to Geneva. Upon Addams death in 1935, it was decided to have Baer, Ragaz and Cornelia Ramondt-Hirschmann, continue the shared responsibilities as WILPF chairs. Making her third trip to the United States that year, Baer participated in a disarmament conference, appealing for the nations of the world to work together for peace.

In 1939, Baer, the monitor for WILPF of the Economic Council of the League of Nations, was sent to the United States. The Council had been moved to Princeton, New Jersey and it was deemed necessary for Baer to relocate for safety concerns. From there, she served as the primary leader of the WILPF, throughout the war, preparing the circular communications that quarterly were sent to international branches. The chair was still shared by Baer and Ragaz, but British pacifist Kathleen Innes, had replaced Ramondt-Hirschmann in 1937 as the third member. The three women sent a letter to President Roosevelt urging him to allow refugees into the country. In 1940, Baer became American citizen, though she returned to Geneva permanently in 1950. Having kept alive the contacts and the organization, at the end of the war, Baer became the first WILPF consultant to the United Nations and held that post until 1972. Some of the initiatives she was involved in were urging the World Health Organization to investigate what effect atomic tests and specifically radiation posed to the population. Beginning in 1955, she stressed the need to utilize solar energy, rather than pursue nuclear power, and in a 1960 campaign urged rural education through radio broadcasting.

In 1965, at the fiftieth anniversary convention for the creation of WILPF, Baer expressed her frustration that the organization had moved away from its feminist roots, reminding members that until full equality in all spheres of life had been attained, women would remain at risk. The following year, as an observer to the UN NGO Forum held in Rome, Baer again spoke about the links between feminism and pacifism, while urging self-determination for Viet Nam. At the close of the 1960s, Baer was still committed to the organization, pressing for membership to be expanded to include young people and those outside mainstream organizations. She pressed for disarmament and worked to get the superpowers to agree to passage of the 1968 Nuclear Non-Proliferation Treaty. Ahead of her time in many ways, Baer's ideas preceded both second-wave feminism and the 1980s rebirth of the peace movement. In 1977, a documentary film by Michaela Belger, entitled Gertrud Baer. Ein Leben für die Gleichberechtigung der Frau, für Frieden und Freiheit (Gertrud Baer: A Life for the Equal Rights of Woman, for Peace and Freedom) was released to honor Baer's work.

== Death and legacy ==
Baer died on 15 December 1981 in Geneva. The seminars WILPF holds annually to train new members were renamed in 1981 as the Gertrude Baer Young Women’s Summer Seminars, in her honor.

== See also ==
- List of peace activists
