= Academic grading in Morocco =

Grading system in Morocco is typically a 20-point grading scale, it is used in secondary schools as well as in universities.

In Morocco, formal grades are often misunderstood by graduate programs, leading to discrepancies in acceptance criteria. For example, a grade of 12 is considered a passing grade in Morocco, but it may be interpreted as equivalent to 60% in other systems. In reality, a grade of 13 or higher is regarded as good in Morocco. This misunderstanding can impact the evaluation process for prospective students.

== Grading system ==
The Moroccan grading system ranges from 0 to 20. A score of 20 is, in principle, indicative of a perfect assignment submission and is, along with scores 18 and 19, rarely ever given. Depending on the subject and level, a 16 may be considered an excellent grade whereas in other circumstances a 12 may be considered as an excellent grade. The latter is especially true when it comes to the social sciences or humanities. Most Moroccan academic institutions had an average grade below 10; grades over 12/20 rated the best 10% to 15% of the class.

Typical Grading Scale in Morocco
| Grade | Mention | English Equivalent | US Grade |
|---|---|---|---|
| 19.5 - 20 | Très Bien | Very Good | A+ |
| 18 - 19.4 | Très Bien | Very Good | A |
| 17 - 17.9 | Bien | Good | A- |
| 16 - 16.9 | Bien | Good | B+ |
| 15 - 15.9 | Assez Bien | Fairly Good | B |
| 14 - 14.9 | Assez Bien | Fairly Good | B- |
| 13 - 13.9 | Passable | Satisfactory | C+ |
| 12 - 12.9 | Passable | Satisfactory | C |
| 11 - 11.9 | Moyen | Average | C- |
| 10 - 10.9 | Moyen | Average | D+ |
| 9 - 9.9 | Médiocre | Mediocre | D |
| 0 - 7.9 | - | Fail | F |

== Differences from Western academic grading ==
To illustrate the less obvious differences between academic grading in Morocco and academic grading in the West, consider the grading system in the United Kingdom where the grading brackets dubbed "classes" are separated into First, Second (further divided into upper and lower subclasses), and Third. Similar schema exist in France, Germany, and Spain where a student's performance may be labeled as, for instance, Passable ("Average"), Gut ("Good"), or Sobresaliente ("Outstanding").

The semantic value of these terms are not necessarily equivalent to one another between academic grading systems globally however. Thus, while a designation of "Third Class" in the UK might be said to be "passable" work (as in satisfying only the minimum criteria), it does not hold the same connotation as the Moroccan grade "Passable" (a widely used label that normally applies to the vast majority of passing grades).
