= Frida Perlen =

German journalist and activist

- Born: Frida Kauffmann; 4 April 1870; Ludwigsburg, Württemberg, Germany
- Died: 22 December 1933 (aged 63); Freudenstadt, Württemberg-Hohenzollern, Germany
- Occupations: Women's Rights campaigner Journalist; Anti-war activist
- Spouse: Eugen Perlen
- Children: 1. Karl Hans 1891; 2. Alfred 1894
- Parent: Carl Kauffmann (?-1883)

Frida Perlen (born Frida Kauffmann: 4 April 1870 - 22 December 1933) was a German Women's Rights campaigner, journalist and anti-war activist. During the first part of the twentieth century she fought for gender equality in respect of civil rights. After the First World War she was a co-founder of the "Internationale Frauenliga für Frieden und Freiheit" (IFFF), which became the German section of the Women's International League for Peace and Freedom (WILPF).

== Life ==
Frida Kauffmann was born at Ludwigsburg, a mid-sized town in Württemberg. She was the eleventh of her father's twelve recorded children. (She was a child of his second marriage.) The year following her birth the family relocated to nearby Stuttgart where Carl Kauffmann, her father, and her elder brother, Jakob, together set up an industrial cotton weaving business. Frida was only 13 when her father died. She nevertheless grew up in the comfortable circumstances appropriate to her haute-bourgeois family background, and benefitted from the schooling and general education designed to prepare her for marriage and motherhood. She never undertook the final couple of years at a senior school which, had she been a boy, would have prepared her for university admission.

When she was 19, Frida Kauffmann married Eugen Perlen, a young businessman from Esslingen am Neckar. He was ten years older than his bride, and already a partner in the fabrics shop "Perlen & Cie" in Stuttgart, which Abraham Perlen (1824-1892) his father had established in 1871. The couple's sons Karl Hans and Alfred were born in 1891 and 1894. Both would fight in the First World War. Alfred would be killed in March 1918 in northern France. The older son, Hans, would return from the war alive but badly wounded, and with medals including the "Iron Cross 2nd Class".

Eugen and Frida Perlen were Jewish. By the time the Hitler government took power, in January 1933, Frida Perlen's prominent role as a humanist and pacifist activist and organiser was a matter of record. For reasons both of race and of her political commitment, she became an obvious target for fascist persecution. She fled to Geneva and from there, in April 1933, to Zürich, where a number of her fellow anti-militarists had already arrived as political refugees. In Zürich she stayed for a time with Clara Ragaz, the head of the Swiss section of the IFFF. As the summer drew to an end she returned to Germany, by this time desperately ill. She died on 22 December 1933 at the Freudenstadt sanatorium of Dr. Carl Beer. Some sources state that the cause of her death is not known, but many of her friends abroad suspected that she had taken her own life. Others simply record as a fact that she had committed suicide.

== Political engagement ==
=== A radical in the middle-class movement for women's civil rights and voting rights ===
Frida Perlen engaged actively in the middle-class women's movement from 1904. Within the movement she was regarded as a left-winger or "radical" participant. While moderate members were concerned with establishing girls' secondary schools, Perlen was already promoting the idea of university access for women, and the basic possibility to enter a profession in order to be able to look after themselves in financial terms. She demanded the right to co-determination with men and the right to equality under the civil law. The precondition for that was the right to vote. As a member of the "Deutscher Verband für Frauenstimmrecht" ("... association for women's voting rights"), Perlen also campaigned for that.

The demands of the radical campaigners for women's rights encountered not just from the hitherto privileged men, but also from the women's own organisation, the "Bund Deutscher Frauenvereine" (BDF / "Association of Women's Organisations"), an umbrella organisation for all women's associations, set up in 1894 to represent the combined interests. But the BDF quickly distanced itself from radical demands that might involve reconfiguring social relationships. The leadership of the BDF, dominated by a so-called moderate majority, tended to end up backing the chauvinistic tendencies of the still deeply conservative German state, even while the radical elements demanded a firm commitment to working for international peace and women's suffrage. Several of the more radical women's associations therefore took to pursuing their objectives outside the embrace of the BDF, founding journals and newssheets to provide news of the peace movement and publish articles against war and militarism. For a number of women's rights activists, as the European arms race continued to intensify, the struggle against militarisation and the anticipated international war was an integral element in the fight for women's right. That became the position taken by Frida Perlen.

=== The German Peace Society and the founding of its Women's Association ===
In 1913, while governments prepared for war, Frida Perlen joined the "Deutsche Friedensgesellschaft" (DFG / "German Peace Society"). The society's national headquarters had been located near her home, in Stuttgart, since 1899. Just a few months after joining, she co-founded the DFG's "Frauenbund" (loosely, "Women's Association"). She announced her intention to found it early during 1914, writing in "Völker-Frieden", the journal produced for the Peace Society members. The launch was set for the seventh German Pace Congress, scheduled for May 1914. On consultation with members of the Peace Society's executive board, of which Mathilde Planck was also a member, she teamed up with another pacifist activist from Stuttgart to organise, within the seventh Peace Congress, a one-day "Conference of Pacifist Woman". They succeeded in gaining the support of a number of high-profile backers for their association including Bertha von Suttner, who in 1905 had become the first woman to win the Nobel Peace Prize and only the second female Nobel laureate.

Eventually the launch date for the "Women's Association" of the "Peace Society" was fixed for 24 May 1914, little more than two months before the outbreak of the next so-called "Great War". The founding statutes spelled out that association members were also, automatically, included as "Peace Society" members. At least initially, the "Women's Association" executive worked very closely with the (almost entirely male) "Peace Society" members. As an active member of the "Women's Association", Frida Perlen also sat as a member of the "Peace Society" executive. A carefully targeted public relations campaign undertaken in a desperate effort to rescue the peace met with little success. Women had no right to vote: many were still content to take their lead from men when it came to matters involving national politics. With war fever rampant, especially across the western military "great powers" of Germany, England and France, the efforts of the pacifists were widely seen as a national disgrace. Most women saw it as their duty to stand by their menfolk and call for war.

Faced by this dismal situation, in desperation, on 30 July 1914 the "Women's Association" of the "Peace Society" sent a personal telegramme directly to the emperor, urging him, on behalf of millions of German mothers, to preserve the peace. It reached the emperor's desk only on 3 August. Bertha von Suttner had fallen ill and died the previous month: the telegramme was signed with the names of Frida Perlen and Mathilde Planck. It is believed that the impulse for sending it had come from Perlen. She had taken the idea from an initiative by the "Votes for Women" movement in London who had written to the British Foreign Minister and all the important ambassadors in London urging them to do everything possible to avert the looming "... catastrophe without parallel".

=== Pacifist activism during the First World War, and the breach with the "German Peace Society" ===
The pacifists' appeal was ignored. Enthusiasm for war was unstoppable. But the pacifists never gave up, and continued to try and spread their message through education and publications. In September 1914, "Völker-Frieden" featured an insert entitled "In ernster Zeit" (loosely, "Serious Times") in which the writer, Frida Perlen, renewed the appeal to politically progressive women, and again asked for support. Europe's mothers were called upon not to surrender to the hatred of the war mongering folk, but to stand up both for an end to the war and for women's voting rights.

Political opposition to the war grew progressively between 1914 and 1918, but in the immediate term even Perlen's impassioned appeal in "Völker-Frieden" had no perceptible impact. The BDF resolved to support "our boys in the field", and through its various individual women's organisations, set up the "Nationalen Frauendienst zur Kriegsfürsorge" (loosely, "national women's war welfare and support). The small group of radical anti-war member associations immediately found themselves totally isolated. The government banned antiwar meetings: pacifist statements became criminal offences. Even the "German Peace Society" (DFG), having identified the entire affair as a "Defensive War" ("Verteidigungskrieg") undertook to provide "humanitarian assistance". Within the DFG, however, the "Women's Association", with Frida Perlen on the National Executive, refused to offer "assistance" for the war effort, and stood by their demand for an immediate end to the fighting.

In October 1914 Perlen petitioned the chancellor, calling for an end to the war and an understanding between the governments leading it, irrespective of the war's course. The executive board of the DFG did not support this initiative from their "Women's Association". Meanwhile, the "Women's Association" continued to be intensely critical of the parent society's willingness to offer "humanitarian assistance" in respect of the allegedly "defensive war". The breach between the two came during the early part of 1915, as the "Women's Association" prepared for an International Women's Peace Conference, to be convened at The Hague. The (male) leadership of the DFG rejected the idea of such a conference and banned members from taking part. Frida Perlen refused to be dissuaded, however. As early as February 1915 she was working with Anita Augspurg and Lida Gustava Heymann - both leading German women's rights campaigners and peace activists, but neither of them ever a member of the DFG - on preparations for the German contingent's participation at the conference. The International Women's Peace Conference duly took place at The Hague in April 1915. In the end Frida Perlen was unable to attend, since the German authorities refused to provide her with the necessary travel documents. One suggested explanation for this concerns the resolution which she had already drafted at a preparatory meeting, entitled "Demand for an Armistice" which she had intended to bring to a vote at the Hague Conference.

Despite her being unable to attend, the International Women's Peace Conference was of huge significance, both in terms of influencing post-war politics and in the extent to which it affected Frida Perlen's own subsequent career as a peace activist. Over 1,000 women from 12 countries attended. The largest delegations were from "Great Britain and Ireland" and from Germany. As well as protesting against the "insanity" of the war and calling for an end to the fighting, delegates also insisted that political equality with men should be included on the agenda. A highly professional set of proposals was prepared for the conclusion of a peace treaty and avoidance of future wars. The conference ended with members resolving to continue their anti-wart work in their national organisations and to convene another women's peace conference once the war over. Delegations were then mandated to deliver to the governments of the warring states and off non-belligerent states a paper setting out the conclusions and recommendations of the conference. Not one government accepted the pacifist proposals. Nevertheless, three years later the conference recommendation for a permanent international organisation with its own international court of arbitration for the peaceful resolution of any future conflicts between the peoples of Europe resurfaced: in January 1918 it was one of the "Fourteen Points" set out by President Wilson in contemplation of the anticipated post-war peace conference.

=== The International Women's Committee for Enduring Peace ===
Though prevented from attending the Hague Peace Conference, in Stuttgart Frida Perlen was very much available to play her part in fulfilling the conference resolutions. She continued to try and obtain support from anti-militarist men. On 15 May 1915 she arrived in Geneva where she sought out the (voluntarily) exiled French writer Romain Rolland who had emerged as a high-profile opponent of the war. Highly critical, in his writings, equally of the French and German governments, Rolland urged the politicians not to gamble that they might win. Perlen's meeting with Rolland was not a success, however. In his diary entry that evening the writer unburdened himself on the subject of the "stormy pacifist woman from Germany", whom he recalled in striking, if not particularly flattering, terms as a "stately lady of roseate and choleric appearance". Finding himself under pressure from his uninvited guest, Rolland found himself unable to agree to her proposal that he should place himself at the head of the peace movement in Switzerland.

After this setback, Perlen concentrated on recruiting further allies among women. Together with German pacifist activists Anita Augspurg, Lida Gustava Heymann and Elise von Schlumberger, all of whom had participated prominently at the 1915 Hague Peace Conference, she launched a new appeal to the women of Germany. Perlen herself contributed an article to the pamphlet "Der Weg zum dauernden Frieden" ("The path to lasting peace"), in which, by using a fictitious dialogue, she presented her explanation of what women must do to oppose the war. She was herself convinced that she could create a world-wide coming together of "hundreds of thousands of women", with an "army of mothers" who would take to the streets and create a counter-weight to the male armies of soldiers. The overwhelming numbers of the mothers and women would, she believed, make violence against them impossible, and persuade the men towards a better way.

Because the war started, back in 1914 and 1915, with a succession of spectacular German military victories, Perlen's campaigning attracted little interest and less support among German women, beyond the small proportion who could already be counted as committed to anti-militarism. Women pacifists were, in addition placed under massive social pressure from nationist quarters: activist anti-war campaigners could easily find their lives in danger. Women inclined to nationalism faced calls from the "Alldeutscher Verband" ("Pan-German League") to report these "traitors to the fatherland", in order that they might be charged and punished for their pacifist efforts, their "faffing". Effective government censorship prevented the printing of anti-war material in Germany, while imported material was liable to confiscation. Meetings of pacifist women had to be conducted in secret, and identified as "coffee mornings". It became necessary to develop and apply a secret language. Despite taking every precaution, Frida Perlen found her mail blocked for a period. Her apartment was searched, and she was repeatedly required to attend interrogation sessions. She was nevertheless spared prison, even though she continued to share her views in public and to collect signatures for submission to the chancellor. Somehow, in the face of all impediments, she remained true to her commitments in support of votes for women and peace.

=== Votes for women achieved: for Perlen, politics outside the party structures ===
After the "November revolution", the de facto abolition of the monarchy and the rapid transformation of Germany into a republic votes for women older than 21 suddenly became a reality under the transitional government. In January 1919 women were among those entitled not only to vote for members of the National Assembly, but also to stand for election to it: 36 women successfully did so. Frida Perlen made no attempt to enter what became the German parliament, however. Nor did she join any political party. She took the view that within the existing (male) political parties there was no scope for conducting politics on women's terms. In 1920, she admitted to seeing herself as a "non-party socialist". She believed that Capitalism endangered peace. It was a widely shared view among her generation of feminist activists, who felt they had seen their worst fears confirmed at the Paris Peace Conference (1919–1920).

By the early 1920s Perlen had determined that her future public mission would involve working with other pacifist women to preserve the peace through education and appeal to human reason.

=== The International Women's Peace Conference at Zürich: Co-founder of the IFFF in Germany ===
In May 1919 Frida Perlen was one of 28 German women taking part at the International Women's Peace Conference in Zürich. The post-war peace conference had been planned for at the 1915 conference in The Hague. The idea had been that it should be conducted in parallel with the peace conference convened by governments at the end of the war, in order to provide a platform for the demands of the Women. That would have meant locating the event at Paris, as close as possible to the deliberations of the Peace Conference. However, in the aftermath of the war there was uncertainty over whether the German women would be permitted to enter France, so the location of the Women's Peace Conference was switched to Zürich.

Delegates at the Zürich Peace Conference did not believe that the peace terms "agreed" by the men at the Paris Peace Conference did not provide a suitable basis for a just and lasting peace. It was a document contrived by the militarily victorious powers rather than any sort of negotiated peace. It was for a negotiated peace that the women pacifists had been pushing since the outbreak of the war in 1914. On the other hand, as representatives of the country that was now being widely blamed for the war, the German women pacifists, including Frida Perlen, did not think it would be constructive to criticise the unequal treaty terms in public.

On the other hand, German delegates engaged closely in debate over the League of Nations and its statutory underpinnings. Frida Perlen rejected the version produced by men, which failed to correspond with the pacifist ideals of the conference. Repeatedly the Zürich conference sent textual improvements to the Paris Conference. But the various proposals, which might have created a more durable peace for Europe, were not included in the Versailles Treaty.

As the Zürich progressed it became clear that the task that the International Women's Committee for Enduring Peace had set itself back in 1915 remained unfinished, despite the ending of the First World War. For effective further collaborative work by the women peace activists, the new conditions made it necessary to restructure their own organisation into something more long-term. They therefore established a new agreed constitutional structure and relaunched themselves as the "Internationale Frauenliga für Frieden und Freiheit" ("International Women's League for Peace and Freedom" / IFFF). In Geneva, recently chosen as the home-base for the new "League of Nations", they set up their own international office. At the head, they created a nine-person international committee with a (female) president. In the delegates' various home countries equivalent national organisations, similarly structured, were to be set up.

Perlen herself was centrally involved in creating the German section of the IFFF. She became one of five members of its leadership commission, spread across Germany. She herself continued the international work for peace from Stuttgart.

=== Objectives shared with the IFFF: press officer ===
Perlen found it easy to identify with the objectives of the IFFF. She took charge of the press office and in addition, after 1923, of its commission for the "Fight against waging war with scientific methods", which in 1928 had its title expended with the addition of "...and for disarmament". The focus on "scientific methods", which extended to partner organisations in other countries, had been prompted by growing awareness of the awful and indiscriminate effects of poison gas used in the World War I trenches. As part of a structured anti-war organisation Perlen identified a secure starting position for her own tireless commitment to peace and international understanding between peoples. In this context, she was also an early backer of international school exchange visits and structured "pen pal" contacts. In defiance of the widespread resentment caused by French enforcement of the punitive war reparations extracted by Clemenceau's negotiators at Versailles, Frida Perlen was one of the first Germans to promote and seek reconciliation with France after the war. As early as 1920, she arranged for French IFFF representatives to the Stuttgart premises of the IFFF to appear in public and even permitted them to address joint meetings using their mother-tongue. In 1926, she took part in an IFFF fund-raising campaign to help finance reconstruction of the towns and villages and the recreation of forests destroyed in northern France by the German invasion and the fighting that ensued. As one of the representatives of the German IFFF branch, on 11 February 1926, she traveled to Arras where she met Camille Drevet of the French IFFF and handed over 13,000 French francs for tree planting.

She used her access to the press to generate a wider audience to the numerous concepts for "peace education" elaborated at IFFF conferences. Yet even in the immediate aftermath of war, the mainstream middle-class press were resistant to progressive texts advocating ideas such as banning war-related toys, the abolition of the death penalty or a ban on corporal punishment. Even after four years of suffering and anguish, there was little appetite for rethinking old familiar tropes. Quite quickly Frida Perlen and her fellow activists were subjected to violent attacks. An example occurred at the end of 1920 at Stuttgart's Christmas Market. Perlen herself recorded the event in an article in "Die Frau im Staat", an IFFF-produced magazine. She had been running a "pacifist book stand" which was broken into at night and placed under virtual siege during daylight hours: "So the youth wing of the Alldeutscher Verband had evidently conspired to give us 'a particularly high appreciation' of their mental processes! They arrived in little platoons, mostly of students, adorned with swastikas. What we had to listen to! 'You work to drag the nation through the dirt: your standing here is a disgrace'...". After this, the emerging National Socialist media did their best to stir up hatred against these "twisted" German women. The pacifist activists were all identified as Jewish (correctly, in the case of Perlen), and because of their "internationalism", (Note: Words such as "international" and "cosmopolitan" were dog whistle terms used by the Hitlerites during this period to indicate Jewishness.) fit only to be ostracised in their own land.

Perlen refused to be silenced. A striking aspect of the way in which her pacifist activism developed during the 1920s is the extent to which she continued to build in her international contacts. In 1922, she returned to The Hague, in order to participate at an IFFF world conference held under the banner, "Ein neuer Friede" ("A new peace"). In November 1923, she applied for a visa to visit Switzerland. According to her visa application this was in order to work in Geneva at the international main office of the IFFF. She evidently remained in Switzerland for some time after concluding her business at the IFFF office. She later recalled how much she had appreciated the soothing atmosphere one of the IFFF's regular summer schools, held for the training and education of members.

=== Work for a chemical weapons ban ===
It was at an IFFF summer school on the shores of the "Thunersee" (Lake Thun) that in 1924 Frida Perlen met the Swiss pacifist and biochemist, Gertrud Woker. Woker had recently returned from a congress of the American Chemical Society in the United States, at which she had gained an insight into contemporary developments in chemical weapons warfare. Appalled by what she saw as this abusive exploitation of science, Woker felt duty-bound to spell-out the horrific impact of chemical weapons of mass destruction. The power to kill and maim of chemical weaponry had, she believed, been grossly downplayed by the military establishments in North America and Europe. She compiled a report based on the knowledge she had acquired at the Chemical Society congress and, using it, took various practical steps to share and publicise her concerns. One of those steps was to provide a copy of her report to Frida Perlen, with express permission to publish the contents.

Woker's report formed the basis for Perlen's leaflet "Der Kampf der Frauen gegen die Hölle von Gift und Feuer" ("The Women's Fight against the Hells of Poison and Fire "), published in 1927 in Stuttgart on behalf of the IFFF Württemberg section. She highlighted, in particular, the danger to civilian populations posed by the introduction of chemical weapons. She relentlessly presented the devastating impact of these weapons of mass annihilation, hoping in this way to trigger a more generalised struggle against these weapons and against the developing pressures across Europe for more war.

During the later 1920s the intensifying political polarisation triggered by the Great Depression began to spill onto the streets. Frida Perlen and other pacifists of her generation were ever more marginalised, and to some extent retreated into priviate life. Many younger women, able to take voting rights for granted in the new republic, distanced themselves from the pacifist idealism that had grown out of the horrors of the First World War, perceiving Perlen's generation of feminist activists as man-hating fanatics. Nevertheless, the hardcore IFFF pacifists continued to organise their international conferences and to issue dire warnings about the dangers of future war and the new weapons.

Early in January 1929 the "Conference on Modern War Methods and the Protection of Civilian Populations". A number of celebrities participated prominently, and the conference was widely reported at the time. Members of the conference's "honorary committee" included the writer Romain Rolland and the high-profile physicist Albert Einstein. Frida Perlen, in her capacity as IFFF press commissioner, was among those who had lobbied for Einstein to involve himself. She had also had some success in obtaining trades union participation. One of the speakers at the conference was the Swiss pacifist and biochemist, Gertrud Woker. The conference demanded an end to chemical weapons production, and the topic was duly included in the agenda for an International Disarmament Conference being prepared by the League of Nations.

The League of Nations Disarmament Conference finally took place at Geneva in March 1932. At Frida Perlen's instigation, the IFFF prepared for it by organsizing what became a worldwide disarmament petition of more than six million signatures. In 1930 Robert Bosch and, following a lengthy and very personal exchange of letters. Albert Einstein were persuaded to become two of the first signatories on the German part of the petition. On 10 August 1931 Frda Perlen used the pages of the Kölnische Zeitung to issue a call for people to support the World Disarmament Conference. Thereafter, there is no evidence that she participated further in the build-up to the conference. In January 1932 the National Socialist media launched a dirty campaign against conference organisers, culminating in a major incident at the Munich Hofbräukeller in January 1933, when Nazi paramilitaries disrupted and violently broke up what turned out to be the final major IFFF peace rally, attended by between 800 and 1,000 anti-war activists.

=== Hitler government ban on the Women's International League for Peace and Freedom ===
In January 1933 the Hitler government took power and rapidly transformed Germany into a one-party dictatorship. The National Socialist nightmare would last for twelve years, but on 28 February 1933 the Women's International League for Peace and Freedom (IFFF) became one of the first organisations to be banned by the new government. Members were threatened with "protective custody" and the organisation's assets were confiscated. It was no longer possible for Frida Perlen to continue her work as an anti-war activist. She was not the only member of the IFFF leadership team who emigrated almost immediately.

== See also ==
- List of peace activists
