= Hermann Kutter =

Swiss Protestant theologian (1863–1931)

The Reverend Hermann Kutter
- Born: 12 September 1863; Bern, Switzerland
- Died: 31 March 1931 (aged 67); St. Gallen, Switzerland
- Spouse: Lydia Rohner (m. 1892)

Ecclesiastical career
- Religion: Christianity (Calvinist)

Scholarly background
- Education: University of Zurich
- Influences: Christoph Blumhardt

Scholarly work
- Discipline: Theology
- School or tradition: Christian socialism

Hermann Kutter (12 September 1863 – 31 March 1931) was a Swiss Reformed pastor and theologian. Together with Leonhard Ragaz, he was one of the founders of Christian socialism in Switzerland. He was heavily influenced by Christoph Blumhardt. He combined Blumhardt's expectation of a coming Kingdom of God with a belief in socialist progress. He saw social democracy as a "tool" of the living God, and its followers as unwitting servants of God. He authored 11 books.

== Biography ==
=== Early life and academic pursuits ===
Hermann Kutter, born on September 12, 1863, in Bern, Switzerland, was the son of Wilhelm Rudolf and Maria Albertine König. Raised in a pietistic household, Kutter's formative years were deeply influenced by the religious atmosphere of his family. His academic journey led him to study theology in Basel and Berlin, culminating in a Licentiate in Theology earned in 1896. Ordained in 1886, Kutter commenced his pastoral career, beginning in Vinelz in 1887 and later serving at Zürich's Neumünster from 1898 to 1926. His early inclination towards academia was evident, driven by a desire for a broader understanding of faith and spirituality.

=== Theological contributions and social engagement ===
Hermann Kutter's theological outlook was molded by encounters with thinkers like Christoph Blumhardt and philosophical influences from Kant, Fichte, and Schelling. Notably, his work "Das Unmittelbare, eine Menschheitsfrage" (1902) challenged prevailing theological intellectualism, advocating for a direct experience of the divine. Kutter's engagement extended beyond theology; in "Sie müssen" (1904), he expressed support for social democracy as a divine instrument. His publication "Wir Pfarrer" (1907) cautioned against narrow social pastoral activities, emphasizing the preaching of a living God. However, political differences emerged, leading to a distancing from Leonhard Ragaz during World War I. Despite this, Kutter's lasting impact on dialectical theology and his role as a prominent figure in Swiss religious socialism endure as key aspects of his legacy. In recognition of his contributions, he received an honorary doctorate in theology from the University of Zurich in 1923.

== Philosophy ==
Under the impression of a combination of the Christian expectation of the Kingdom of God, the life philosophies of the time, and the socialistic faith in the future of the younger Blumhardt, as well as the philosophy of German idealism, Kutter reached a dynamic view of God: God, who through Christ penetrates humankind and the world in eternal reality is the only reality of life. With this theocentric theology Kutter paved the way for so-called "dialectical theology" (Karl Barth, Emil Brunner, Eduard Thurneysen). For Kutter, the return to "direct life" is completed in the history of humankind; socialism is a sign of this. But for Kutter this return to the direct is at the same time the meaning and goal of Christendom. For him, social democrats are instruments of the living God; "they must" proclaim to the world the judgment and the great turning point in their service to God, without realizing it themselves. Nonetheless, Kutter never joined the Social Democratic Party (as Leonhard Ragaz and Karl Barth did); neither did he identify the gospel with socialism.

Kutter published a book supporting the German war effort of World War I. Leonhard Ragaz, a pacifist, parted ways with Kutter. In the midst of World War II, Kutter embraced a pacifist Christian stand.

== Pastoral visionary ==
Beyond Hermann Kutter's academic pursuits, his pastoral career and social advocacy were integral to his life's work. Ordained in 1886, he began his pastoral journey in Vinelz in 1887, cultivating a reputation for connecting with congregants. His subsequent move to Zürich's Neumünster in 1898 marked a significant chapter in his pastoral service, where he continued to impact the lives of those he served. Kutter's approach to pastoral care was characterized by a balance between spiritual guidance and a commitment to addressing social issues. In the early 20th century, his work "Sie müssen" (1904) notably expressed his positive stance towards social democracy, framing it as a tool aligned with divine intentions. Additionally, his active involvement with organizations like the Knights of St. John and YMI, along with volunteering for Meals on Wheels, underscored his dedication to community well-being.

== Theological pioneer ==
Hermann Kutter's intellectual legacy extended far beyond his immediate pastoral and social engagements. Inspired by the eschatological ideas of Christoph Blumhardt, Kutter's theological approach emphasized a clear distinction between the Kingdom of God and the worldly realm. His writings, such as "Das Unmittelbare, eine Menschheitsfrage" (1902), were instrumental in shaping early dialectical theology, influencing subsequent theologians like Karl Barth, Emil Brunner, and Eduard Thurneysen. Kutter's commitment to theological renewal and his insistence on the immediate experience of God left an indelible mark on the theological landscape of his time. Despite political differences and theological debates, Kutter's enduring influence is evident in the continued exploration of his ideas by scholars and theologians in the realms of religious socialism and dialectical theology.
