= Johann Blumhardt =

German Lutheran theologian

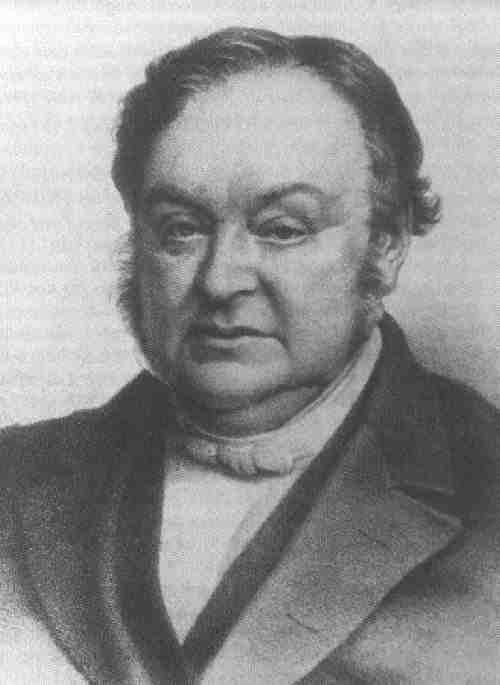
Johann Cristoph Blumhardt

Johann Christoph Blumhardt (16 July 1805 in Stuttgart – 25 February 1880 in Boll) was a German Lutheran theologian, best known for his contribution in thought towards a kingdom-now or kingdom-come theology and his motto and centralization of Christianity around the idea that "Jesus is Victor." Blumhardt was born in Stuttgart, in the Electorate of Württemberg. He was the father of Christoph Blumhardt.

== Jesus is Victor ==
The phrase "Jesus is Victor" (aside from its Latin origin, Christus Victor) originated from his claims to have exorcised in 1842 the girl Gottliebin Dittus in Möttlingen. Blumhardt wrote a book about her two-year-long demonic possession, published in 1850, called Blumhardt's Battle.

His account, which identifies the girl only as "G." for the sake of discretion, describes her possession not only by several demons but mainly by the spirit of a widow who had killed two children and buried them in a field. Blumhardt claims G. was finally freed one night from all her demonic possessions and their manifestations when the last demon to be cast out shouted, "Jesus is the victor!" Although many praised Blumhardt as a hero for performing the exorcism successfully, he said otherwise: "That I don't know, but this I do know; Jesus is the victor."

The event led to a revival in Blumhardt's parish. It was claimed there were many healings, conversions of some of the church's most determined opponents, and radical transformations of life and character. Marriages were supposedly saved and enemies reconciled amidst an outpouring of evangelistic zeal. Blumhardt took revivals on the road and began administering faith healings as well.

In 1853 he purchased a thermal spa in Bad Boll to serve as a Christian retreat mostly for people seeking his renowned healing abilities. He lived and worked there until his death in 1880.

== Legacy ==
Both Blumhardt and his son Christoph, while unsystematic in their theology, had very significant pastoral and theological impact. Their ideas on the perennial breaking-in of God's kingdom from the future helped transform Christian eschatology in the twentieth century. They had particular influence on the work of Karl Barth and Eduard Thurneysen.

== Books ==
- Zündel, Friedrich; Blumhardt, Johann Cristoph (2011). The Awakening: One Man's Battle with Darkness (PDF). Rifton, NY: Plough Publishing House.
- Blumhardt, Johann Christoph (2010). Blumhardt's Battle: A Conflict with Satan over the Soul of a Young Woman. Plough Publishing House.
