= Karl Christian Planck =

German philosopher (1819–1880)

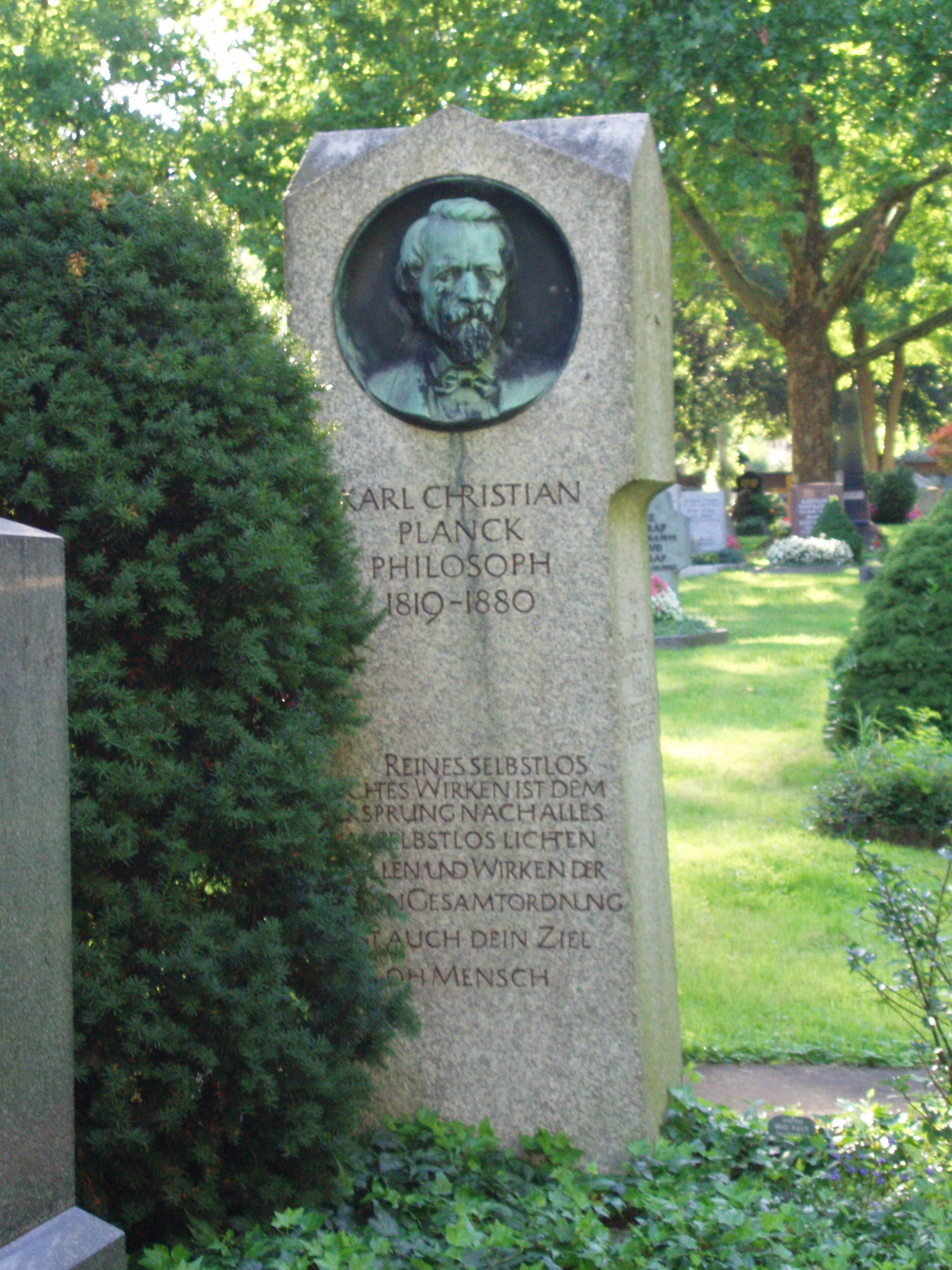
Karl Christian Planck's headstone

Karl Christian Planck (January 17, 1819 – June 7, 1880) was a German philosopher.

== Life ==
Planck was born in Stuttgart. He studied at Tübingen, where he became doctor of philosophy in 1840 and Privatdozent in 1848. During this period the influence of Reiff led him to oppose the dominant Hegelianism of the time.

In 1850–1851, he published his great book, Die Weltalter, in which he developed a complete original system of philosophy, based on the realistic view that thought should proceed from nature to the highest forms of existence in the spiritual life. Not only did Planck oppose the idealism of his confreres; his views were, in another aspect, directly antagonistic to the Darwinian theory of descent, which he specifically attacked in Wahrheit und Flachheit des Darwinismus (Nördlingen, 1872).

The natural consequence of this individuality of opinion was that his books were practically disregarded, and Planck was deeply incensed. The ill success of Die Weltalter nerved him to new efforts, and he repeated his views in Katechismus des Rechts (1852), Grundlinien einer Wissenschaft der Natur (1864), Seele und Geist (1871), and numerous other books, which, however, met with no better fate. In the meantime he left Tübingen for Ulm, whence he came finally to the seminary of Maulbronn. He died in 1880 in an asylum after a short period of nervous prostration.

After his death a summary of his work came into the hands of Köstlin (author of Aesthetics, 1869), who published it in 1881 under the title Testament eines Deutschen, Philosophie der Natur und der Menschheit. Planck's views were elaborately developed, but his method of exposition told heavily against their acceptance. He regarded himself as the Messiah of the German people.

Beside the works above quoted, he wrote System des reinen Idealismus (1851); Anthropologie und Psychologie auf naturwissenschaftlicher Grundlage (1874); a political treatise, Bismarck : Süddeutschland und der deutsche Nationalstaat (1872); and Logisches Causalgesetz und natürliche Zweckmäßigkeit (1874).
