= Wüstenrot =

- Municipality
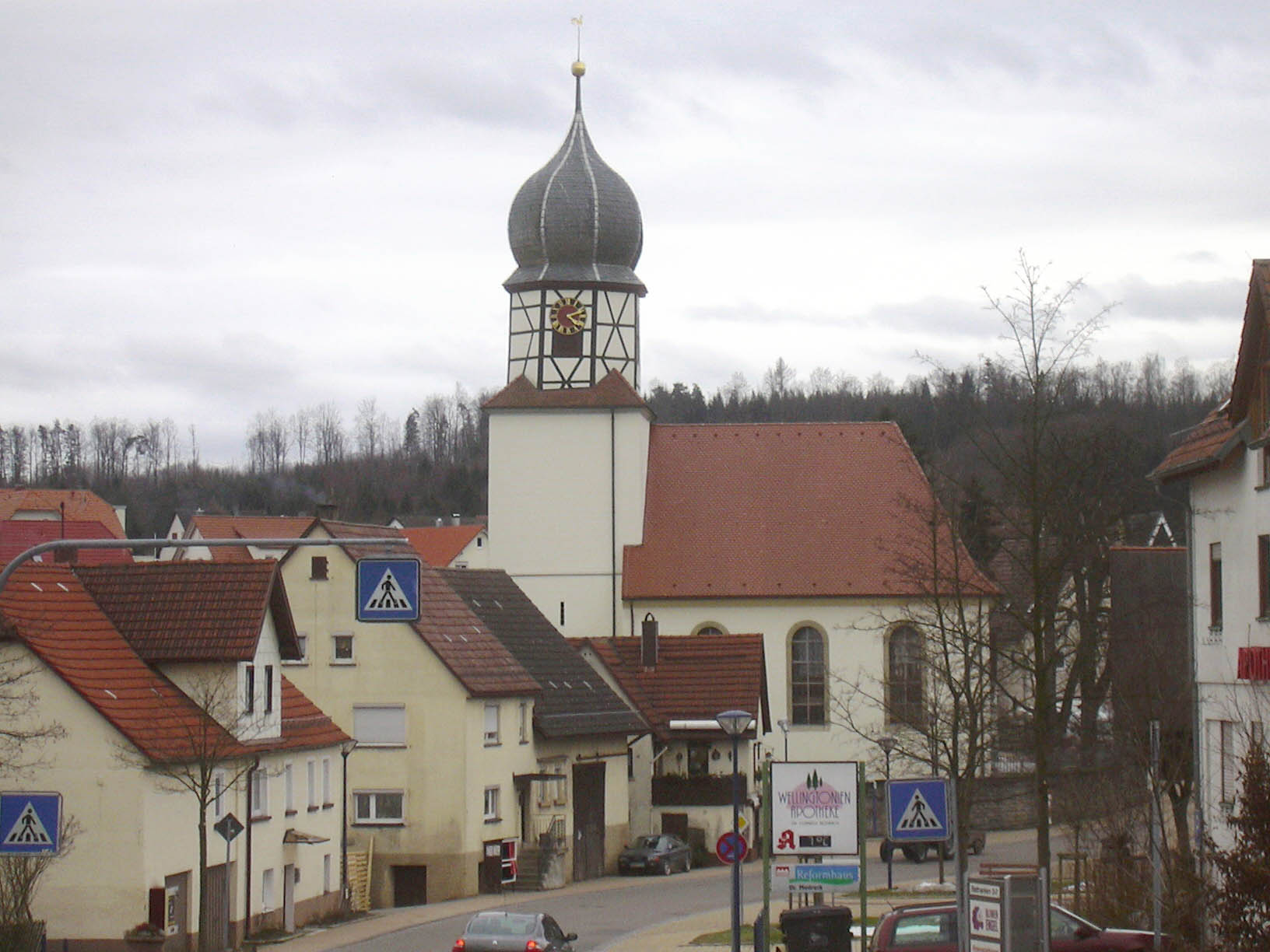
- Protestant Church

- Coat of arms

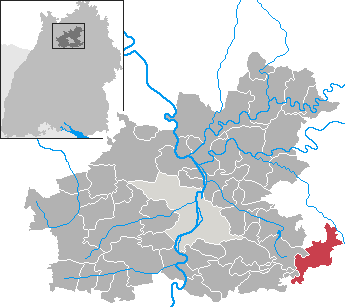
- Location of Wüstenrot within Heilbronn district
- Interactive map of Wüstenrot
- Location within Germany Location within Baden-Württemberg
- Coordinates: 49°5′N 9°28′E
- Country: Germany
- State: Baden-Württemberg
- Admin. region: Stuttgart
- District: Heilbronn
- Subdivisions: 5

Government
  - Mayor (2022–30): Timo Wolf

Area
  - Total: 30.02 km^{2} (11.59 sq mi)
- Elevation: 489 m (1,604 ft)

Population (2025-12-31)
  - Total: 6,674
  - Density: 222.3/km^{2} (575.8/sq mi)
- Time zone: UTC+01:00 (CET)
  - Summer (DST): UTC+02:00 (CEST)
- Postal codes: 71543
- Dialling codes: 07945
- Vehicle registration: HN
- Website: www.wuestenrot4u.de

Wüstenrot (German pronunciation: [ˈvyːstn̩ˌʁoːt]) is a municipality in the Mainhardt Forest with about 6,800 inhabitants, more than half of them in small incorporated villages. The village is the birthplace of the Wüstenrot Bausparkasse (Wüstenrot Building Society).

== Geography ==
=== Location ===
Wüstenrot is in the forest in the southeast of the district of Heilbronn in the natural region of the Swabian-Franconian Forest. The River Rot runs through central Wüstenrot. Wüstenrot consists of the five towns (and former municipalities) Wüstenrot, Finsterrot, Maienfels, Neuhütten, Neulautern and the abandoned village of Neuhütte in Joachimstal.

=== Neighbours ===
Neighboring cities and municipalities of Wüstenrot are (moving clockwise, starting in the west) the towns of Beilstein and Löwenstein (both in Heilbronn), Bretzfeld (Hohenlohe), Mainhardt (Schwäbisch Hall), Großerlach and Spiegelberg (within Rems-Murr-Kreis) and Oberstenfeld (Prevorst district, Ludwigsburg).

The community of Wüstenrot (as of 2006) has 4,971 inhabitants, 2,952 of which in the Wüstenrot proper.

== Mayors ==
- 1974–1990: Ernst Schlagenhauf
- 1990–2006: Roland Awe
- 2006–2014: Heinz Nägele
- since 2014: Timo Wolf
