= Clara Ragaz =

Swiss feminist pacifist

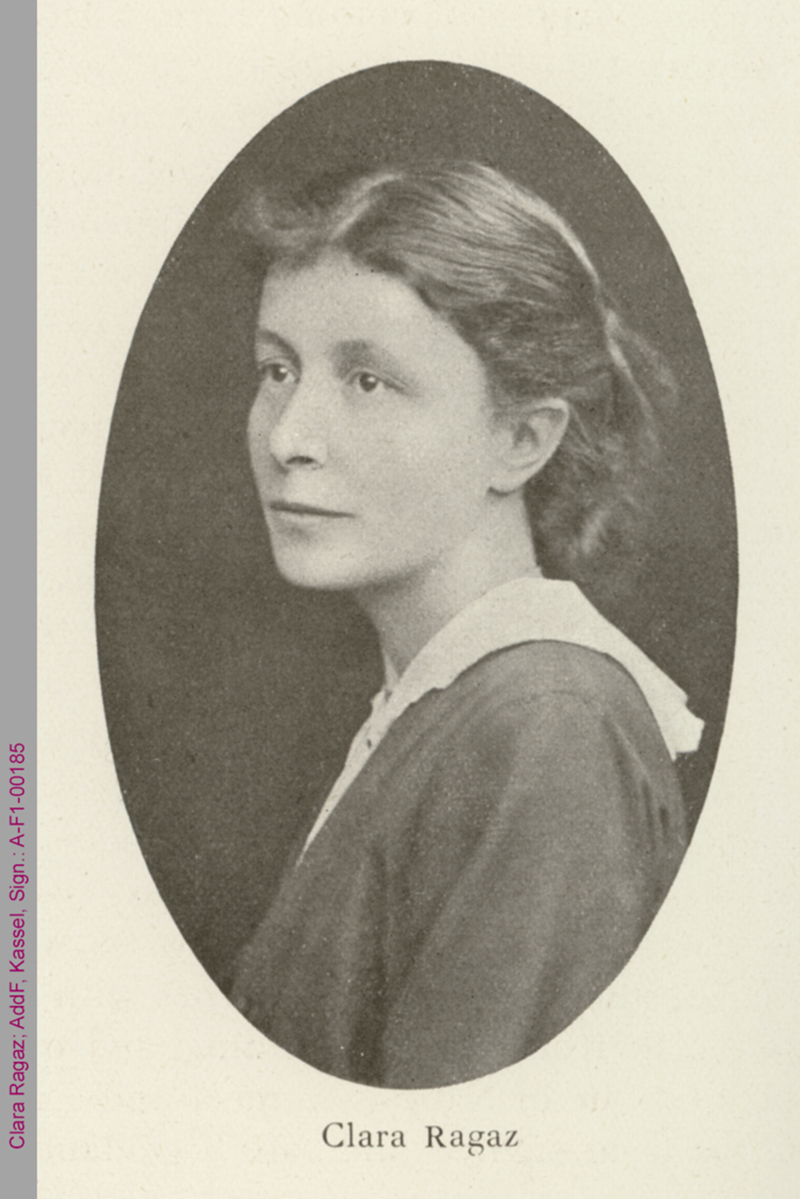
- Clara Ragaz, ca. 1910
- Born: Clara Nadig; 30 March 1874; Chur, Switzerland
- Died: 7 October 1957 (aged 83); Zürich, Switzerland
- Other name: Clara Ragaz-Nadig
- Occupations: teacher, pacifist
- Years active: 1892–1946

Clara Ragaz (30 March 1874 – 7 October 1957) was one of the most noted Swiss feminist pacifists of the first half of the twentieth century. She was a founder of the Swiss Federation of Abstinent Women, an organization that supported the temperance movement in Switzerland. She served as the co-International chair of the Women's International League for Peace and Freedom (WILPF) from 1929 to 1946.

== Early life ==
Clara Nadig was born on 30 March 1874 in Chur, in the Grisons canton of Switzerland to Christina (née Plattner) and Johann Josua Nadig. She studied to be a teacher, completing her training in 1892 at the normal school in Aarau.

== Career ==
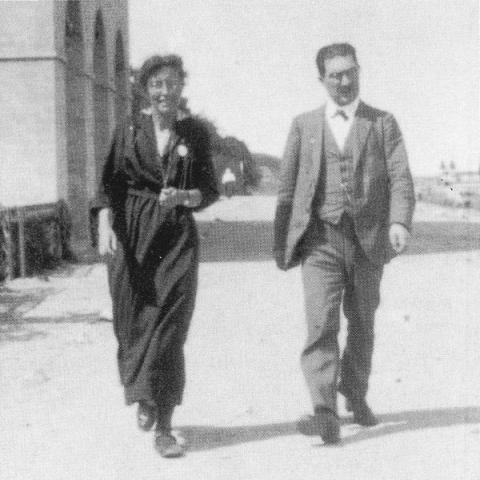
Clara and Leonhard Ragaz in 1923

Nadig first taught in England and France before returning to Switzerland. She taught in a Sunday school and became involved in missionary work, which is how in 1893 she met the social activist Leonhard Ragaz, whom she married in 1901. She took a teaching position in the Engadin valley, while her husband served as the chief Protestant cleric of Chur between 1902 and 1906. In 1902, she was one of the founders of the Swiss Federation of Abstinent Women (German: Schweiz Bundes abstinenter Frauen), an arm of the international temperance movement in Switzerland. In 1907, she joined the feminist organization Union for the Advancement of Women (German: Union für Frauenbestrebungen), when the couple were in Bern and her husband served as a pastor for the Basel Minster. In 1908, they moved to Zürich, where Ragaz continued teaching and her husband was engaged as a professor of theology at the University of Zurich. In Zürich Ragaz joined the buyers' collective known as the Social Buyers' League (German: Sozialen Käuferliga), which aimed at improving the situation of workers through conscious buying methods of consumers, and remained a part of the group until 1915. Together with Emma Pieczynska-Reichenbach she worked towards improving the minimum wage of female workers, shorter working hours, and better working conditions.

In 1909, Ragaz served as the director of the Swiss Home Works Exhibition (German: Schweiz Heimarbeitsausstellung), which featured spinning, straw works, cobbling and other handcrafted items created by women, but also discussed the problems of working women, unsanitary conditions and child labor practices. In 1913, she joined the Socialist Party of Switzerland and along with her husband practiced religious socialism, believing that Christian faith required a social conscience that focused on helping working-class people. In 1915, Ragaz co-founded the Committee for a Lasting Peace (German: Komitee für einen dauernden Frieden) and would serve as its president until 1946. That same year, she published Women in Peace from a talk she had given. In 1919 she played a key role in bringing the Congress of Zurich to the city, which led to the foundation of the Women's International League for Peace and Freedom. The meeting followed on from the 1915 Hague Congress of Women, held by feminist internationalist women seeking to end World War 1. Ragaz was the opening speaker for the Congress of Zurich, alongside renowned feminist Jane Addams. She continued to work with the international WILPF in Geneva. In 1921, she published a translation of Tagore as Educator by Emma Pieczynska-Reichenbach. That same year, her husband quit his university job and the couple moved to the Aussersihl district to live among the workers there. They were committed to the social welfare of the working class and Ragaz began giving lectures at the Social School for Women (German: Sozialen Frauenschule).

Ragaz translated the work Religious Foundations of the Social Gospel by Walter Rauschenbusch, one of his most influential books, into German in 1922. In 1929, Ragaz succeeded Jane Addams as one of the co-International Chairs of the WILPF. Because of the volume of work to be done, it was decided that the responsibilities Addams had carried were to be shared with Gertrud Baer and Emily Greene Balch. That same year, she was appointed as the vice president of the boarding school at the Social School for Women and served in that capacity until 1946. Ragaz, Baer, and Balch, who was later replaced by Kathleen Innes steered the WILPF during the difficult war years, when defending borders and simultaneously advocating an anti-war stance often were at odds. Both she and her husband resigned from the socialist party in 1935 over the stance of national defense. She remained active in the pacifist movement until the war ended.

== Death and legacy ==
Ragaz died on 7 October 1957 in Zurich. In 2015, a lecture series honoring her pacifist work was presented by the Association of Eastern Swiss Women in St. Gallen, Switzerland.

== See also ==
- List of peace activists
