= Jakob Friedrich Reiff =

- Born: December 23, 1810; Vaihingen an der Enz
- Died: July 6, 1879 (aged 68); Tübingen

Jakob Friedrich von Reiff (December 23, 1810 – July 6, 1879) was a German philosopher. He was a student of Ferdinand Christian Baur at the Tübingen School. He taught Edmund Pfleiderer.
