= Leonhard Ragaz =

Swiss Reformed theologian (1868–1945)

The Reverend Leonhard Ragaz
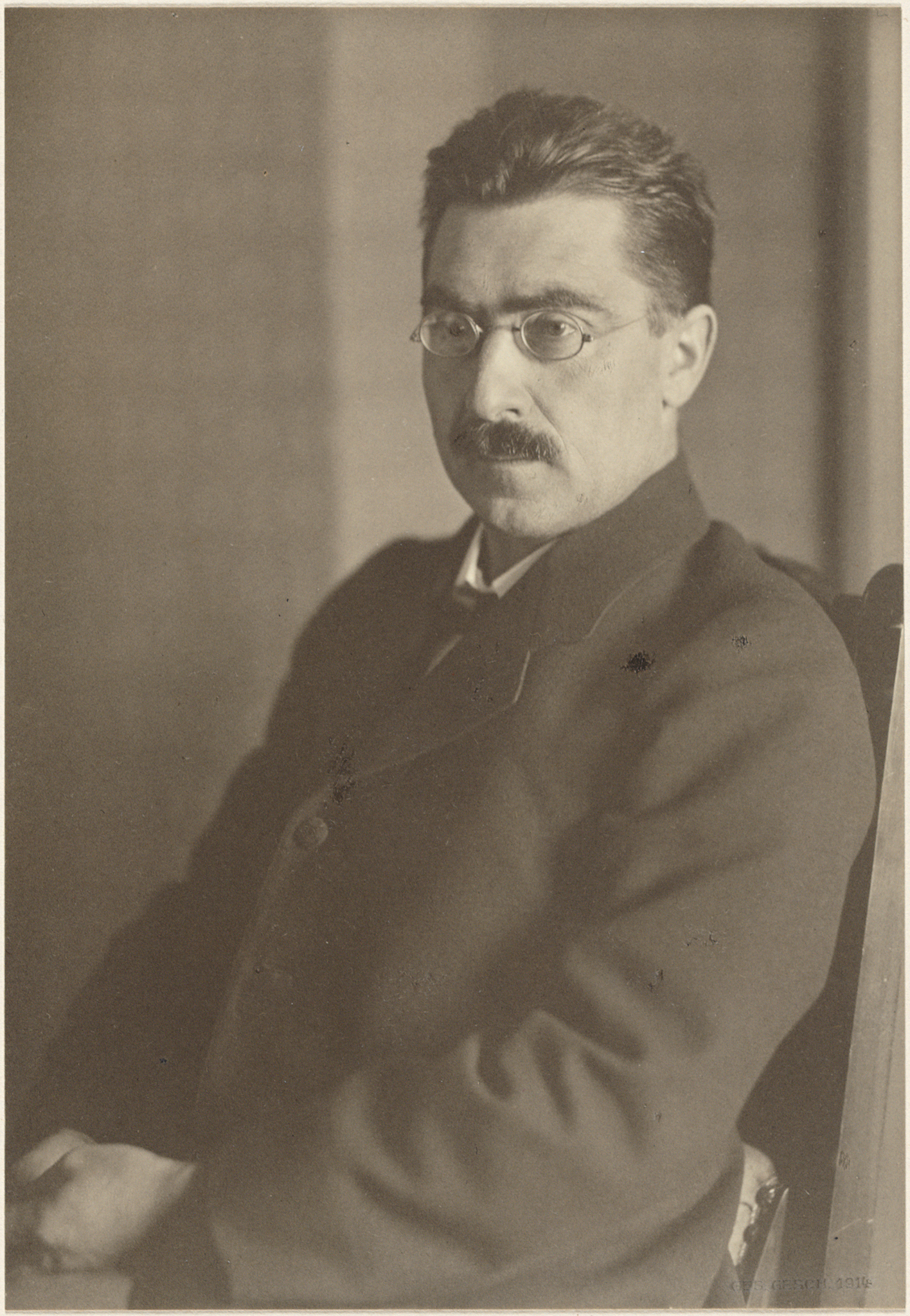
- Ragaz in 1914
- Born: 28 July 1868; Tamins, Switzerland
- Died: 6 December 1945 (aged 77); Zürich, Switzerland
- Political party: Social Democratic Party of Switzerland (1913–1935)
- Spouse: Clara Ragaz-Nadig (m. 1901)

Ecclesiastical career
- Religion: Christianity (Reformed)

Academic background
- Influences: Christoph Blumhardt

Academic work
- Discipline: Theology
- School or tradition: Christian socialism
- Institutions: University of Zurich

Leonhard Ragaz (28 July 1868 – 6 December 1945) was a Swiss Reformed pastor and theologian and, with Hermann Kutter, one of the founders of religious socialism in Switzerland. He was influenced by Christoph Blumhardt. He was married to the feminist and peace activist Clara Ragaz-Nadig.

== Biography ==
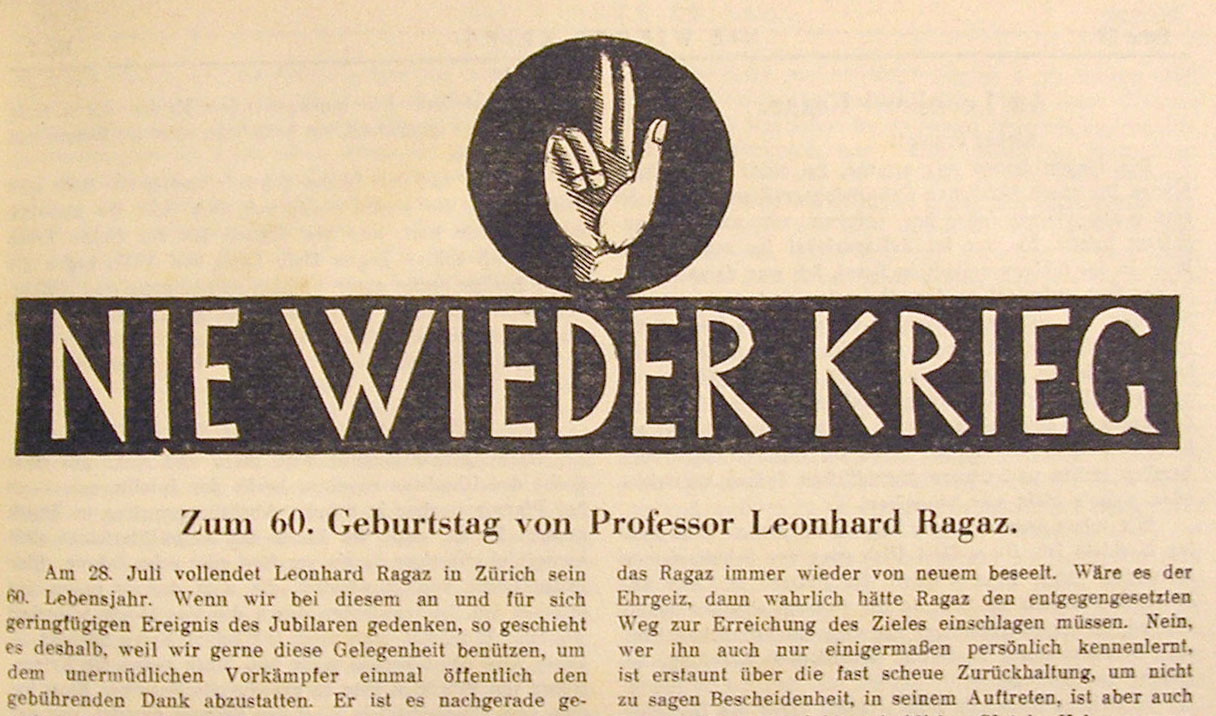
Special issue for Leonhard Rahaz 60 years, Zürich 1928

Born to a farmer family in Tamins, Grisons, on 28 July 1868, Ragaz studied theology at Basel, Jena, and Berlin. In 1890, he was elected as minister in Flerden, Heinzenberg. In 1893, he moved to Chur, working as a teacher of language and religion, and from 1895 to 1902 as municipal minister. In 1902, Ragaz was elected as minister in Basel Minster.

Leonhard Ragaz grew up as the son of a small farming family in the municipality of Tamins. After studying theology in Basel, Jena and Berlin, he became a pastor in Flerden, Heinzenberg in 1890. He joined the Swiss Zofingen Association. In 1892 he took up a position as a language and religion teacher in Chur and was elected parish priest in 1895, and in 1902 he moved to Basel Minster as the second pastor. Here his first book was written, the ethical treatise Du sollst!

In Basel, including reading the works of Hermann Kutter, Ragaz came into contact with the labour movement. As construction workers went on strike in 1903, Ragaz delivered a sermon in his famous masonry watch on the cathedral cockpit "if institutional Christendom were to be cold and incomprehending towards the becoming of a new world, which after all emerged from the heart of the gospel, then the salt of the earth would have become putrid". which came to be known as the "bricklayers' strike sermon" (Maurerstreikpredigt). Since 1906, Kutter and he have collected like-minded people at annual religious-social conferences. In addition, Ragaz gave the magazine with Benedikt Hartmann (1873-1955) and Rudolf Lichtenhand (1875-1947)

In 1908, Ragaz was appointed to the Theological Faculty of the University of Zurich as Professor of Systematic and Practical Theology. He joined the Social Democratic Party of Switzerland in 1913. He was Shocked during the First World War by European Nationalism, he campaigned for the international cooperation of social democracy and helped to prepare the Zimmerwald Conference in 1915. During the Swiss general strike of 1918, he took sides with the workers, when the soldiers guarded the university with their steel helmets and planted bayonets, he protested: "this site had to be protected only because it had given the people stones instead of bread"

In 1921 at the age of 53, Ragaz resigned from his chair because it had become impossible for him to train pastors for the bourgeois Swiss Reformed Church. He and his family moved to the proletarian Aussersihl district of Zürich. He remained involved with the labour movement, editing his journal Neue Wege he was recognised and been added to the International Reconciliation Society to maintain peace, until his death in Zürich on 6 December 1945.

== Religious socialism and pacifism ==
For Ragaz, the Early Church was based on a spirit of cooperation and collectivity. As a consequence, the socialist ideal of self-administered cooperatives owned by the workers themselves was a postulate directly derived from the gospel and the promise of justice in God's kingdom.

Also as a consequence of his Christian belief in justice and peace, Ragaz staunchly opposed the First World War, from a stance of active pacifism: he called for all religious socialists to unite in protesting the war. He taught that if capitalism resorted to force and violence, that was a true reflection of its nature, but that if socialism did the same, it was a treason to its ideals.

Ragaz' main work is Die Bibel – eine Deutung ("The Bible - An Interpretation"), written during the Second World War and published in seven volumes in 1947–1950.

== Works ==
- Du sollst. Grundzüge einer sittlichen Weltanschauung, Waetzel, Freiburg im Breisgau 1904
- Dein Reich komme. Predigten, Helbing & Lichtenhahn, Basel 1909
- Religionsphilosophie, 2 vols., Zürich 1909
- Die neue Schweiz. Ein Programm für Schweizer und solche, die es werden wollen,
- Weltreich, Religion und Gottesherrschaft, 2 vols., Rotapfel, Zürich/Leipzig 1922
- Der Kampf um das Reich Gottes in Blumhardt, Vater und Sohn – und weiter!, Rotapfel, Zürich/Leipzig 1922
- Von Christus zu Marx – von Marx zu Christus. Ein Beitrag, Harder, Wernigerode 1929
- Das Reich und die Nachfolge. Andachten, Herbert Lang, Bern 1937
- Gedanken. Aus vierzig Jahren geistigen Kampfes (anthology), Herbert Lang, Bern 1938
- Die Botschaft vom Reiche Gottes. Ein Katechismus für Erwachsene, Herbert Lang, Bern 1942
- Die Gleichnisse Jesu, Herbert Lang, Bern 1944
- Die Bergpredigt Jesu, Herbert Lang, Bern 1945
- Die Geschichte der Sache Christi. Ein Versuch, Herbert Lang, Bern 1945
- Die Bibel. Eine Deutung, 7 vols., Diana, Zürich 1947–50
- Mein Weg. Eine Autobiographie, autobiography, 2 vols., Diana, Zürich 1952
- Eingriffe ins Zeitgeschehen. Reich Gottes und Politik. Texte von 1900 bis 1945, eds. Ruedi Brassel and Willy Spieler, Exodus, Luzern 1995, ISBN 978-3-905575-56-9
- Leonhard Ragaz in seinen Briefen, eds. Christine Ragaz et al. (letters):
  - vol. 1: 1887–1914, Zürich 1966, ISBN 978-3-290-11187-8
  - vol. 2: 1914–1932, Zürich 1982, ISBN 978-3-290-11469-5
  - vol. 3: 1933–1945, Zürich 1992, ISBN 978-3-290-10869-4
