= Academic grading in the United Kingdom =

In the United Kingdom, academic grading below degree level differs between England, Northern Ireland, Scotland and Wales, as education is a devolved issue. England, Wales and Northern Ireland previously had the same letter-based grading system for GCSEs, until the adoption of a number-based system in England in 2017, and some amendments in Northern Ireland in 2019. Scotland uses separate qualifications and a separate grading system.

== England, Wales and Northern Ireland ==
England, Wales and Northern Ireland use a unified system for grading secondary school qualifications. Generally, the English and Welsh secondary school grading follows in line with the GCSE grades.

=== National Curriculum Assessment ===
In the compulsory state education system up to the age of 14, assessment is usually carried out at periodic intervals against National Curriculum levels. This is especially the case at the end of each Key Stage, at the ages of 7, 11 and 14, where students are statutorily assessed against these levels. The levels are applied to each of the compulsory subjects, and range from Level 1 to Level 8, with an additional band for 'Exceptional Performance'. The Department for Education states that students should be expected to reach a standard level of 67 marks at the end of each Key Stage. These are stated as being Level 2 at age seven, Level 4 at age eleven, and then Level 5 at age twelve, and level 6c level 8a at age fourteen. Children are expected to make two sub levels of progress per year, e.g.: average=4c in year 6, whilst average in year 7=4b, year 8=5c and finally, year 9=5a.

=== General Certificate of Secondary Education (GCSE) ===
GCSEs are commonly studied from the age of 13/14 until the age of 16, and are the second to last portion of mandatory qualifications.

There are two concurrent GCSE grading systems. In England, GCSEs are graded numerically from 1 (lowest) to 9 (highest), with a 4 being considered a passing grade. For the GCSE English Language Spoken Language component students receive either a Pass, Merit, Distinction or Unclassified. In Wales and Northern Ireland, a letter grade scale is used, with grades of A* (highest), A, B, C, D, E, F and G (lowest). In Northern Ireland, a new grade C* was introduced in 2019 to line up with the English grade 5.

In both systems, work below the grade G or 1 standard is denoted as 'Unclassified' (U). For comparison purposes, a grade C is considered equivalent to a 4, and an A is equivalent to a 7, and an 8 is equivalent roughly to an A*.

Here is a comparison of the current and former GCSE grading systems, as well as the old O-Level and CSE grading systems:

Approximate equivalences for GCSE, O-Level and CSE grades
National Cohort	GCSE Grade				O-Level Grade	CSE Grade
%'ile	England from 2017 ^{a}	Northern Ireland from 2019 ^{b}	Wales from 1994; England, NI 1994–2019 ^{c}	1988–1993	1975–1987 ^{d}	1965–1987
5%	9	A*	A*	A	A	1
15%	8	A	A*	A	B	1
15%	8	A	A	B	C	1
25%	7	A	A	B	D	2
40%	6	B	B	C	E	2
55%	5	C*	B	D	E	2
55%	5	C*	C	D	U	3
70%	4	C	C	E	U	4
85%	3	D	D	F	U	5
95%	2	E	E	G	U	U
95%	2	F	F	U	U	U
98%	1	F	F	U	U	U
98%	1	G	G	U	U	U
98%	U	U	U	U	U	U

- Notes:
  - GCSE grades 9 to 4 (A* to C) – Certificate and qualification awarded. At GCSE, considered a 'standard pass', and awards a qualification at Level 2 of the RQF.
  - GCSE grades 3 to 1 (D to G) – Certificate and qualification awarded. At GCSE, awards a qualification at Level 1 of the RQF.
  - U: ungraded/unclassified – no certificate or qualification awarded
  - ^a 9–1 grades phased in by subject between 2017 and 2019 in England
  - ^b New A*–G grades in Northern Ireland from 2019
  - ^c A*–G grades as used in Wales since 1994, and in England and Northern Ireland between 1994 and 2019
  - ^d Before 1975, each exam board had its own grading system (some used letters, others numbers). Grades were only given to schools and not recorded on students' certificates

=== GCE Advanced Level (A-Level) ===
GCE Advanced Levels are post-16 qualifications in the United Kingdom, and are graded on a letter grade scale, from highest to lowest: A*, A, B, C, D, E. As in GCSE, there is an 'Unclassified' (U) grade below the minimum standard required for a grade E. The A* grade was introduced in 2010. Previously an intermediate N (Nearly passed) grade was awarded for papers below grade E by a very small margin (not used since 2008).

Advanced Subsidiary Levels (AS-Levels), considered to be worth 40% of an A-Level (50% of an A-Level before 2017), are graded on a similar scale, but do not have an A* grade.

=== International Foundation Year ===
International Foundation Year (2015+) is graded on a 7-point scale of A, A−, B+, B−, C+, C−, D, F. (F meaning Failed or not acceptable).

2014–2015 grades:

- A – Pass
- B – Pass
- C – Pass
- D – Pass/Failcourse
- F – Fail

== Scotland ==
Scotland's education system uses the following structure:

Some children take National 4 or National 5 in their 4th year/S4 at high school (aged about 15/16). In some schools, if children are in top set in S3 (aged 14/15) they will study the Nat 5 course but they do not take the exams. National 4/5 are thought to be preparation for the Highers & Advanced Highers. If you are taking your national 4 you most likely will take the national 5 exams next year.

=== Standard Grade ===
Standard Grade, Intermediate 1 and Intermediate 2 courses are no longer available in Scottish schools and have been replaced by National 4 and National 5 awards.

=== National qualifications ===
Advanced Highers

- A (around 77–100%)
- B: Above average grade, very good (around 60–77%)
- C: Minimum pass, improvement needed (around 50–60%)
- D: Close fail (between 40% and 49%)
- N/A: Fail/No Pass (0–40%)

Highers

- A: Best possible grade, excellent (around 70–100%)
- B: Above average grade, very good (around 60–70%)
- C: Minimum pass, improvement needed (around 50–60%)
- D: Close fail (between 40% and 49%)
- N/A: Fail/No Pass (0–40%)

National 5

- A: Best possible grade, excellent (around 70–100%)
- B: Above average grade, very good (around 60–70%)
- C: Minimum pass, improvement needed (around 50–60%)
- D: Close fail (between 40% and 49%)
- N/A: Fail/No Pass (0–40%)

National 4

The National 4 award is not graded and is only pass or fail.

Each grade is further sub-divided into 'bands'. The A grade comprises bands 1 and 2, the B grade has bands 3 and 4, and so on. These bands are not shown on certificates issued by the SQA and do not need to be stated on CVs.

The National 4 Grading is equivalent to Standard Grade General, while national 5 Grading is equivalent to Standard Grade Credit. Highers remain at the same level as the previous grading under the same name, and Advanced Highers are equivalent to the old CSYS (Certificate of Sixth Year Studies).

Percentage pass marks for each grade change from year to year depending on performance levels.

=== National courses ===
- A: best possible grade (around 85.5% and above)
- B: above average grade (around 80% to 85)
- C: pass (around 70% and above)
- D: awarded fail (around 50–60%)
- No Award: Less than 50%
