= Eduard Thurneysen =

Swiss clergyman and theologian (1888–1974)

The Reverend Eduard Thurneysen
- Born: 10 July 1888; Walenstadt, Switzerland
- Died: 21 August 1974 (aged 86); Basel, Switzerland
- Spouse: Marguerite Thurneysen-Meyer

Ecclesiastical career
- Religion: Christianity (Reformed)
- Church: Reformed Church of Aargau; Evangelical-Reformed Church of the Canton Basel-Stadt

Academic background
- Education: University of Basel; University of Marburg; University of Zurich
- Influences: Christoph Blumhardt; Bernhard Duhm; Paul Wernle

Academic work
- Discipline: Theology
- Sub-discipline: Practical theology
- School or tradition: Dialectical theology
- Institutions: University of Basel

Eduard Thurneysen (1888–1974) was a Swiss Protestant clergyman and theologian, who was an important representative of dialectical theology.

Born in Walenstadt on 10 July 1888, he studied theology under Bernhard Duhm and Paul Wernle at the University of Basel, and from 1911 served as an assistant secretary of the Christliche Verein Junger Menschen (YMCA) in Zürich. From 1913 to 1920 he was a pastor in Leutwil, during which time, he came in close contact with Karl Barth, then a minister in nearby Safenwil.

In 1920 he took charge of the parish in St. Gallen-Bruggen, then from 1927 to 1959 was a pastor at the Basel Minster. From 1930 he taught classes in theology at the University of Basel, becoming an associate professor of practical theology in 1941. In 1960–1963 he gave guest lectures in Hamburg, Wuppertal, and Berlin.

From 1923 to 1933 he was editor of the journal Zwischen den Zeiten, and from 1933 with Karl Barth, was editor of the publication Theologische Existenz heute.

Thurneysen died on 21 August 1974 in Basel.

== Selected works ==
- Dostojewski, 1921 – On Fyodor Dostoyevsky.
- Komm Schöpfer Geist! : Predigten (with Karl Barth, 2nd edition, 1924); translated into English as Come, Holy Spirit; Sermons (1933).
- Christ und welt : fragen und antworten, 1950 – Christ and the world. questions and answers.
- Die Lehre von der Seelsorge, 1946; translated into English as A Theology of Pastoral Care (1962).
- Die Bergpredigt, 1963; translated into English as The Sermon on the Mount (1964).
- Ein Briefwechsel aus der Frühzeit der dialektischen Theologie (with Karl Barth, 1966) – Correspondence from the early days of dialectical theology.
- Psychoanalyse und dialektische Theologie : zum Freud-Verständnis (with Karl Barth, Paul Ricœur) – Psychoanalysis and dialectical theology; understanding Freudianism.
