= Christoph Blumhardt =

German Lutheran theologian (1842–1919)

- Blumhardt, c. 1917
- Born: Christoph Friedrich Blumhardt; 1 June 1842; Möttlingen
- Died: 2 August 1919 (aged 77); Jebenhausen, Germany
- Occupations: Christian minister; theologian; politician
- Political party: Social Democratic Party of Germany
- Spouse: Emilie Bräuninger (m. 1870)
- Parents: Johann Blumhardt (father); Doris Köllner (mother)

Ecclesiastical career
- Religion: Christian (Lutheran)

Scholarly background
- Education: University of Tübingen

Scholarly work
- Discipline: Theology
- School or tradition: Christian socialism
- Influenced: Karl Barth; Hermann Kutter; Leonhard Ragaz; Eduard Thurneysen

Christoph Friedrich Blumhardt (1842–1919) was a German Lutheran theologian and one of the founders of Christian socialism in Germany and Switzerland. He was a well-known preacher. In 1899 he announced his support for socialism and joined the Social Democratic Party of Germany; for this, he lost his position as minister. The next year, he was elected to the state parliament of Württemberg.

As the First World War broke out, he declared his belief in a coming Kingdom of God, declaring "we live in the time before a massive change in the world. This darkness will be vanquished through the Lord Jesus Christ." He was a significant influence on the theologians Karl Barth, Hermann Kutter, and Leonhard Ragaz, who were also Christian socialists.

The son of Johann Christoph Blumhardt, Christoph Blumhardt was born at Möttlingen on 1 June 1842, at the very time his father was becoming involved in the struggle with Gottliebin's demons. As his father had done before him, he took university training pointing toward a Reformed pastorate. However, he became disillusioned with the church and theology and so decided simply to return home to Bad Boll and act as a helper there. Upon his father's death, then, he took over as housefather and continued the work until his own death in 1919.

In time, the younger Blumhardt became quite renowned as a mass evangelist and faith healer. But after a very successful "crusade" in Berlin in 1888, he drastically cut back both activities, saying,

I do not want to suggest that it is of little importance for God to heal the sick; actually, it now is happening more and more often—although very much in quiet. However, things should not be promoted as though God’s kingdom consists in the healing of sick people. To be cleansed is more important than to be healed. It is more important to have a heart for God’s cause, not to be chained to the world but be able to move for the kingdom of God.

Blumhardt's interest gradually took what could be called "a turn to the world", namely, a focus upon the great socioeconomic issues of the day. Under the impetus of this concern Blumhardt chose, in a public and conspicuous way, to cast his lot with democratic socialism, the much-maligned workers' movement that then was fighting tooth and nail for the right of the working class. Although it brought upon his head the wrath of both the civil and ecclesiastical establishments, he addressed protest rallies, ran for office on the party slate, and was elected to a six-year term in the Württemberg legislature. He was asked to resign his ministerial status in the church. Blumhardt began as a very active and energetic legislator, but as time passed he greatly curtailed this activity and bluntly declined to stand for a second term of office. Clearly, the pattern was of a piece with his earlier retreat from mass evangelism and faith healing.

Blumhardt's disillusionment with democratic socialism – i.e., with the party politics, not with the movement's purposes and ideals – and the even greater disillusionment which came toward the close of his life with the dark years of the First World War. These brought him to a final position expressed in the dialectical motto: Wait and Hasten. Staunchly anti-war, his understanding was that the call of the Christian is still for him to give himself completely to the cause of the kingdom. To do everything in his power to help the world toward that goal. Yet, at the same time, a Christian must remain calm and patient, unperturbed even if his efforts show no signs of success, willing to wait for the Lord to bring the kingdom at his own pace and in his own way. And, according to Blumhardt, far from being inactivity, this sort of waiting is itself a very strong and creative action in the very hastening of the kingdom. Blumhardt suffered a stroke in 1917 and died a peaceful death on 2 August 1919 in Jebenhausen.
