= Opposition to the War of 1812 in the United States =

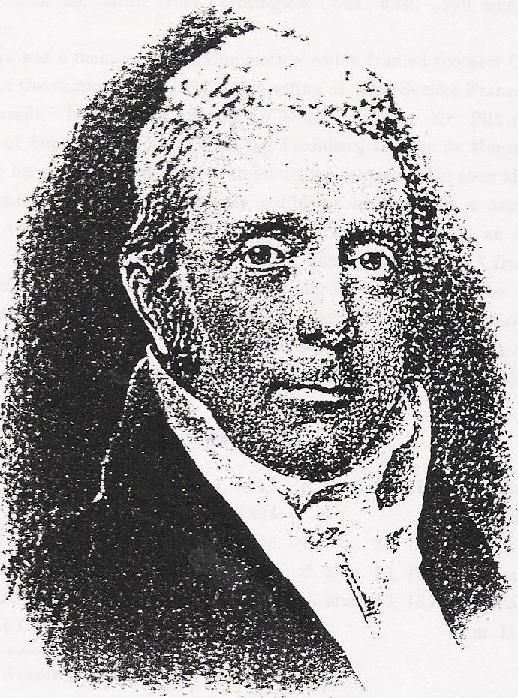
An engraving of Timothy Pitkin, the leader of the Federalist Party during the War of 1812.

Opposition to the War of 1812 was widespread in the United States, especially in New England. Many New Englanders opposed the conflict on political, economic, and religious grounds. When the Embargo Act of 1807 failed to remedy the situation with the United Kingdom, with Britain refusing to rescind the Orders in Council (1807) and the French continuing their decrees, certain Democratic-Republicans known as war hawks felt compelled to persuade the United States government to declare war on the British. A number of contemporaries called it, "The second war for independence." Henry Clay and John Calhoun pushed a declaration of war through Congress, stressing the need to uphold American honor and independence. Speaking of the impact of the depressed cotton trade upon his fellow Southerners, Calhoun told Congress that:

They see, in the low price of their produce, the hand of foreign injustice; they know well without the market to the continent, the deep and steady current of supply will glut that of Great Britain; they are not prepared for the colonial state to which again that Power [Great Britain] is endeavoring to reduce us. The manly spirit of that section of our country will not submit to be regulated by any foreign Power.

Vehement protests against "Mr. Madison's War" erupted in those parts of the country where the opposition party, the Federalists, held sway, especially in Connecticut and Massachusetts. The governors of these two states, along with Rhode Island, refused to place their state militias under federal control for duty outside the territory of their respective states. In the ensuing 1812 and 1813 United States House of Representatives elections, some members of Congress who voted for the war paid the price. Eight sitting New England congressmen were rejected by the voters, and several others saw the writing on the wall and declined to seek re-election. There was a complete turnover of the New Hampshire delegation.

== Federalist Party ==
Federalists were opposed to war with the United Kingdom before 1812, which can be seen in their opposition to the Embargo of 1807. While many Democratic-Republicans thought of the war as a "test of the Republic", Federalists denounced calls for war, with John Randolph of Roanoke advising James Madison to abandon the thought of war, as it would threaten United States commerce. Randolph was one of the most prominent congressmen who opposed a war with Britain, perceiving calls for such a conflict as "foolhardy and driven by land hunger rather than violations of American rights." In Congress, he gave a speech in which Randolph argued "We have heard but one word, like the whip-poor-will, but one eternal monotonous tone—Canada! Canada! Canada!" When the US declared war on Britain in 1812, he responded by stating in Congress "Gentlemen, you have made war. You have finished the ruin of our country. And before you conquer Canada your idol (Napoleon) will cease to distract the world and the Capitol will be a ruin." Randolph's words would prove prophetic, as British forces burned the Capitol in 1814.

All members of Congress that voted for declaring war on Britain in 1812 were Republicans, while twenty-two opposed declaring war, along with forty Federalists. Following Madison's declaration of war, the Federalist minority in the House of Representatives released "An Address...to their constituents on the war with Great Britain", which identified the Federalists as the party of peace, rebuffing many of the points Madison made in his declaration of war. As the war continued, New England Federalists maintained their opposition. However, much of the financing and a substantial portion of the army and navy came from the region. In the number of recruits furnished the regular army, only New York supplied more. Elbridge Gerry, the Vice President, and William Eustis, the secretary of war, hailed from Massachusetts. A distinguished U.S. general, Henry Dearborn, came from New Hampshire, and talented naval officers such as Isaac Hull, Charles Morris, and Oliver Perry were New Englanders. Just as importantly, New England sent more officially sanctioned privateers to sea than other states in the war.

Opposition extended beyond financial obstruction and manifested in military noncooperation as well. Some state leaders insisted that militia forces were strictly for local defense and not to be deployed outside state borders. This state-centered interpretation of military authority led to direct conflict with federal war efforts. A prime example occurred in November 1813, when Vermont Federalist Governor Martin Chittenden ordered a brigade of Vermont militia stationed in Plattsburgh, New York, to return home. He argued that Vermont’s troops were being misused for national defense rather than the protection of their own state—a stance grounded in the belief that the President did not have the authority to deploy state militias beyond state borders. Though some officers refused to obey Chittenden’s orders, the incident underscored the extent to which New England Federalists were willing to resist federal authority.

While the British blockade intensified around the southern coast in 1812–1813, New England ports remained open, allowing trade to continue. This economic advantage enabled New England to increase its manufacturing output, supplying goods to other regions cut off from British imports. However, New England’s Federalist-controlled banks largely refused to lend financial support to the war. By 1814, the federal government had borrowed over $40 million, yet less than $3 million came from New England, despite it being one of the wealthiest regions in the country.

Throughout the war, Federalists in Congress stifled bills that levied more funding for the war, and in September 1814, when Madison issued a conscription bill to increase the number of men within the professional army, Federalists publicly opposed the bill and likened it to Napoleon's levée-en-masse, once again associating Republicans with the French emperor. The Federalists had no control of national policy, however. As the war dragged on, they grew increasingly frustrated. Eventually, some in New England began to advocate constitutional changes that would increase their diminished influence at the national level. The Hartford Convention, with 26 delegates from Massachusetts, Connecticut, Rhode Island, and dissident counties in Vermont and New Hampshire, was held in December 1814 to consider remedies. It was called to discuss proposed constitutional amendments. Many Federalists within Massachusetts believed that the Hartford Convention was the only way to save the Union from Republicans, and from civil war. Its final report called for several Constitutional amendments. However, when convention representatives arrived in Washington to advocate their changes, they were greeted with news of a peace treaty with the United Kingdom, the Treaty of Ghent, which essentially restored the pre-war status quo. This undercut their position, leaving them with little support. They returned home, and the decline of the Federalist Party continued.

== Popular opposition ==
At the outbreak of war, there was widespread resistance by many Americans, with many militias refusing to go to war, and bankers even refusing to back a Federal currency and relieve the government of its debt. A Massachusetts paper, the Salem Gazette, reprinted Madison's Federalist No. 46, in which Madison made the argument for defending states' rights against a national government, in response to the national government trying to press the state militia into national service.

While a sense of patriotism offered support for the war, outside Federalist strongholds, as the war dragged on and the U.S. suffered frequent reversals on land, opposition to the war extended beyond Federalist leaders. As a result, the pool of army volunteers dried up. For example, after the British captured Fort Niagara, General George McClure tried to call up the local militia to drive them back but found that most would not respond, tired of repeated drafts and his earlier failures. Even those who did appear, McClure wrote, were more interested "in taking care of their families and property by carrying them into the interior, than helping us to fight." There were many examples of other militias refusing to enter Canada, and either disobeying or simply refusing orders to move into Canadian territory.

Political opinions even interfered with communication between officers at the beginning of the war. This was shown in national recruitment efforts as well: while Congress authorized the War Department to recruit 50,000 one-year volunteers, only 10,000 could be found, and the Army never reached half of its authorized strength. A national conscription plan was proposed in Congress, but defeated with the aid of Daniel Webster, though several states passed conscription policies. Even Kentucky, the home state of the best-known war hawk Henry Clay, was the source of only 400 recruits in 1812. It was not until the war was concluded that its retrospective popularity shot up again.

== Backlash ==
Many members of the Democratic-Republican Party viewed opposition as treasonous or near-treasonous once the war was declared. The Washington National Intelligencer wrote that, "WAR IS DECLARED, and every patriot heart must unite in its support... or die without due cause." The Augusta Chronicle wrote that "he who is not for us is against us."

This sentiment was especially strong in Baltimore, at the time a boomtown with a large population of recent French, Irish, and German immigrants who were eager to prove their patriotism. In early 1812, several riots took place, centering on the anti-war Federalist newspaper the Federal Republican. Its offices were destroyed by a mob. Local and city officials, all war hawks, expressed disapproval of the violence but did little to stop it. When the editors of Federal Republican tried to return, they were removed from protective custody in jail by a mob, on the night of July 27, and tortured; one Revolutionary War veteran, James Lingan, died of his injuries. Opponents of the war then largely ceased to openly express their opposition in Baltimore. However, Federalists did take advantage of the incident to publicize Lingan's funeral in stories that were widely printed about around the country.

The Baltimore riots were the height of violent backlash during the war, whose popularity dropped through 1813 and 1814. However, after the war, when the Hartford Convention's proceedings became public just after a peace treaty was signed with Britain, there was a longer-term backlash against the Federalist Party, which became associated with secession and treason. The party never regained national predominance, fielding its last presidential candidate in 1816 and fading away entirely by the end of the 1820s.

== Legacy ==
The War of 1812 was the first war declared by the United States, and some historians see it as the first to develop widespread antiwar sentiment. (However, there was also anti-war sentiment during the Quasi-War and the First Barbary War.) There is little direct continuity between the opponents of the War of 1812 and later antiwar movements, as the Federalist party's objections weren't based on pacifism, and as this same "antiwar" party effectually disappeared soon after peace was concluded. The end of the war also influenced the growing unpopularity of the Federalist party, as the Hartford Convention was quickly condemned by Republicans, especially in light of the American victory at New Orleans.

However, the war did result in the formation of the New York Peace Society in 1815 in an effort to prevent similar future wars. The New York Peace Society was the first peace organization in the United States, lasting in various incarnations until 1940. A number of other peace societies soon formed, including eventually the American Peace Society, a national organization that exists to the present day. The American Peace Society was formed in 1828 by the merger of the Massachusetts Peace Society and similar societies in New York, Maine, and New Hampshire.

The War of 1812 is less well known than 20th-century U.S. wars, but no other war had the degree of opposition by elected officials. Nevertheless, historian Donald R. Hickey has argued that "The War of 1812 was America's most unpopular war. It generated more intense opposition than any other war in the nation's history, including the war in Vietnam."

== See also ==
- Opposition to the War of 1812 in Britain
- Pacifism in the United States

== Bibliography ==
- Banner, James M. Jr. (1969). To the Hartford Convention: The Federalists and the Origins of Party Politics in Massachusetts, 1789–1815. Alfred A. Knopf. ISBN 978-0-394-44911-1. OL 5216728M.
- Benn, Carl (2002). The War of 1812. Essential Histories. Osprey Publishing. ISBN 978-1-84176-466-5.
- Bickham, Troy (2012). The Weight of Vengeance: The United States, the British Empire, and the War of 1812. Oxford University Press. ISBN 978-0-19-539178-7.
- Brown, Roger H. (1971) [first published in 1964]. The Republic in Peril: 1812. W. W. Norton & Company. ISBN 978-0-393-00578-3.
- Brynn, Edward (Winter 1972). "Patterns of Dissent: Vermont's Opposition to the War of 1812" (PDF). Vermont History. 40 (1): 10–27. ISSN 0042-4161. OCLC 841489757. Archived (PDF) from the original on September 19, 2023.
- Buel, Richard Jr. (2006). America on the Brink: How the Political Struggle Over the War of 1812 Almost Destroyed the Young Republic. St. Martin's Griffin. ISBN 978-1-4039-7393-1.
- Degree, Kenneth A. (Summer–Fall 2010). "Impasse! Vermont's 1813 Legislative Session" (PDF). Vermont History. 78 (2): 151–180. ISSN 0042-4161. OCLC 720382103. Archived (PDF) from the original on April 9, 2025.
- Ellis, James H. (2009). A Ruinous and Unhappy War: New England and the War of 1812. Algora Publishing. ISBN 978-0-87586-690-1.
- Foner, Eric (2008). Give Me Liberty!: An American History. Vol. 1: To 1877 (2nd Seagull ed.). W. W. Norton & Company. ISBN 978-0-393-93257-7. OCLC 186363411.
- Hickey, Donald R. (1989). The War of 1812: A Forgotten Conflict. University of Illinois Press. ISBN 978-0-252-06059-5. OL 2059634M.
- Horsman, Reginald (1969). The War of 1812. Alfred A. Knopf. OCLC 1344. OL 5615653M.
- Meigs, William M. (1917). The Life of John Caldwell Calhoun. Vol. I. Neale Publishing Company. OCLC 2381165. OL 7059180M.
- Stoltz, Joseph F. III (2017). A Bloodless Victory: The Battle of New Orleans in History and Memory. Johns Hopkins Books on the War of 1812. Johns Hopkins University Press. doi:10.1353/book.57227. ISBN 978-1-4214-2302-9.
- Strum, Harvey (Winter 1980). "New York Federalists and Opposition to the War of 1812". World Affairs. 142 (3): 169–187. ISSN 0043-8200. JSTOR 20671825. OCLC 9990572232.
- Tryon, James L. (March 1911). "The Rise of the Peace Movement". The Yale Law Journal. 20 (5): 358–371. hdl:20.500.13051/10918. ISSN 0044-0094. JSTOR 784019.
