= List of American flag officers killed during the War of 1812 =

Over the course of the War of 1812, several high ranking American officers were killed. Note that until 1857, Captain was the highest rank in the United States Navy.

== List ==
Rank	Name	Command	Date of Death	Place of Death	Cause of Death	Ref.
Brigadier General	James Lingan	Maryland State Militia	28 July 1812	Baltimore, Maryland	Killed during the 1812 Baltimore riots.	
Brigadier General	Zebulon Pike	Landing force of the Army of the North	27 April 1813	York, Upper Canada	Killed by debris from firearm magazine explosion during the Battle of York.	
Captain	James Lawrence	USS Chesapeake	4 June 1813	USS Chesapeake	Died of wounds received during the Battle of Boston Harbor	
Brigadier General	Leonard Covington	Third Brigade	14 November 1813	French Mills, New York	Died of wounds received during the Battle of Crysler's Farm.	
Brigadier General	John Swift		14 July 1814	Queenston, Upper Canada	Died of wounds received during the failed invasion of Fort George.	
Brigadier General	Benjamin Howard	Eighth Military Department	18 September 1814	St. Louis, Missouri	Died of an illness after an expedition against Native American villages around Lake Pimiteoui.	

== See also ==
- List of British flag officers killed during the War of 1812
