= Peace Society =

Peace society refers to several different organizations:

- American Peace Society
- Arkansas Peace Society
- German Peace Society
- International Peace Society
- Massachusetts Peace Society
- Movement of Society for Peace
- New York Peace Society
- Peace History Society
- The World Peace Prayer Society
- Women's Peace Society
