= Blue River Friends Hicksite Meeting House and Cemetery =

Historic site in Washington County, Indiana

- U.S. National Register of Historic Places
- Location within Indiana
- Location: 1232 North Quaker Road, Washington Township, Washington County, Indiana
- Coordinates: 38°37′11″N 86°4′16″W
- Built: 1815
- Website: www.blueriverfriends.org
- NRHP reference No.: 100005866
- Added to NRHP: August 29, 2019

Blue River Friends Hicksite Meeting House and Cemetery were established in a Quaker settlement northeast of Salem in Washington County, Indiana. The meeting house was built in 1815. They were added to the National Register of Historic Places on August 29, 2019.

The meeting house is now called the Old Blue River Friends Church. Not to be confused with the Little Blue River Friends Church in Morristown, Indiana.

== Settlement ==
Quakers began to settle in Washington County in 1808 from Virginia and North Carolina, both of which were slave states. At least 784 families fled North Carolina after the state that passed a law that made it legal to re-enslave people immediately after their emancipation. Matthew Coffin was among the earliest pioneers, arriving in 1809, after a seven-week long journey from North Carolina. More families continued to arrive, with another group of Quakers arriving in 1812, who built a simple log cabin for religious services. The Blue River Friends Settlement continued to grow after General William Henry Harrison had driven hostile Native Americans from the area in late 1813.

The Quakers came from North Carolina and to a lesser extent from Rhode Island and Pennsylvania. Their houses were built near the Coffin and Samuel Lindley homesteads. In 1815, Quakers at Blue River established a monthly meeting at the Hicksite Friends Meeting House, located just east of Salem. Coffin donated two acres for the building and a cemetery. While the church was being built, its members planned to build a school and created a committee of 24 people to look after and promote the civilization of Native Americans.

Some Quaker families brought their black servants with them. William Lindley sponsored John Williams, who established a 160-acre homestead. A single man, he operated a farm and a cattle and hog ranch, which made him wealthy for the time. This made some people jealous and anxious to hurt him. He was killed in the middle of the night in December 1864, and he left an estate of $5,500 (equivalent to $113,218 in 2025). After the estate was settled in 1870, the money was donated to the Indianapolis Asylum for Colored Orphan Children (also called the Indianapolis Asylum for Friendless Colored Children), which was established that year.

Benjamin Franklin Trueblood was a minister of the church beginning in 1869 and was later a college professor and president from 1871 to 1890. He served the American Peace Society until 1915.

== Hicksites and orthodox Quakers ==
Elias Hicks was a liberal Quaker preacher and an abolitionist who opposed Evangelicalism, which stressed established beliefs. His followers were known as the liberal branch of the Society of Friends, or Hicksites. In 1817, he was called a heretic for his opposition to adopting a set creed at the yearly Quaker meeting. Ten years later, he was held responsible for a schism between the liberal and orthodox factions of the faith. Due to the division, church membership declined over time and in the 1870s the church was reduced to half its original size. The liberal and orthodox factions remained isolated from one another until the 20th century.

The meeting house is now called the Old Blue River Friends Church. A historic marker is located near the church.
