= James Tryon =

James Tryon may refer to:

- James Libby Tryon (1864–1958), peace advocate and the director of admissions at the Massachusetts Institute of Technology
- James R. Tryon (1837–1912), Surgeon General of the United States Navy
