= List of British flag officers killed during the War of 1812 =

Over the course of the War of 1812, several high ranking British officers were killed.

== List ==
Name	Rank	Command	Date	Notes
Sir Isaac Brock	Major General	Militia forces of Upper Canada	13 October 1812	Killed during the Battle of Queenston Heights
Robert Ross	Major General	British forces on the East Coast	12 September 1814	Killed during the Battle of North Point
Sir Edward Pakenham	Major General	Commander of British forces at New Orleans	8 January 1815	Killed during the Battle of New Orleans
Sir Samuel Gibbs	Major General	Second-in-command of British forces at New Orleans	9 January 1815	Died of wounds received during the Battle of New Orleans

== See also ==
- List of American flag officers killed during the War of 1812
