= Benjamin Franklin Trueblood =

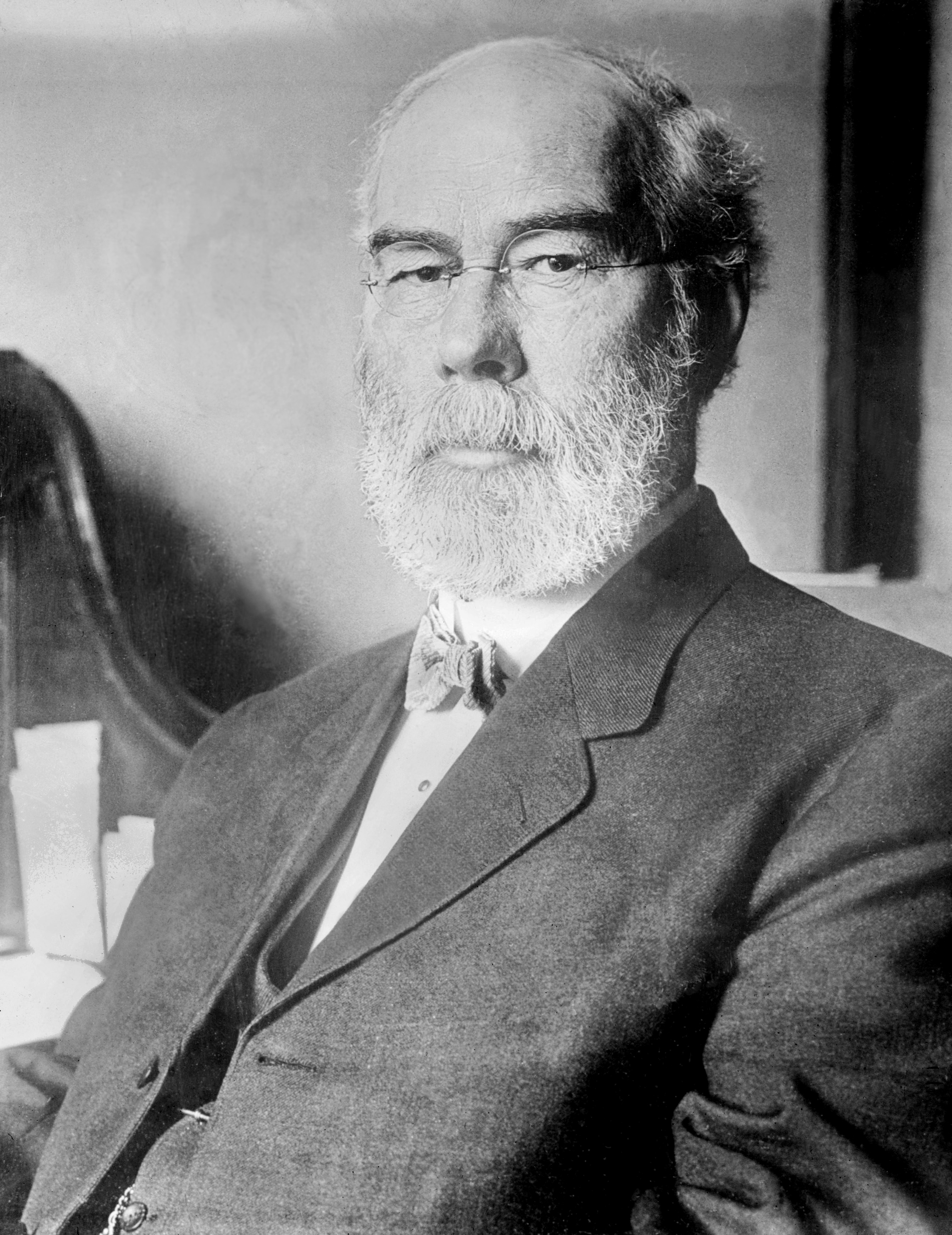
- Trueblood in 1913
- Born: November 25, 1847; Salem, Indiana, United States
- Died: October 26, 1916 (aged 68); Newton Highlands, Massachusetts
- Occupations: College professor and president, peace activist
- Known for: General Secretary of the American Peace Society (1892–1915) and executive council of the American Society of International Law
- Spouse: Sarah Terrell
- Relatives: Mary Esther Trueblood (niece)
- Awards: Nobel Peace Prize nomination in 1913

Academic background
- Education: Earlham College (B.A., M.A.) and two L.L.D degrees

Benjamin Franklin Trueblood (1847–1916) was an American pacifist who served the American Peace Society for 23 years. In this role, he functioned as the official public spokesperson and representative of the Society. He served as editor of the Society's journal, The Advocate of Peace which contained numerous articles by Trueblood. He was elected to the executive council of American Society of International Law in 1905.

Trueblood was a professor at three colleges and president of Wilmington and Penn Colleges. He translated Immanuel Kant's Perpetual Peace: A Philosophical Sketch and authored numerous pamphlets and books, including Federation of the World. He was nominated by Klas Pontus Arnoldson for the Nobel Peace Prize in 1913.

== Personal life and education ==
Benjamin Franklin Trueblood was born in Salem, Indiana on November 25, 1847, to Esther Parker and Joshua A. Trueblood. His parents were Quakers, and he belonged to the Society of Friends throughout his life. His brother was Rev. Alpheus Trueblood, a Quaker minister. Trueblood attended Earlham College, earning his B.A. degree in 1869. He received an M.A. at Earlham in 1875 and received two L.L.D. degrees, one of which was an honorary Doctor of Law degree from the University of Iowa.

Trueblood married Sarah Terrell of New Vienna, Ohio in 1872. They had three children. Irvin Cyler died in infancy. His other two children were Lyra Dale and Florence Esther. Trueblood died at his home in Newton Highlands, Massachusetts on October 26, 1916. (Note: The Richmond Item stated that he died in Boston, Massachusetts on October 27, 1916.) He was buried at the Sugar Grove Cemetery in Wilmington, Ohio.

== Minister and educator ==
Trueblood was a principal at the Raisin Valley Seminary in Michigan in 1869 and within the same year he became the minister of the Blue River Friends Meeting House. In 1871, he was a professor at Earlham College, where he taught English literature. In 1873, Trueblood was next at Penn College in Iowa, where he taught Latin and Greek. He was the president of Wilmington College in Ohio from 1874 to 1879, after which he was the president of Penn College through 1890.

== American Peace Society ==
After spending 1890 and 1891 in Europe as the foreign secretary of the Christian Arbitration and Peace Society, he joined the American Peace Society as its general secretary in 1892. From 1892 to 1913, he was the editor of the Advocate of Peace. Trueblood was present at the 1899 Hague Peace Conference, and arrived there on May 21, 1899 – three days after its opening, according to the memoirs of Bertha von Suttner. He was one of the earliest members of the American Society of International Law, being elected to the executive council of ASIL in 1905.

He spoke at the Universal Peace Congress in 1905 in Lucerne, Switzerland, during which he eulogized President Theodore Roosevelt and reported on the progress of the peace movement in the United States. He translated Immanuel Kant's Perpetual Peace: A Philosophical Sketch and authored numerous books and pamphlets. Trueblood's book Federation of the World contains his two Adin Ballou lectures. He was nominated by Klas Pontus Arnoldson for the Nobel Peace Prize in 1913. He served the American Peace Society until 1915, during which he increased its membership from 400 to nearly 8,000.

== See also ==
- List of peace activists
