= Robert Paine (sculptor) =

American sculptor

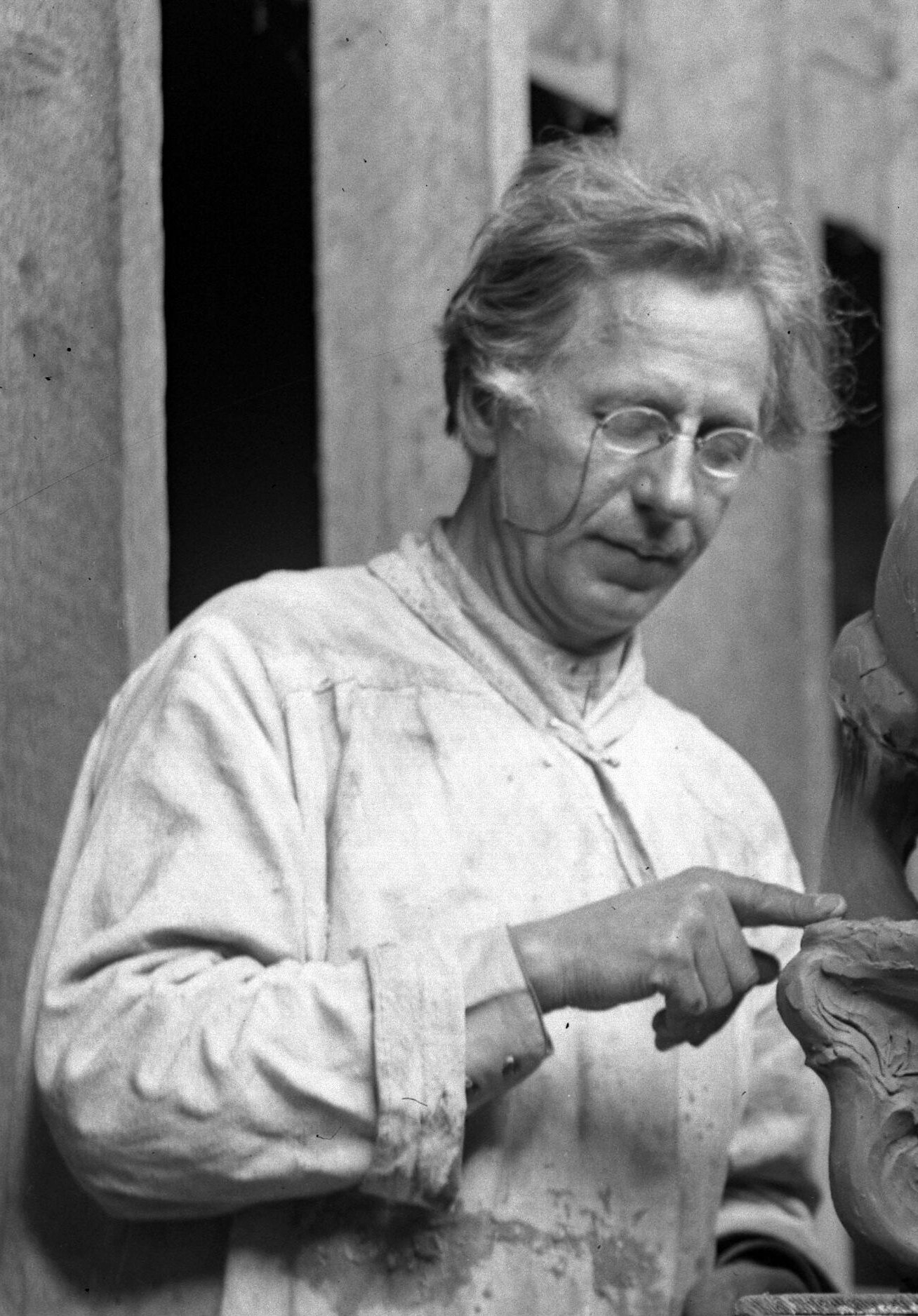
Paine, c. 1935

Robert Treat Paine (1870–1946) was an American sculptor.

== Early life ==
Paine was born in Valparaiso, Indiana, on February 11, 1870, a descendant of the Robert Treat Paine who was one of the signers of the Declaration of Independence. He was a student at the Art Students League, where he studied with Augustus Saint Gaudens.

== Pointing machine and the Pan American Exposition ==
He spent time at the Cornish (New Hampshire) Art Colony, becoming an assistant to Saint Gaudens. While there he perfected the pointing machine used by Gaudens, called a "cubical pantograph," that increased the "accuracy and speed" of the previous machines, allowing for up to 400 points a day. The machine, while relatively new, was used to increase to monumental proportions the 500 clay models accepted in 1900 by Karl Bitter, director of sculpture, for the 1901 Pan-American Exposition in Buffalo, New York. Thirty-five sculptors, including Saint Gaudens, and 50–75 assistants worked for 5 months tirelessly in Weehawken, New Jersey, to produce the 500 plaster-and-fiber statues to be displayed in the temporary Rainbow City of Light, celebrating the genius of man at the dawn of the 20th century.

Paine's marvelous invention was also used on Sherman's horse on the Sherman Monument in New York (1903).

== Panama-Pacific International Exposition ==
In 1914 Paine went to San Francisco with fellow sculptor Beniamino Bufano to create a sculpture ensemble designed by Paul Manship for the Panama–Pacific International Exposition. He settled in Berkeley for a time.

== Los Gatos cats ==
In 1922, he stayed at the estate of Charles Erskine Scott Wood and Sara Bard Field in Los Gatos and created a pair of large statues of wild cats that are still local landmarks. An image of his pair of sculptures is included in the town seal and is used on other signage.

== Federal Art Project ==
In 1924 he moved to Los Angeles, where he assisted Alexander Phimister Proctor on sculpture projects and was active on the Federal Art Project.

== Personal life ==
Paine married mathematician Mary Esther Trueblood in 1910; after they moved to Berkeley, she became an instructor in the extension program of the University of California, Berkeley.

== See also ==
Oral history of his daughter Evelyn and her husband, Berkeley architect Robert Ratcliff
