= Opposition to the War of 1812 in Britain =

The War of 1812 was unpopular in Britain even before war was declared. The British public was not in favour of the war due to economic and moral reasons, but the government continued the war as part of their war against Napoleon. As the economy continued to suffer, the opposition continued to grow, and as Britain's war with the French continued, many in Britain began to disdain the idea of opening another front. The burning of the White House also caused backlash to the war.

== Opposition before the war ==
=== Economic opposition ===
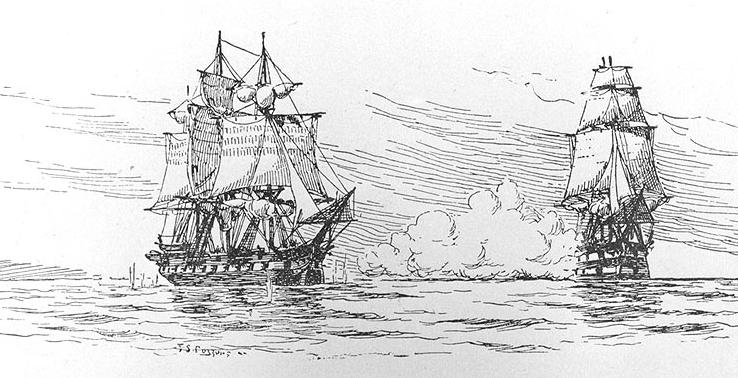
The incident between HMS Leopard and USS Chesapeake that sparked the Chesapeake-Leopard Affair. Drawn by Fred S. Cozzens and published in 1897.

The first public opposition to the War of 1812 came in 1807, when the Royal Navy engaged the USS Chesapeake, which many thought would lead to war. The loudest opposition came from The Morning Chronicle, a popular newspaper of the time. The paper published anonymous letters, signed A.B., warning war with America would forcibly set the young nation on the path to becoming self-reliant for its manufacturing, thus harming British manufacturers. Most of the opposition to the war was based on economic grounds. America was not only a major consumer of British manufacturing, but it was also a major supplier of raw materials, such as wood and cotton. For example, the U.S. alone made up more than half the cotton imports to Britain in the years leading up to the War of 1812.

==== Orders in Council ====
British opposition coalesced around the Orders in Council. Part of the larger maritime war with France, the Orders were intended to cut off French trade with the rest of world. The policy affected American traders, who claimed they should be able to trade with both nations, since they belonged to a neutral country in the struggle against Napoleon. While many in Britain saw the American anger at impressment as nothing more than whining, more sectors sympathised with American concerns due to the Orders in Council. Almost every British industry was affected by the policy, as America was a large supplier and consumer for the British economy. Sectors like textiles and manufacturing continued to suffer, while industries like finance were also dealt a serious blow. Cities like Liverpool, which heavily relied upon American shipping, felt the loss of the trading partner in their economies. Some publications, such as the Glasgow Journal, accused Parliament of keeping the orders in place so that they could make money from selling exemptions to the rule. By the spring of 1812, Parliament had seen the toll the orders took on the economy and decided to suspend them.

=== Opposition to war in America and France ===
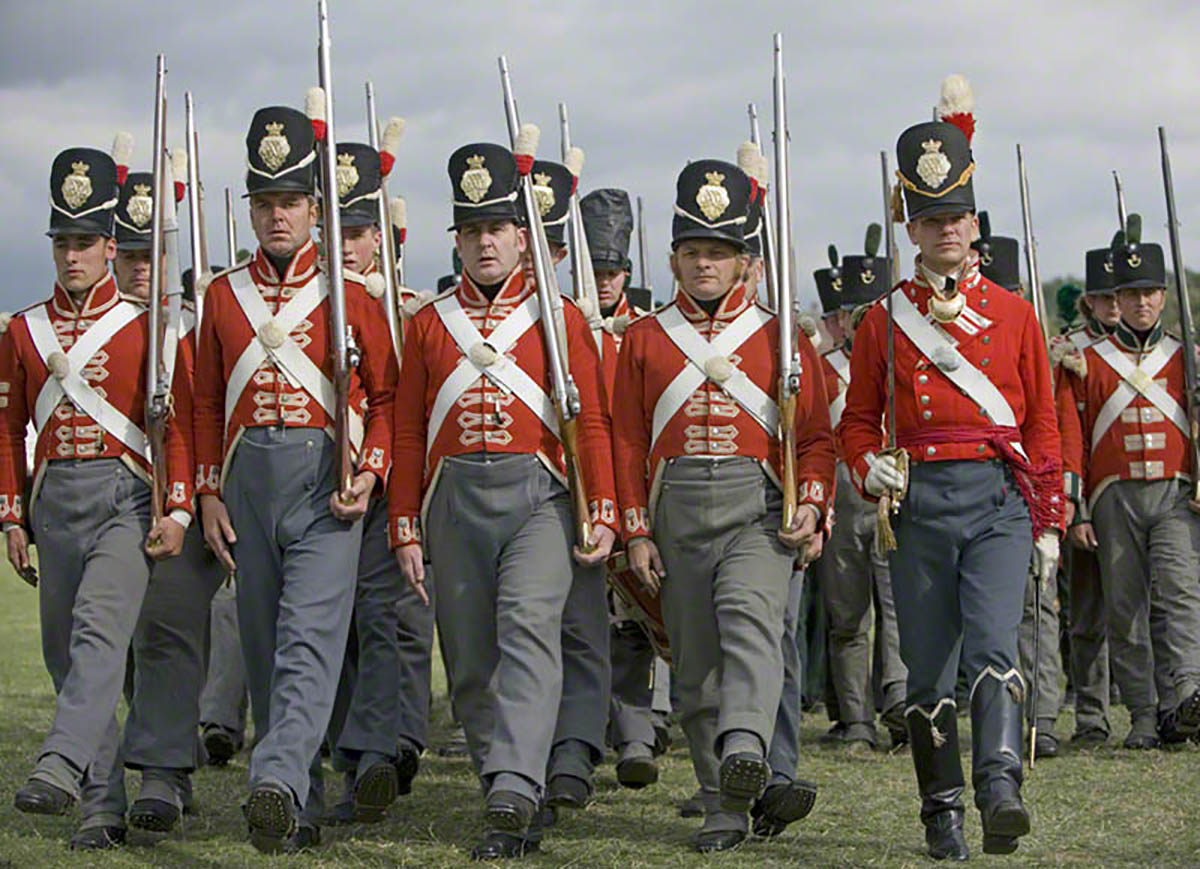
Re-enactors in the uniform of the 33rd Regiment of Foot (Wellington's Redcoats), who fought in the Napoleonic Wars between 1812 and 1816, here showing the standard line 8th Company.

Much of the opposition to the War of 1812 came from general opposition to war in Britain during the time. Britain had been at war with France since 1793, with only a brief peace in 1802, and the Napoleonic Wars seemed to have no end. By 1812, defence spending, as a percentage of GDP, was almost 25%. The effects of war hit the British public as well. The nation had become the most militarised in the world, with 20% of all males ending up in the military, leading Britain to have a substantially higher rate of mobilisation than even its rival, France. The death rate among those in the military also rose dramatically, further angering the British public.

For those not in the military, the war affected the pocketbook. By 1812, almost 35% of income went to taxes, a rate much higher than the tax rates in previous wars. Given all of this, many in Britain were angered about the start of another war, which some, like William Cobbett of the Weekly Register, argued was just another method of profit for corporations. Movements, such as the Friends of Peace, sprung up to advocate for peace with France and America.

== Opposition during the war ==
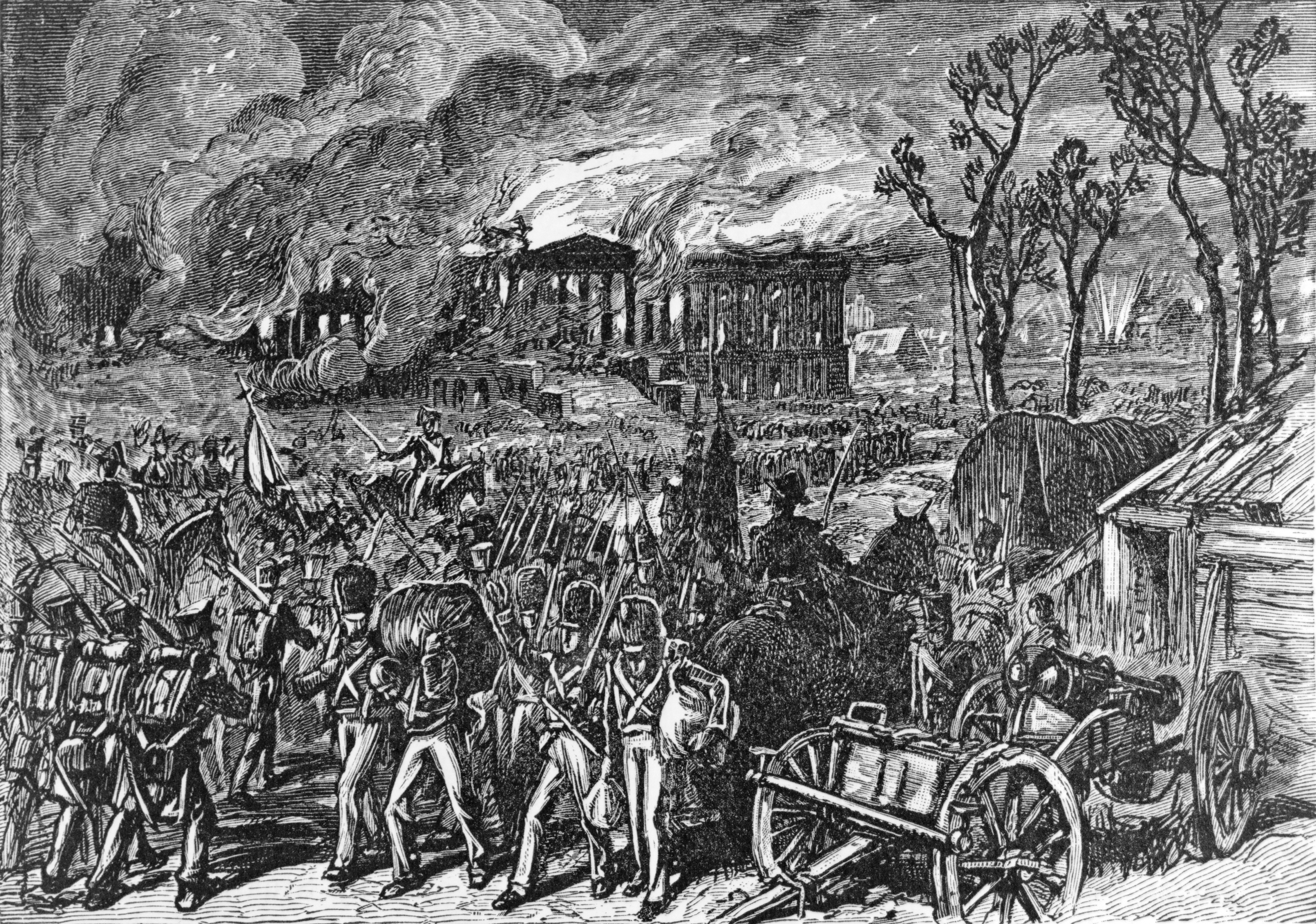
Capture and Burning of Washington, in 1814, wood engraving, 1876.

=== Opposition to the burning of the White House ===
The last major point of opposition against the War of 1812 came when the British burned the White House, along with other public buildings in Washington, D.C, in August 1814, in retaliation for the American destruction of Port Dover. Many argued that America deserved to be treated with the same wartime respect that the European powers received, as burning down a capital of foreign city was not done in Europe. Other feared it might weaken Britain's position at the Congress of Vienna. For Britain, many viewed the burning as a moral wrong, since the White House was not a fort or a battle encampment. The continued upset at the decision contributed to Parliament's decision to expedite peace negotiations, which resulted in the Treaty of Ghent in December 1814.
