= Prospect House (Washington, D.C.) =

Historic house in Washington, D.C., United States

- U.S. National Register of Historic Places
- U.S. National Historic Landmark District – Contributing property
- D.C. Inventory of Historic Sites
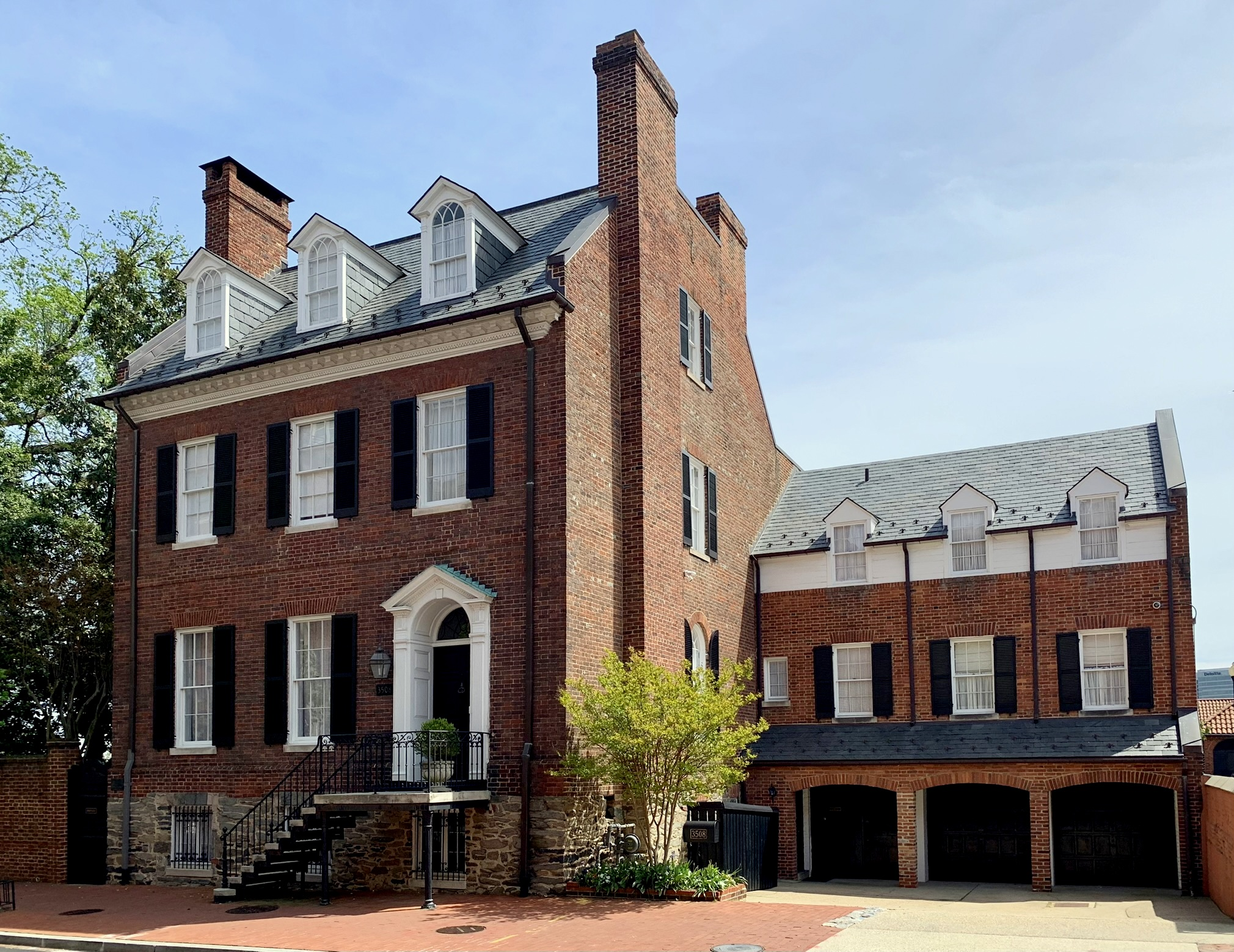
- Prospect House in 2022

- Location within Washington, D.C.
- Location: 3508 Prospect Street, N.W. Washington, D.C.
- Coordinates: 38°54′21.09″N 77°4′10.58″W
- Built: 1788
- Architectural style: Georgian
- Part of: Georgetown Historic District (ID67000025)
- NRHP reference No.: 72001430

Significant dates
- Added to NRHP: March 16, 1972
- Designated DCIHS: November 8, 1964

Prospect House (also known as the Lingan-Templeman House) is a historic building, located at 3508 Prospect Street, Northwest, Washington, D.C., in the Georgetown neighborhood.

== History ==
It was built in 1788, by James Lingan, designed by William Thornton, architect of the United States Capitol. President John Adams visited the residence and Gilbert du Motier, marquis de Lafayette was a house guest. It was a guest house, while Blair House was under renovation. Notable previous owners include Secretary of Defense James Forrestal. In 1951, Congressman Richard Thurmond Chatham and his wife Patricia Firestone Coyner purchased and remodeled Prospect House. In June 1977, the property was purchased by David and Carol Ann Shapiro.

Prospect House is listed on the National Register of Historic Places, and is a contributing property to the Georgetown Historic District. Its 2024 property value is $14,660,100. The house is directly adjacent to the Georgetown Car Barn.

Prospect House was sold by Kim Gibson with Washington Fine Properties in October 2025 for $9.8 million.
