= William Ladd =

American anti-war activist

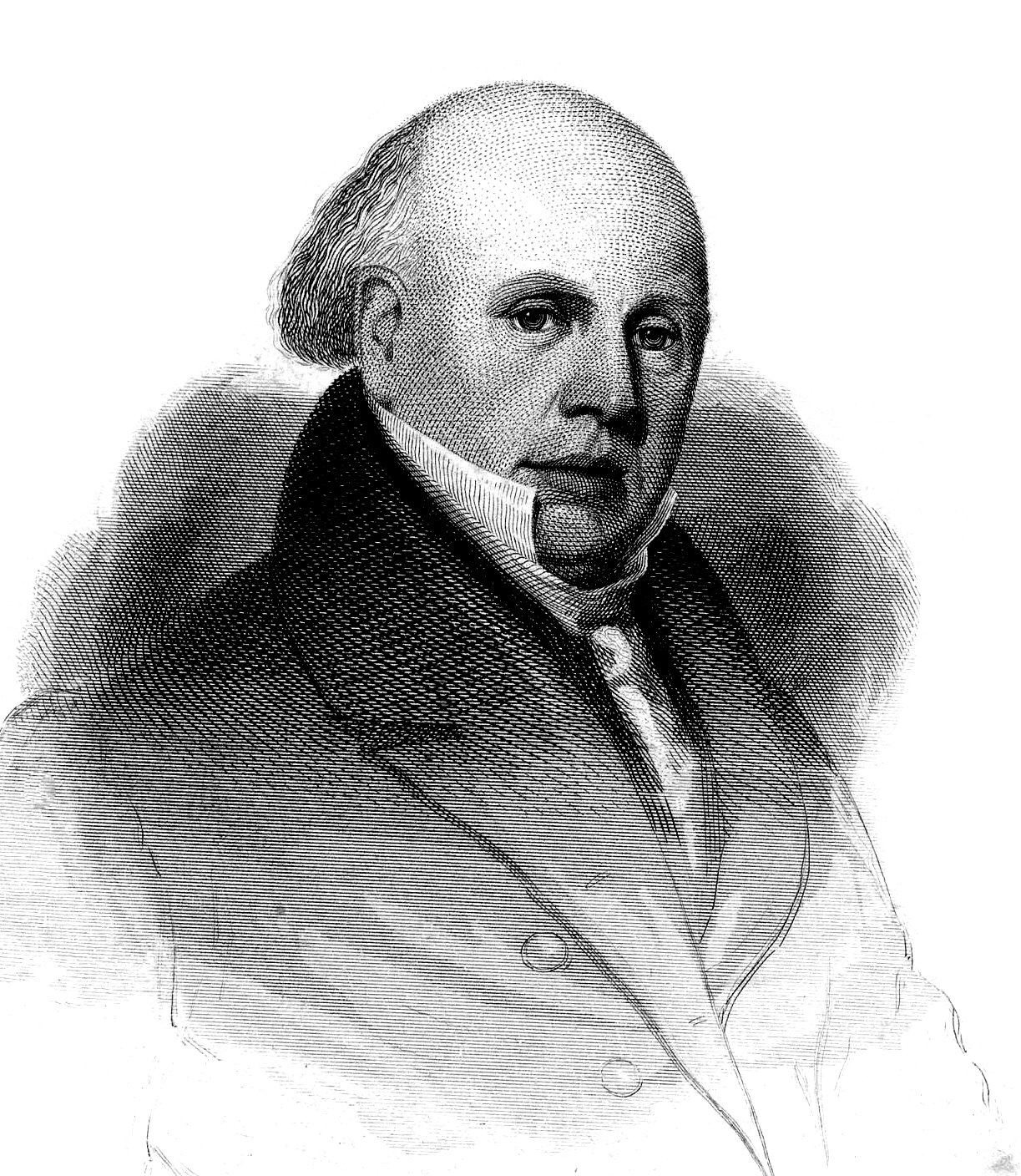
- Born: William C Ladd; May 10, 1778; Exeter, New Hampshire
- Died: April 9, 1841 (aged 62)
- Occupation: Ship captain
- Known for: Founder and first President of the American Peace Society

William Ladd (May 10, 1778 – April 9, 1841) was one of the earliest American anti-war activists, and the first president of the American Peace Society.

== Biography ==
William Ladd was born on 10th May 1778 in Exeter, New Hampshire. He was the eldest son of Eliphalet Ladd and Abigail Hill. He graduated in 1793 from Harvard with a B.A. degree, after which he shipped as a seaman from Portsmouth, New Hampshire in a vessel owned by his father, a local merchant. At 20 years old he was a capable New England captain and had seen much of the world. He briefly had a plantation in Florida which ultimately failed as he refused to use slave labor.

A disbeliever in war for any purpose, he turned landsman at the outbreak of the War of 1812, when the British blockade temporarily stopped commerce. He moved to Minot, Maine, became a prosperous farmer, and devoted both his tongue and his pen to preaching non-resistance. In 1823 he wrote the first of 32 Essays on Peace and War, published in the Christian Mirror of Portland, Maine, which laid out a Christian case for pacifism. These essays were published pseudonymously as a book in 1825 (Portland, ME: Shirley & Edwards) under the title The Essays of Philanthropos on Peace and War; a second revised and corrected edition was published in 1827 (Exeter, NH: J. T. Burnham in behalf of the Exeter and other peace societies). Subsequent essays would criticize the slave trade and the raising of the Bunker Hill Monument in Charlestown, Massachusetts as a memorial to war.

State and local "peace societies" already existed in the 1820s, but in 1828 the American Peace Society was formed with Ladd as its first president. The first meeting was held in New York City. Ladd wrote and published the society's newspaper, The Harbinger of Peace (later The Calumet) from his house in Minot, Maine. In 1837, due to Ladd's influence and against the arguments of other members, including the president of Bowdoin College, the constitution of the American Peace Society was amended to declare that all war was contrary to the Christian Gospel.

In 1840 Ladd proposed a plan for a World Congress and Court of Nations, somewhat similar to the later League of Nations or United Nations. He published An Essay on a Congress of Nations (1840). He was partly influenced by the military build-up the year before in his home state of Maine because of a border dispute with Britain, the so-called Aroostook War.

Ladd is buried in Portsmouth, New Hampshire

== See also ==
- List of peace activists
