= James Libby Tryon =

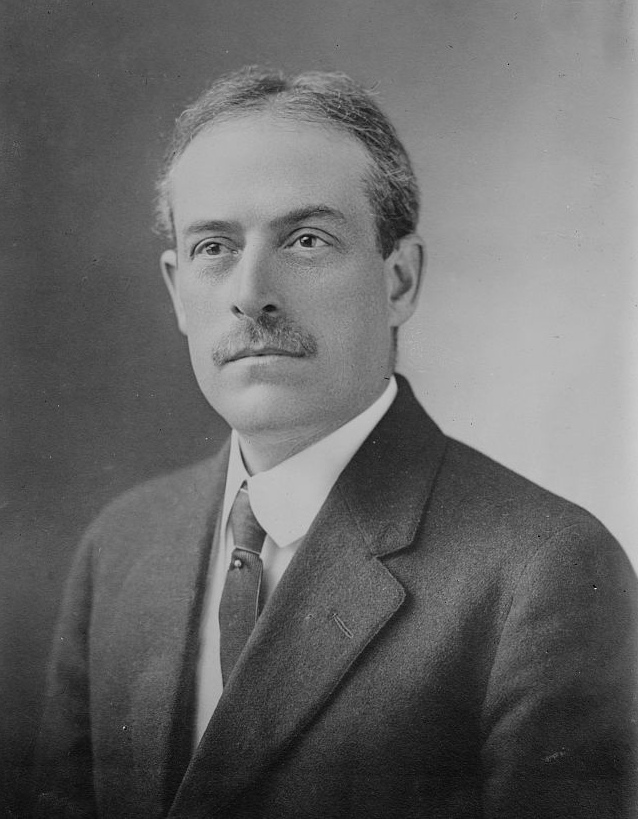
James Libby Tryon in 1916

James Libby Tryon (November 21, 1864 – December 21, 1958) was a peace advocate and the director of admissions at the Massachusetts Institute of Technology. He was a member of the Massachusetts Peace Society that merged with other local chapters to become the American Peace Society in 1928.

== Biography ==
James Libby Tryon was born on November 21, 1864, in Boston, Massachusetts, to Joseph A. Tryon and Ellen Bigelow Cummings. He attended Harvard University and graduated with degrees in law and divinity: A.B., Harvard, 1894; B.D., Episcopal Theological School, Massachusetts, 1897; L.L.B., Boston University, 1909, Ph.D., 1910. He was a reporter for the Portland Press, 1884; its city editor, 1885, city editor of the Bangor Commercial, 1886; night editor of the Portland Argus, 1887–8. He was appointed deacon, 1896; priest, 1897, rector of All Saints' Church, Attleboro, Mass., 1897–1907; assistant secretary of the American Peace Society, 1907–11; secretary of the Massachusetts Peace Society, and was appointed director of the New England department of the American Peace Society, June, 1911. He served as a member of the International Peace Congress held in Munich in 1907, in London, 1908, in Geneva, 1912, in The Hague, 1913. He lectured on international arbitration at the Episcopal Theological School in Cambridge, Massachusetts from 1908 to 1911. He undertook a lecture tour of Canadian clubs, universities and churches to promote the peace centennial during the spring of 1911. He also served as a member of the Massachusetts Prison Association, the American Society of International Law, the American Society for the Judicial Settlement of International Disputes, the American Political Science Association and the American Academy of Political and Social Science.

He was the Director of Admissions at the Massachusetts Institute of Technology from 1930 to 1936.

Tryon died on December 21, 1958, in Medford, Massachusetts, at Lawrence Memorial Hospital of Medford.

== Publications ==
- The Inter-parliamentary Union and its work (1911)
- A World Treaty of Arbitration (1911)
- A permanent court of international justice; a suggestion for the programme committee of the third Hague conference (1913)
- The century of the Anglo-American peace (1914)
