= 1812 Baltimore riots =

Violent riots in the summer of 1812 in Baltimore, Maryland, US

- Part of Opposition to the War of 1812
- Date: 22 June 1812 – 28 July 1812
- Location: Baltimore, Maryland, United States
- Caused by: Anti-war articles written in a Federalist newspaper
- Result: Riots suppressed: Office of the Federal Republican newspaper destroyed

Parties
Rioters	Federalists; Pro-British Americans

Lead figures
George Woolslager	James Lingan †; Henry Lee III (WIA); Alexander C. Hanson (WIA)

Casualties and losses
At least 2 killed Several injured	At least 1 killed Several injured 11 severely injured (Note: On 28 July only)

The Baltimore riots of 1812 were a series of violent riots that occurred in the months of June and July 1812 in Baltimore, Maryland. The riots were in response to a series of anti-war articles written in a Federalist newspaper by federalist statesman Alexander Contee Hanson after the United States had declared war on United Kingdom of Great Britain and Ireland during the War of 1812.

== Origins ==
At the 1808 United States presidential election the Democratic-Republican candidate James Madison won his first term as the President of the United States. Madison won the vast majority of his vote outside of the Federalist stronghold of New England. In Maryland, the vote was split with nine votes for Madison and two votes for the Federalist candidate Charles Cotesworth Pinckney.

On 18 June 1812, Madison signed off a declaration of war upon the United Kingdom, thus starting the War of 1812. Every Federalist member of congress voted against declaring war.

A Federalist statesman in the Maryland House of Delegates named Alexander Contee Hanson launched the Federal Republican & Commercial Gazette newspaper in 1808. It became known as one of the nation's most extreme federalist newspapers.

== Riots ==
=== 22 June ===
On the night of 22 June 1812, just four days after war had been declared, an angry mob gathered outside the office of the Federal Republican newspaper. Angered by the paper's criticism of the Republican administration, the entire office was leveled to its foundations and printing apparatus' were destroyed by the mob. One of the editors narrowly escaped with his life. One of the attackers was killed as he attempted to knock out a window on the upper floor and fell with it on to the street below. The paper's editor, Alexander Contee Hanson, vowed to recommence the paper to assert his rights and resist oppression. The mobs continued for several more weeks, and anyone with Federalist or Pro-British views was attacked.

=== 27 July ===
By 27 July, Alexander Hanson had re-established the Federal Republican in the house of one of its proprietors, Mr. Wagner, and occupied it with around fifteen to twenty other men including James Lingan and Henry Lee III. Fearing that another mob may form, the men were prepared to defend the house and armed themselves with muskets, pistols, and swords. Shortly after eight o' clock in the evening, a mob formed outside and threw stones at the house which broke the windows and burst open the shutters. Henry Lee fired warning shots over the heads of the mob to try and frighten them away but to no avail. The mob broke open the lower door and were fired upon, hitting and killing a man named Dr. Gale, forcing him to be dragged off by the mob. The violence continued throughout the night in which resulted in several men being wounded.

=== 28 July ===
Around sunrise the next day, the mob brought an artillery field piece and placed it in front of the house, but they were prevented from firing it by the arrival of mayor Edward Johnson and other officials. The men were eventually persuaded to vacate the house and taken to the Baltimore Prison under armed guard. The men were marched through the streets on the one-mile journey, protected by two lines of around fifty infantry and twenty Dragoons. Some of the men were injured as protesters who lined the streets threw stones.

The men were placed in the prison without armed guard, despite the mayor promising one and stating that he would lose his own life before the men should be hurt. In the company of the mayor were three men, two named Mumma and Maxwell, one of which had a key in his hand. The men said they were acquaintances of the jailer, but the men suspected that they had bad intentions, having been seen as part of the mob before. A mob said to number around 300 soon gathered outside the prison by nightfall and managed to break in to the prison almost instantly without exertion, making the men believe that it was opened by someone with a key, possibly Mumma or Maxwell. The men attempted to rush the mob to escape, but to no avail, and nine of them were beaten for a number of hours whilst others were not recognized by the mob and managed to escape unhurt. The men had penknives stuck in-to their faces and hands and had hot candle grease poured into their eyes. James Lingan was killed, and an attempt was made to cut off the nose of Henry Lee. Robert Thompson was tarred and feathered and paraded around town on the back of a cart. The men were eventually saved by a Dr. Hall, who encouraged the mob to retire until morning. Hall and four other doctors tended to the men's wounds and commandeered Carriages for the men to make their escape.

== Aftermath ==
Alexander Hanson later moved to Georgetown where he continued to publish his newspaper unmolested. He also continued his political career, elected as a Federalist to the Thirteenth and Fourteenth Congresses until his resignation in 1816. He was then elected to the United States senate in 1816 until his death on his estate in Elkridge, Maryland. He had never fully recovered from his injuries.

Henry Lee suffered severe internal injuries during the violence and was in constant physical pain. He sought relief in the warmer climate of the West Indies but when his condition did not improve, he attempted to return home but died on the way on Cumberland Island in Georgia.

James Lingan was buried in Georgetown in a funeral procession that was headed by George Washington Parke Custis and attended by some of the men who survived the mob. Lingan's remains were moved many years after his death to Arlington National Cemetery.
