= World Affairs =

American quarterly journal on international relations

- Discipline: International relations
- Language: English

Publication details
- History: 1837 to present
- Publisher: SAGE Publications for the Policy Studies Organization (United States)
- Frequency: Quarterly

Standard abbreviations
- ISO 4: World Aff.

Indexing
- ISSN: 0043-8200 (print); 1940-1582 (web)
- JSTOR: worldaffairs
- OCLC no.: 60652588

Links
- Journal homepage; Journal at SAGE Journals

World Affairs is an American quarterly journal covering international relations. At one time, it was an official publication of the American Peace Society. The magazine has been published since 1837 and was re-launched in January 2008 as a new publication. It was published by the World Affairs Institute from 2010 to 2016, when it was sold to the Policy Studies Organization. Each issue contains articles offering diverse perspectives on global issues and United States foreign policy. World Affairs is headquartered in Washington, D.C. Prior to 1932, the magazine was published monthly and under a variety of names, including The Advocate of Peace. Those articles have since been digitized by JSTOR and are freely viewable up to 1923.

== Notable contributors ==
- Elliott Abrams
- Fouad Ajami
- Ayaan Hirsi Ali
- Andrew Bacevich
- Ian Bremmer
- Helene Cooper
- Jackson Diehl
- Eric Edelman
- Tom Gjelten
- Ethan Gutmann
- Roya Hakakian
- Michael V. Hayden
- Christopher Hitchens
- Robert Kagan
- Mary Kissel
- Charles Lane
- Lewis Libby
- H.R. McMaster
- P. J. O’Rourke
- George Packer
- Richard Perle
- David Rieff
- Marc Thiessen
- Michael J. Totten
- James Traub
- Michael Zantovsky

== History of name changes ==
The journal has undergone a series of name changes since initially published in 1837:

- 1837–1845: The Advocate of Peace
- 1847–1884: Advocate of Peace
- 1889–1892: The American Advocate of Peace and Arbitration
- 1892–1893: American Advocate of Peace
- 1894–1920: The Advocate of Peace
- 1920–1932: Advocate of Peace through Justice
- 1932–present: World Affairs

== See also ==
- Benjamin Franklin Trueblood
