= Glasgow Journal =

- Publisher: Andrew Stalker
- Editor: Andrew Stalker
- Founded: 20 July 1741
- Headquarters: Glasgow, Scotland

The 'Glasgow Journal' was a newspaper printed in Glasgow from 1741.

== History ==
=== Founding ===
The newspaper was first printed on 20 July 1741. It was edited by Andrew Stalker, and was printed by Robert Urie and Co. for the editor and Alexander Carlisle, who were booksellers.

== See also ==
- List of newspapers in Scotland
