= James Lingan =

American Revolutionary War officer (1751–1812)

James McCubbin Lingan
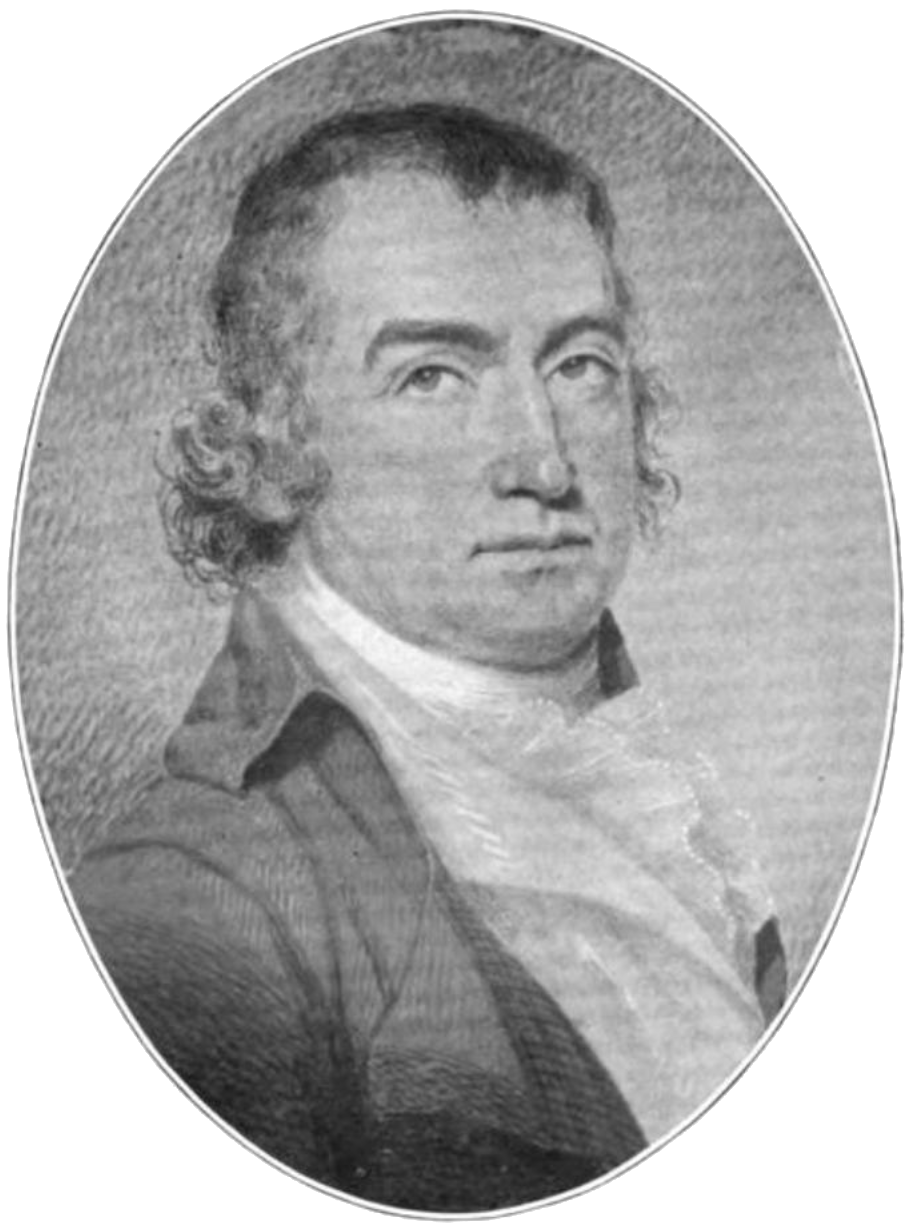
- Portrait of Lingan
- Born: May 15, 1751; Maryland, U.S.
- Died: July 28, 1812 (aged 61); Baltimore, Maryland, U.S.
- Burial place: Arlington National Cemetery, Arlington Virginia
- Spouse: Janet Henderson (m. 1791)
- Military career
- Allegiance: United States of America
- Branch: Continental Army; Maryland State Militia
- Service years: 1776–1812
- Rank: Brigadier General
- Conflicts: American Revolutionary War: Battle of Fort Washington (POW); War of 1812: 1812 Baltimore riots †

James McCubbin Lingan (May 15, 1751 – July 28, 1812) was an officer of the Continental Army during the American Revolutionary War and subsequently a senior officer in the Maryland State Militia. He was taken prisoner at Fort Washington early in the war and spent several years aboard a prison hulk. After independence, Lingan served as a government official in Georgetown. At the outbreak of the War of 1812, Lingan was an outspoken advocate of freedom of the press and was murdered by a mob while defending the offices of an anti-war newspaper in Baltimore.

== Military service ==
Lingan enlisted in the Continental Army on July 13, 1776, only nine days after the signing of the Declaration of Independence. He became a lieutenant in the Rawlings Additional Regiment, but was captured at Fort Washington on November 16, 1776. Imprisoned in the hulk HMS Jersey, Lingan was initially kept in a cell in which he could neither lie down nor stand up. Approached by distant cousin Samuel Hood and offered £10,000 and a commission in the British Army if he agreed to switch sides in the conflict, Lingan was reported to have replied "I'll rot first". Later in his captivity, Lingan gained the reputation as a defender of prisoners' rights. On one occasion, Lingan defended the body of a recently deceased prisoner from guards who wanted to behead the corpse to make it fit into a small coffin.

== Government service ==
Following his release at the end of the war, Lingan was made Collector of the Port of Georgetown by George Washington personally and became a Brigadier-General in the Maryland State Militia. He was also admitted as an original member of the Society of the Cincinnati of Maryland.

== Personal life and death ==
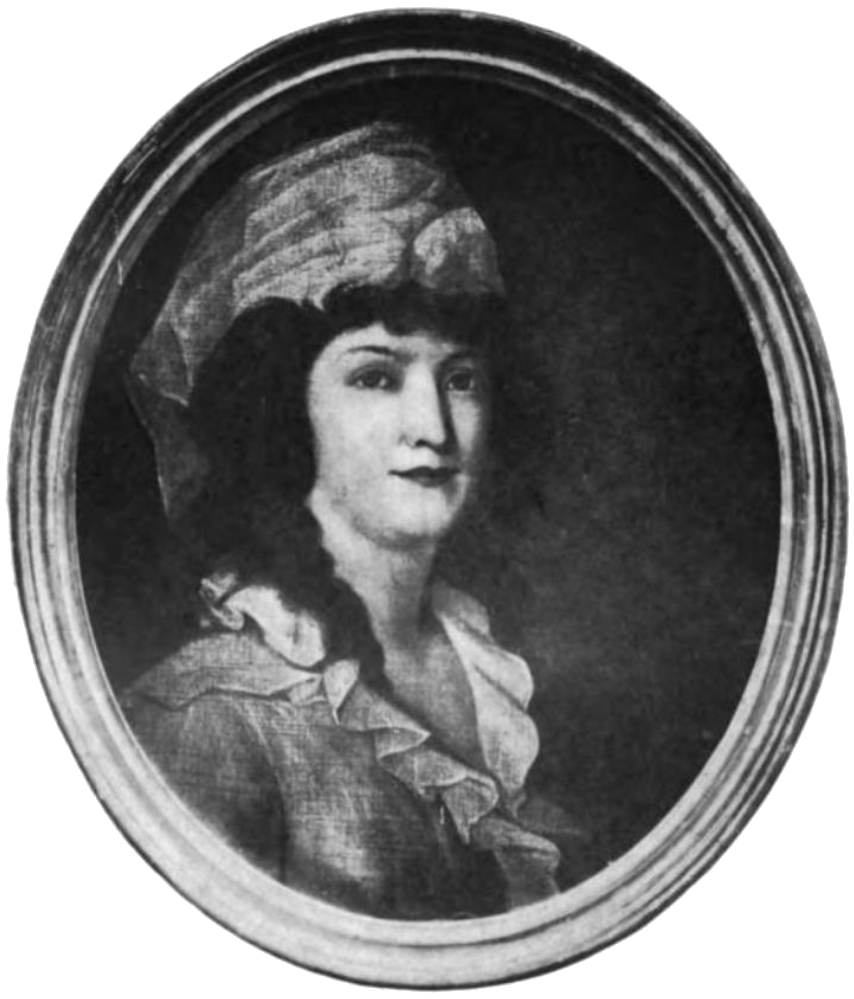
Janet Henderson, wife of Lingan

Lingan married Janet Henderson (1765–1832) on March 4, 1791. Lingan built Prospect House, in Georgetown.

Throughout his life, Lingan was a strong advocate of the freedom of the press and, at the outbreak of the War of 1812, spoke out in opposition to those who favoured censorship. When the offices of the Baltimore Federal Republican were besieged and burnt by a mob angry at anti-war editorials run by the newspaper, Lingan protested at the act and sheltered the newspaper editor, Alexander Contee Hanson, in Georgetown. On July 17, 1812, Hanson resumed printing the newspaper at new offices in Baltimore and another mob formed within hours, again storming the building and destroying the presses. Hanson, with Lingan, Henry Lee III and others who had hastened from Washington to try to calm the crowd, were arrested by local militia and taken to Baltimore City Jail in an attempt to calm the situation.

The crowd, led by an athletic butcher named John Mumma, followed them to the prison and stormed the building. Lingan attempted to stop the mob by displaying a bayonet wound he had received in the Revolutionary War, but that only inflamed the crowd, and Hanson, Lingan and Lee were severely beaten and left for dead. Hanson and Lee survived although the latter was left partially blinded after hot wax was poured into his eyes. Lingan, however, died from his serious injuries.

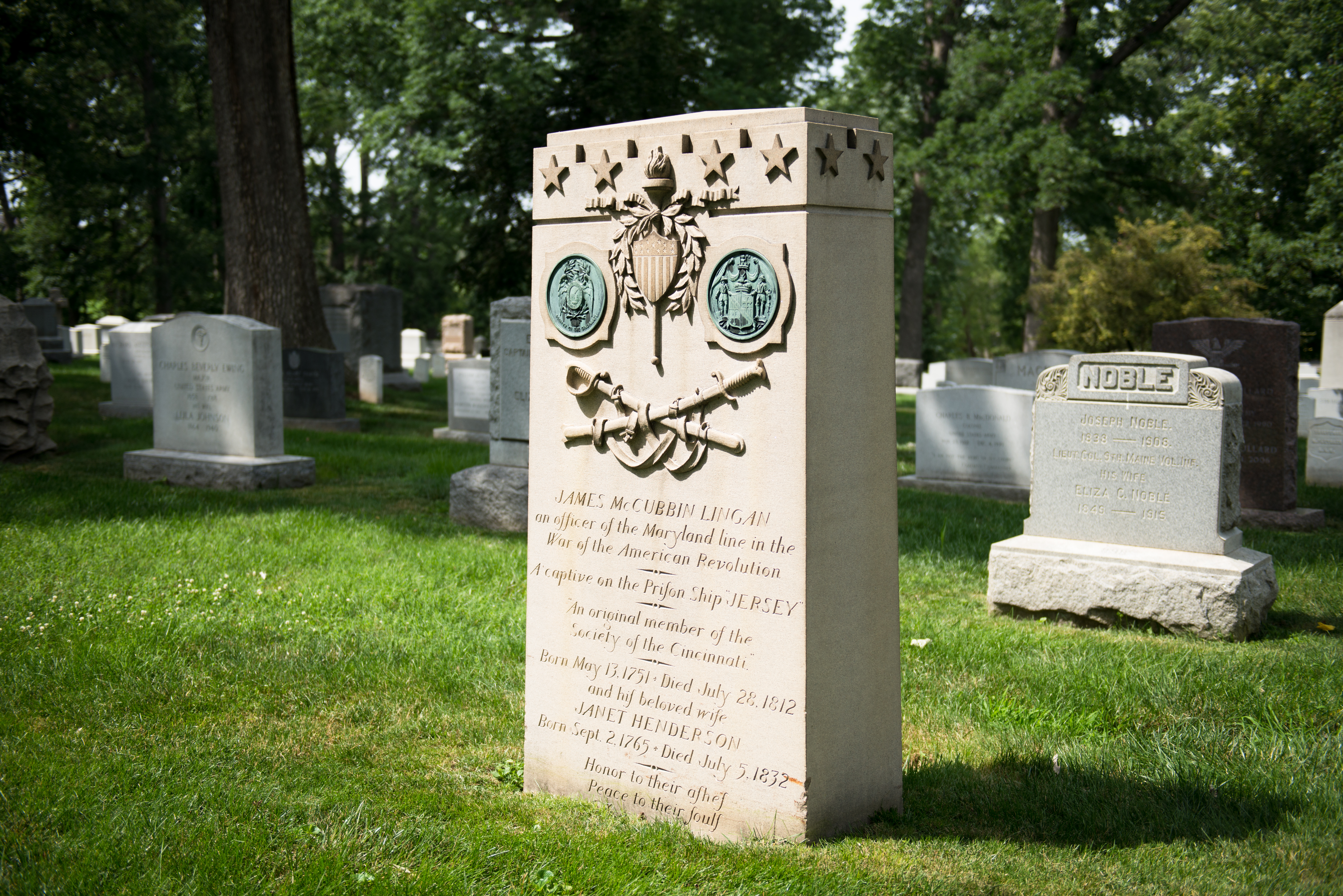
Gravesite of Lingan at Arlington National Cemetery

Lingan was buried at St. John's Church in Georgetown, at a funeral attended by thousands of mourners. George Washington Custis read the eulogy, praising Lingan's defence of free press and crying, "Oh Maryland! Would that the waters of the Chesapeake could wash this foul stain from thy character!" Lingan's remains were removed from the burial ground 96 years later in Georgetown and transferred to Arlington National Cemetery. In an odd bit of irony, Arlington Cemetery had been established in 1864 on the grounds of the Arlington Plantation, the home of George Washington Parke Custis.
