= Massachusetts Peace Society =

Historical US anti-war organization

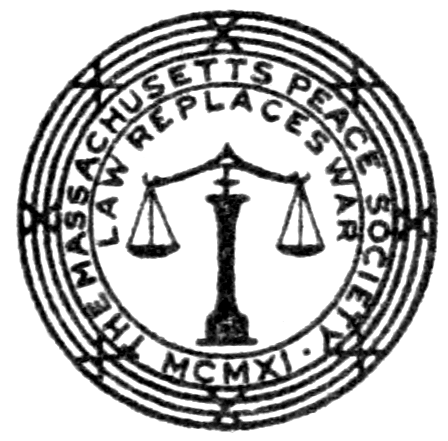

The Massachusetts Peace Society (1815–1828) was an anti-war organization in Boston, Massachusetts, established to "diffuse light on the subject of war, and to cultivate the principles and spirit of peace." Founding officers included Thomas Dawes, William Phillips, Elisha Ticknor, Thomas Wallcut and Noah Worcester. In 1828 the society "merged into the newly formed American Peace Society."

== See also ==
- Pacifism in the United States
