= American Peace Society =

Pacificist group based in New York City

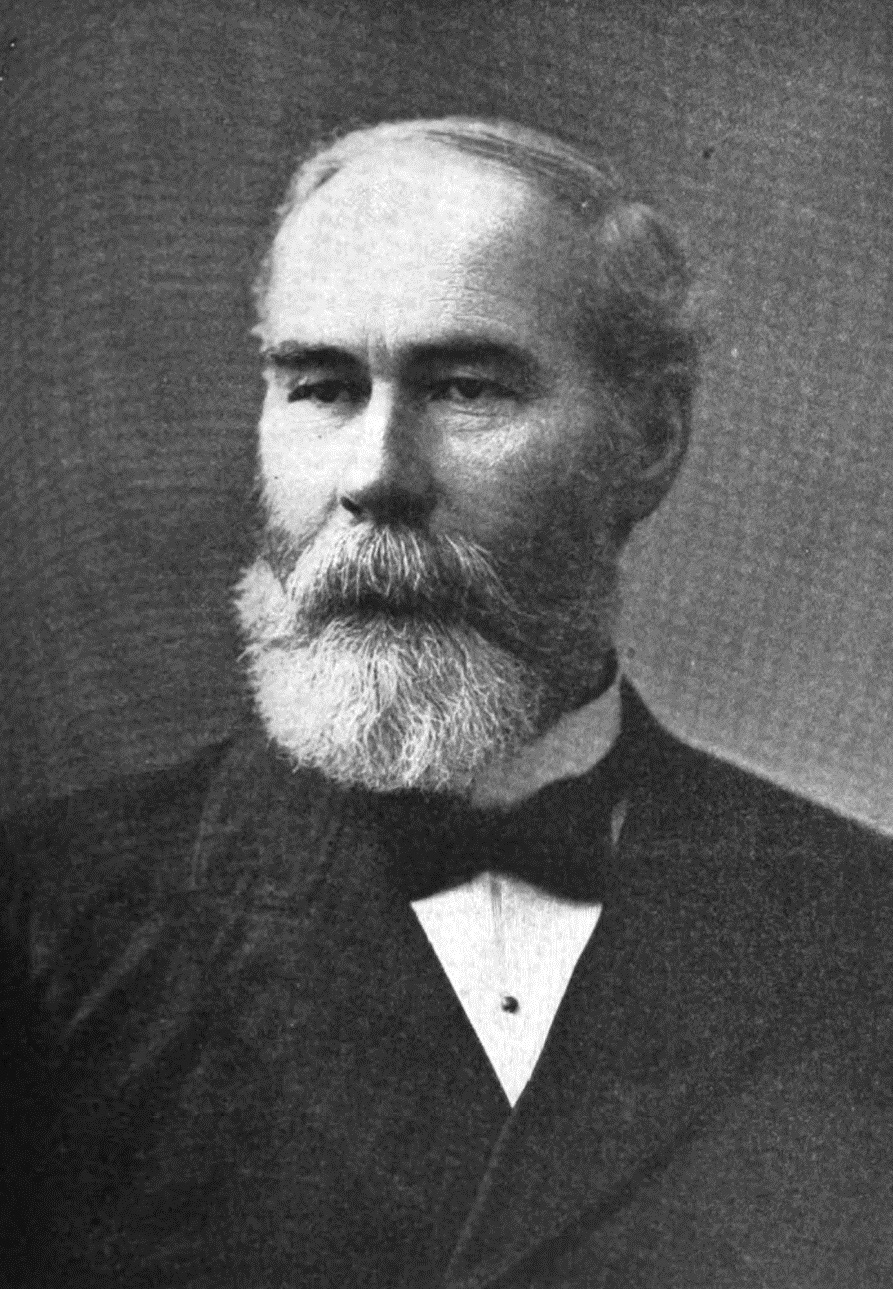
Benjamin Franklin Trueblood, prominent member of the Society.

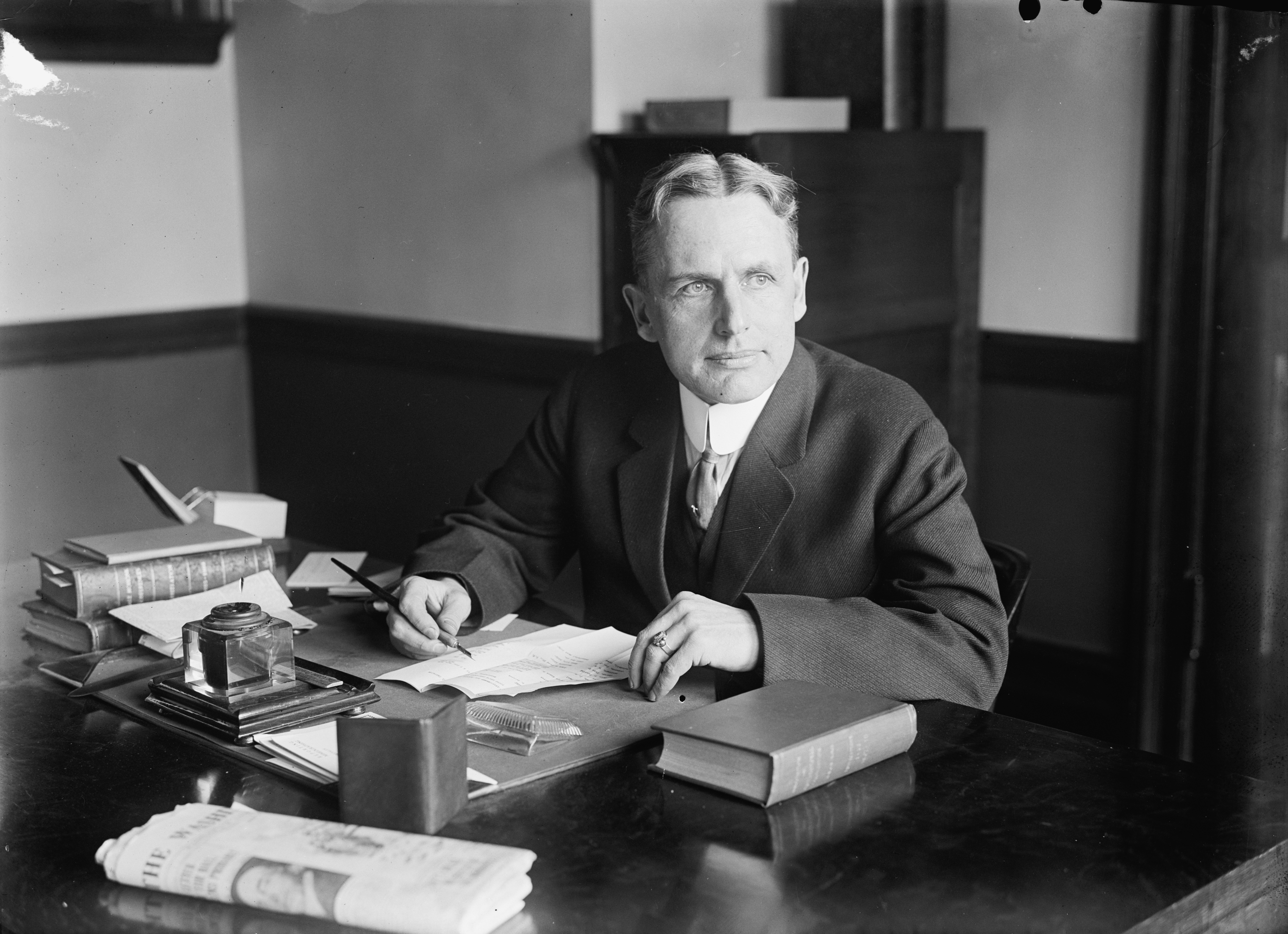
Portrait of Arthur Deerin Call of the American Peace Society, 1913

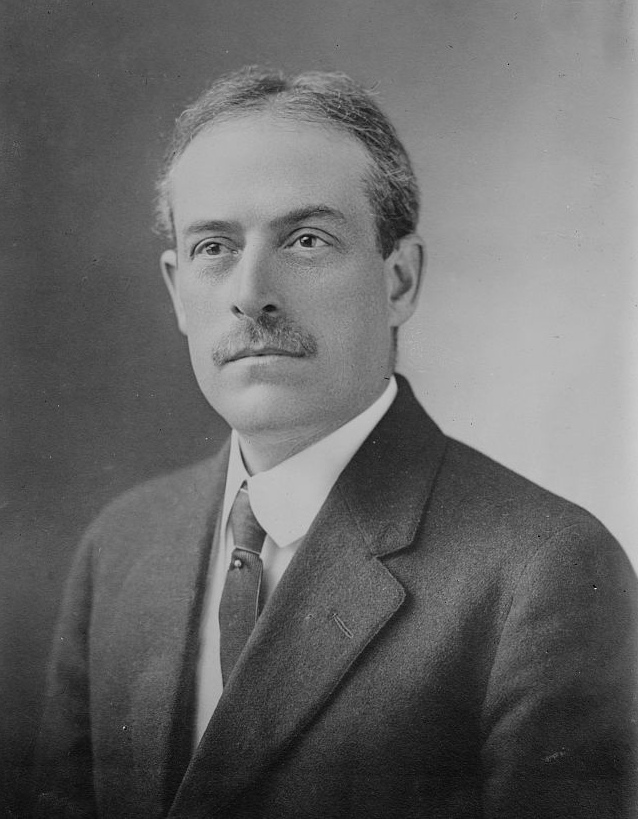
James Libby Tryon (1864–1958) of the American Peace Society in 1916. He was a professor at the Massachusetts Institute of Technology.

The American Peace Society was a pacifist group founded upon the initiative of William Ladd, in New York City, May 8, 1828. It was formed by the merging of many state and local societies, from New York, Maine, New Hampshire, and Massachusetts, of which the oldest, the New York Peace Society, dated from 1815. Ladd was an advocate of a "Congress and High Court of Nations." The society organized peace conferences and regularly published a periodical entitled Advocate of Peace. The Society was only opposed to wars between nation states; it did not oppose the American Civil War, regarding the Union's war as a "police action" against the "criminals" of the Confederacy. Its most famous leader was Benjamin Franklin Trueblood (1847–1916), a Quaker who in his book The Federation of the World (1899) called for the establishment of an international state to bring about lasting peace in the world. In 1834 the headquarters of the society were removed to Hartford, in 1834 to Boston, Massachusetts, in 1911 to Washington, D.C. The group is now based in Washington. Its official journal is World Affairs.

The American Peace Society house, its headquarters from 1911 to 1948 near the White House, is a U.S. National Historic Landmark. The American Peace Society was opposed to Zionism on the grounds of internationalism.

== History ==
In 1833, their office was listed as 129 Nassau Street in New York City, NY. As of 1834 the society operated from headquarters on Wall Street in New York City. In Boston it worked from offices on Cornhill (ca.1840s–1850s); Chauncey Street (ca.1864); Winter Street (ca.1868–1869); and Somerset Street (ca.1870s–1890s). Annual meetings took place in various venues in Boston, including Park Street Church (1851). Officers included George C. Beckwith, William Jay, Howard Malcom, John Field, William C. Brown.

== Notable people ==
- Ruth Hinshaw Spray (1848–1929), served as vice-president for 16 years

== See also ==
- Pacifism in the United States
- List of anti-war organizations
- List of peace activists
- Massachusetts Peace Society (1815–1828), one of the predecessors to the American Peace Society
- White House Peace Vigil

== Footnotes ==
- Oxford Dictionary of the U.S. Military. Oxford University Press, 2001
- Dictionary of American History by James Truslow Adams, New York: Charles Scribner's Sons, 1940
