= Holtzmann =

Holtzmann is a surname. Notable people with the surname include:

- Adelheid Holtzmann (1866–1925), German politician and women's rights activist
- Adolf Holtzmann (1810–1870), German philologist
- Fanny E. Holtzmann (1902–1980), pioneering female lawyer
- Heinrich Julius Holtzmann (1832–1910), German theologian
- Oskar Holtzmann (1859–1934), German theologian
- Robert Holtzmann (1873–1946), German Medievalist historian

== See also ==
- Holtzmann's law
