= Soziale Frauenschule =

German educational institution

Soziale Frauenschule was the name given to certain educational institutions that emerged in Germany between the turn of the century and the beginning of the 1920s.

In the course of the women's movement, they pursued the goal of vocational training for women in the welfare care sector. Another aim was to overcome the hardship of the First World War, which particularly affected women, who were to be supported by qualified female staff. The first Sociale Frauenschule (Social Women's School) was established as a further development of a training school for kindergarten teachers in Berlin in 1908, founded by Alice Salomon, who also directed the school. It offered a broad two-year training with theoretical and practical parts side by side. The teachers came from the environment of the health department and welfare office and initially taught voluntarily. By the First World War, there were 14 women's social schools in Germany.

Examples of such facilities:

Current name of the school	Place	Date of foundation	Founder
Alice Salomon University of Applied Sciences Berlin	Berlin-Schöneberg, later Berlin-Hellersdorf	15 October 1908	Alice Salomon
Friedrich-Fröbel-Schule; Fachschule für Sozialpädagogik	Mannheim	1916	Marie Bernays; Elisabeth Altmann-Gottheiner; Alice Bensheimer; Julie Bassermann
Sozialpädagogisches Institut der Hochschule für Angewandte Wissenschaften Hamburg	Hamburg	1917	Gertrud Bäumer and Marie Baum
Munich University of Applied Sciences formerly Soziale Frauenschule München; Fachschule für Sozialpädagogik	München	1919	Frieda Duensing; Anna Heim-Pohlmann from 1921
Katholische Hochschule Nordrhein-Westfalen; Abteilung Aachen	Köln later Aachen	8 November 1916	Katholischer Deutscher Frauenbund durch Hedwig Dransfeld and Helene Weber
