= Bertha Bracey =

Quaker aid worker and teacher

- Born: 1893; Bournville, West Midlands, England
- Died: 1989 (aged 95)
- Occupations: teacher, youth worker, aid worker

Bertha Lilian Bracey (1893–1989) was an English Quaker teacher and aid worker who organised relief and sanctuary for Europeans affected by the turmoil before, during and after the Second World War. These included many Jewish children threatened by the Holocaust and rescued in the operation known as the Kindertransport. In 2010, she was recognised as a British Hero of the Holocaust.

== Early life ==
Her father worked for the Quaker chocolate maker, Cadbury, in their model village of Bournville. Her mother was Annie née Miles. She went to Birmingham University and, after graduating, she worked in personnel and as a teacher for five years.

== Quaker relief work ==
She joined the Society of Friends – the Quakers – when she was about eighteen. In 1921, she left teaching to work at the Quaker Centre in Vienna where she founded and operated youth clubs. She enjoyed singing with young people and her work in these centres gave her good fluency in the German language and a network of many contacts. The Quaker International Centres had been conceived by Carl Heath in 1916 and eight of them were established across Europe after the First World War. After Vienna, Bracey moved to Germany where the hyperinflation and instability of the Weimar Republic caused great hardship. At the centres in Nuremberg and then Berlin, she organised aid for the population, especially children. The provision of food to the impoverished and starving was known as the Quäkerspeisung – the Quaker feeding – and it so endeared the Quakers to the German people that it enabled them to aid refugees during the Nazi era.

In 1929, she became an Administrative Secretary of the Germany and Holland Committee in the Quaker headquarters in London, responsible for the relief operations in Germany and the Netherlands. In 1933, she took charge of the newly-formed German Emergency Committee and this was later renamed as the Friends Committee for Refugees and Aliens. As the work expanded, her staff in Friends House grew from a single assistant to 59 case-workers in 1938 and, with crowds of refugees to process, they overflowed into Drayton House nearby.

== Schools ==
She helped found the Stoatley Rough School for German refugees in Haslemere in England. This started when Hilde Lion contacted the German Emergency Committee in 1933 with plans to form a school to help German children adjust to British education. Bracey chaired the board of governors from 1938 to 1945 and continued as a governor of the school until 1960.

In 1934, she helped establish a school for German Jewish children in the castle of Eerde in the Netherlands.

== Kindertransport ==
Bracey had recognised the threat to the Jews of Germany in 1933, after Hitler became Chancellor and the Nazi party took control, "Words are not adequate to tell of the anguish of some of my Jewish friends". After the great pogrom of Kristallnacht in 1938, she visited Berlin and was then part of the delegation which met with the British Home Secretary Sir Samuel Hoare to convince him to expedite the acceptance of Jewish children as refugees from Germany. She then led the Quaker team which formed part of the Movement for the Care of Children from Germany. Initially, they were based in Friends House but this was overcrowded and so the Palace Hotel in Bloomsbury Street was bought to become Bloomsbury House – a centre for all the refugee organisations to work together. Bracey became secretary of the Inter-Church Council for German Refugees and led a team of 80 Quaker case-workers on the third floor. During the war, she took on further duties. In 1940, after the fall of France caused concern about the security risk of having German refugees in Britain resulting in internment, she led the Central Department for Interned Refugees which addressed the practical and humanitarian issues arising from this policy. At the end of the war, she was still saving children. For example, in 1945, she arranged for the RAF to fly 300 orphans from Theresienstadt concentration camp to a reception centre by Windermere.

== Later life ==
In the aftermath of the war, there were many displaced persons so she joined the Allied Control Commission to handle refugees in Germany. Later she was made responsible for women's affairs in the American and British Zones of Occupation. She then retired from this post in 1953, having reached the age of 60.

In the 1960s she moved to a flat in Langton Green, near Tunbridge Wells, in the block next door to her sister Emily. Later she moved to East House in Adderbury, near Banbury, where she lived until her death. She remained cheerful, alert and an inspiration to others.

'Is there anything I can bring you?' asked a visitor of hers in her nursing home during her last days. Bertha roused herself from a partial slumber to the alertness we remember so well, 'Yes,' she responded, 'bring me glad tidings of great joy.'

During her last years, she told the story of how she used to take false papers to the Jews she was helping to escape from Germany in the 30s. Knowing that if she were caught with these she would be arrested and in serious trouble, her strategy was to play up the role of a slightly dotty, middle-aged schoolmistress by approaching every man in uniform and asking "Do I need to show you my papers?". She was quickly hurried on and so her mission was accomplished.

== Awards and memorials ==
In 1942, she was awarded the Order of the British Empire (OBE) for her services to refugees. In 1999, a rose was dedicated to her at the Beth Shalom Holocaust Centre. In 2010, she was recognised as a British Hero of the Holocaust by Prime Minister Gordon Brown. Naomi Blake, who was herself a survivor of Auschwitz, sculpted a statue dedicated to Bertha Bracey and it is now on display in Friends House. The inscription reads

To honour Bertha Bracey (1893–1989) who gave practical leadership to Quakers in quietly rescuing and re-settling thousands of Nazi victims and lone children between 1933 and 1948

== Publications ==
- Bracey, Bertha (1944), "Europe's Displaced Persons and the Problems of Relocation", International Affairs, 20 (2), Royal Institute of International Affairs: 225–243, doi:10.2307/3018099, JSTOR 3018099
