= Edith Mendelssohn Bartholdy =

German politician and social activist

Edith Louise Ida Mendelssohn Bartholdy, née Speyer, (born January 6, 1882 in Berlin; died July 9, 1969 in Cologne) was a German politician and social activist.

== Education and career ==
Edith Speyer received the usual education for girls of her class at the time. After completing secondary school, she decided to become a teacher, against her father's wishes. At the age of 19, Edith Speyer successfully passed the teacher's examination for secondary girls' schools in her hometown. She then taught at the Königin-Luisen Foundation in Berlin. On November 6, 1905, at the age of 23, Edith Speyer married the banker Ludwig Mendelssohn Bartholdy, a son of the chemist Paul Mendelssohn Bartholdy and grandson of the composer Felix Mendelssohn.

In 1908, Edith Mendelssohn Bartholdy and her husband Ludwig embarked on an extended trip around the world, accompanied by the painter Heinrich Hübner. They spent over five months in China, Japan and North America. After returning from their trip after about two years, the Mendelssohn Bartholdy couple moved to Leipzig. There, Ludwig Mendelssohn Bartholdy took over the management of a bank branch, while his wife became involved in the city's social and cultural politics on a voluntary basis. She and her husband became "members of the Leipziger Kunstverein, the Verein der Leipziger Jahresausstellungen (LJA) and the Gesellschaft der Freunde des Kunstgewerbemuseums (GFKGM), to which Edith Mendelssohn Bartholdy donated several valuable pieces from China and Japan".

In 1912, she co-founded the Leipziger Krippen Verein e. V. (Leipzig Crèche Association) to combat high infant mortality. The first crèche, which had room for 18 children, was opened on March 10, 1912. In response to high demand, a second nursery was opened on October 13, 1912. Motherless children, orphans and children of single mothers were given priority. In both crèches, Mendelssohn Bartholdy organized courses to train young girls and women in the care of infants and small children.

A member of the Association for Maternity Protection, she was elected chairman in 1916. During the First World War, she worked to expand the crèche system as an expert at the Women's Employment Center in Berlin. She set up "wartime crèches", "factory crèches" and, in particular, "nursing crèches and parlours" near factories throughout Germany so that the children of working mothers would be well looked after.

Her husband was killed near Bolovsk on October 14, 1918.

In 1930, Mendelssohn Bartholdy took over the chairmanship of the Leipzig chapter of the GEDOK, which was founded in the same year. A year later, the first exhibition of women artists was held in Leipzig. In 1933, she published a book about German women artists.

== Nazi era ==
When the National Socialists came to power, she was persecuted because of her Jewish heritage. Forced out of all her positions, she emigrated to England in 1936. There she was employed at the Stoatley Rough School, founded and run by Hilde Lion. Her brother, the writer Wilhelm Speyer, fled the Nazis in 1933, his books banned because of his Jewish heritage. He lived the rest of his life in various countries, dying in Switzerland in 1952. Her other brother, Peter Ernst Hans Willy Speyer, was deported by the Nazis and is thought to have been murdered at Auschwitz in 1943.

== Later life ==
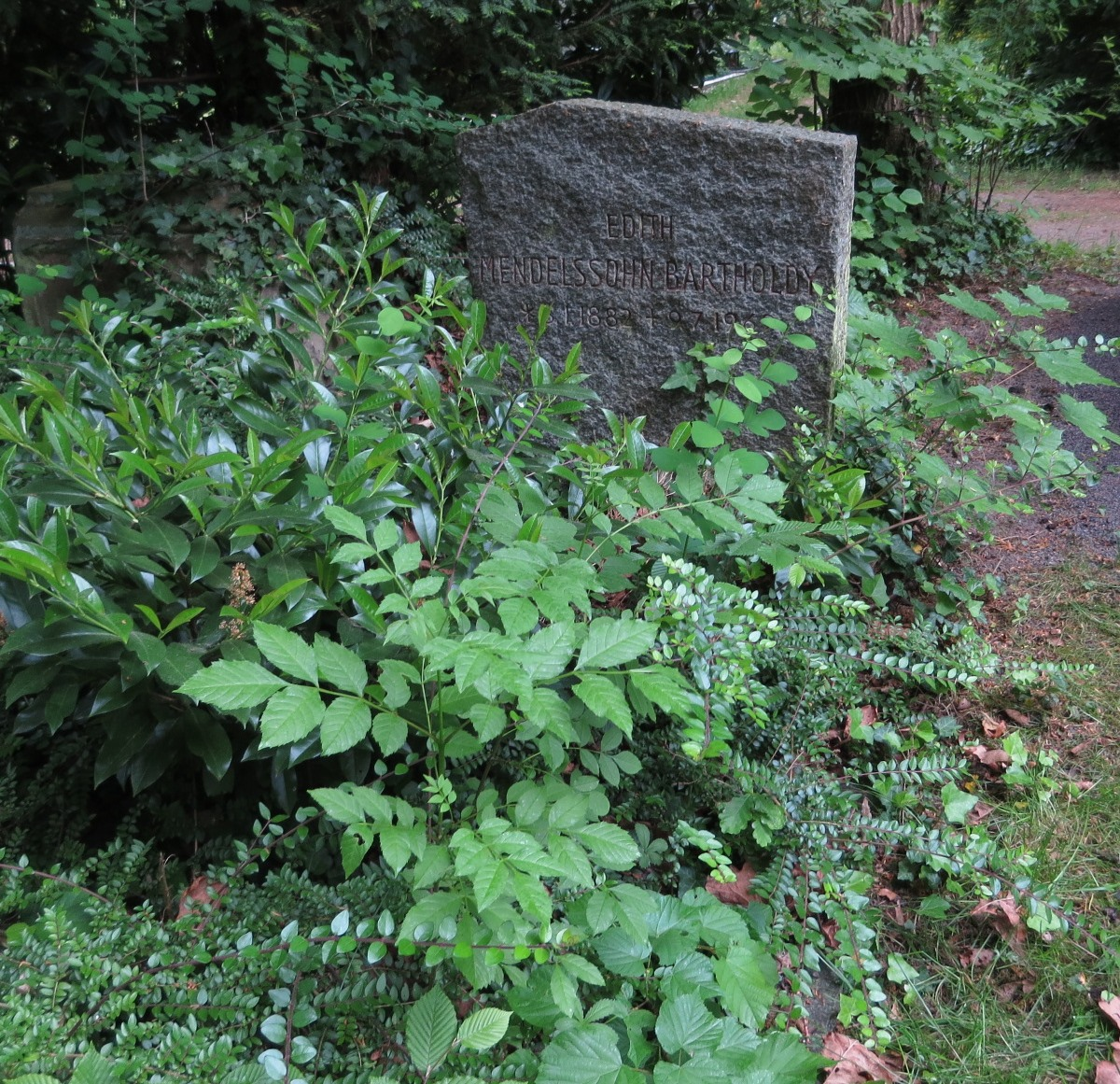
Grave at the Melaten cemetery

In the mid-1950s, Edith Mendelssohn Bartholdy moved to Cologne, where she initially lived in Marienburg. A few years before her death, she moved into the Riehler Heimstätten, a municipal retirement home that had been built in 1926 on the initiative of Hertha Kraus in a former barracks. Until the end, she was interested in the older generation, by whose "often sad situation" she was shaken. She advocated that people should not be left without work in old age, "because nothing makes you old and ill faster than inactivity". According to a dedication to Der Lebensabend, she had a seventy-year friendship with Therese Frank.

Her grave is in the Melaten cemetery in Cologne (lit. G, between lit. C+D).

== Publications ==
- Krippen im Kriege, in: Krippenzeitung 1917, S. 33 ff.
- Industrie und Kinderfürsorge, in: Krippenzeitung 1917, S. 72 ff.
- Neugründungen von Krippen. Voranschlag für Einrichtung und Betrieb einer Krippe, in: Krippenzeitung 1918, S. 7 ff.
- Die deutsche Künstlerin. Ein Gedenkbuch, Leipzig 1933
- Der Lebensabend, Gütersloh 1959

== Literature ==
- Rita Jorek: Edith Mendelssohn Bartholdy (1882–1969). Sozial- und Kulturpolitikerin; in: Louise-Otto-Peters-Gesellschaft e.V. Leipzig (Hrsg.): Leipziger Lerchen. Frauen erinnern, 2. Folge; Leipzig 2000, S. 32 ff.
- Marie-Luise Nissen: Edith Mendelssohn Bartholdy (1882–1969) – Ihr Beitrag zur Entstehung und Entwicklung der Kinderkrippe in Deutschland Anfang des 20. Jahrhunderts; München 1999 (unveröffentlichte Diplomarbeit).
- Sebastian Panwitz: Edith Mendelssohn Bartholdy. Lebenserinnerungen (Teil I); in: Mendelssohn-Studien 20 (2017), S. 187–226.
- Sebastian Panwitz: Edith Mendelssohn Bartholdy. Lebenserinnerungen (Teil II); in: Mendelssohn-Studien 21 (2019), S. 265–302.

== See also ==
- The Holocaust
- History of the Jews in Germany
- Nuremberg Laws
- Julius Meier-Graefe
