= Alice Salomon =

German social reformer (1872–1948)

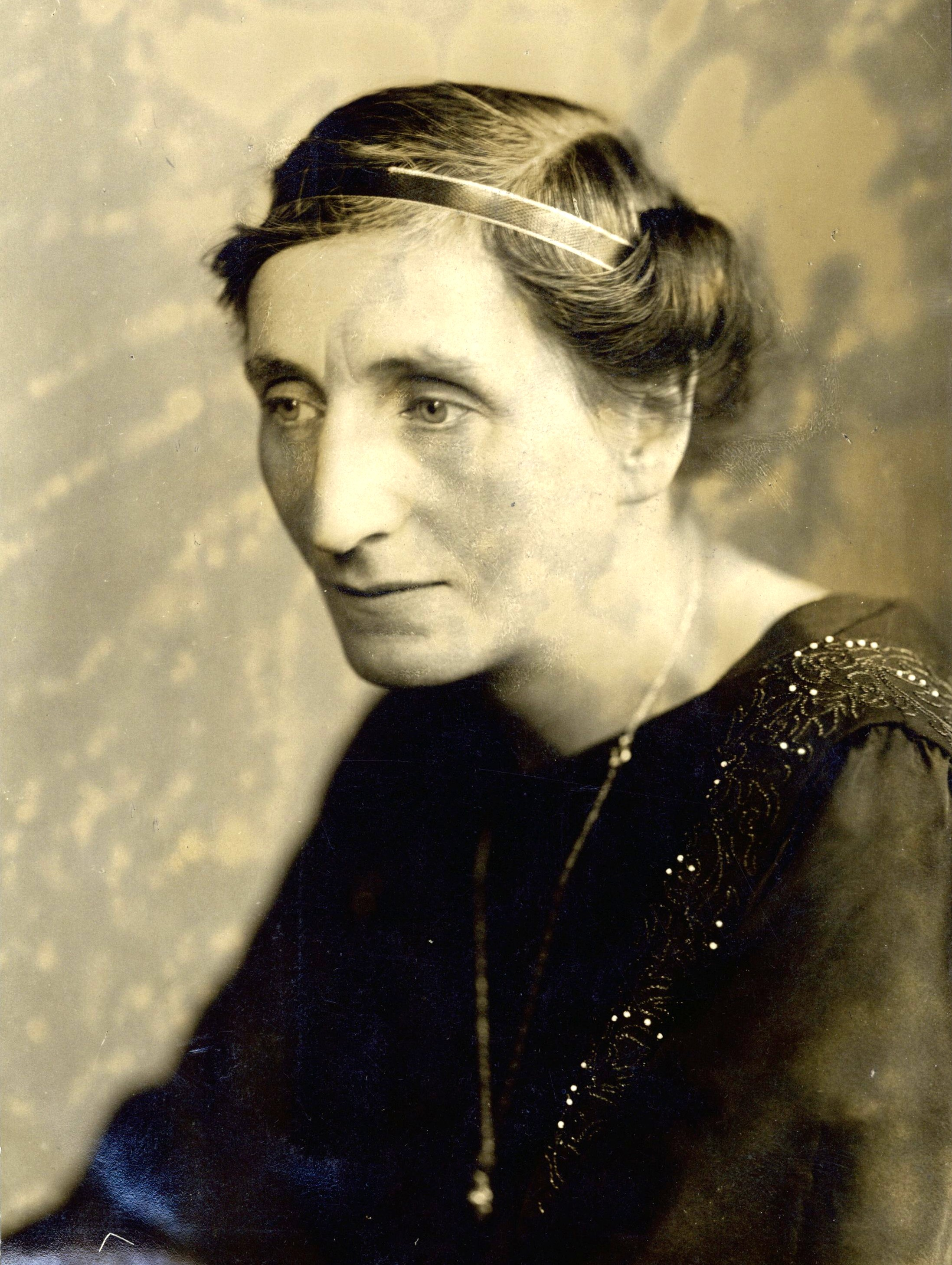
- Alice Salomon
- Born: 19 April 1872; Berlin, Germany
- Died: 30 August 1948 (aged 76); New York, U.S.
- Occupations: Social reformer and pioneer of social work

Alice Salomon (19 April 1872 – 30 August 1948) was a German social reformer and pioneer of social work as an academic discipline. Her role was so important to German social work that the Deutsche Bundespost (German post office) issued a commemorative postage stamp about her in 1989. A university, a park and a square in Berlin are all named after her.

== Life and career ==
Alice Salomon was the third of eight children, and the second daughter, of Albert and Anna Salomon. Like many girls from affluent families in this period, she was denied further education, despite her ambition to become a teacher. This ended in 1893 when she was 21, and she recorded in her autobiography that this was "when her life began".

In 1900 she joined the Bund Deutscher Frauenvereine ("Federation of German Women's Associations" – BDF hereinafter). In due course she was elected deputy chairperson, and kept this role until 1920. (The Chairperson was Gertrud Bäumer). The organisation supported destitute, abandoned, or single mothers and aimed to prevent their children being neglected.

From 1902 to 1906 she studied economics at the Friedrich Wilhelm University in Berlin, though she had no relevant qualification. Her publications were sufficient for university entrance. She earned her doctorate in 1908 with a dissertation entitled Die Ursachen der ungleichen Entlohnung von Männer- und Frauenarbeit (loosely, "Causes of Pay Inequality Between Men and Women"). Also in this year she founded a Soziale Frauenschule ("Social Women's School") in Berlin, which was renamed "Alice Salomon School" in 1932 and is now called Alice-Salomon-Fachhochschule für Sozialarbeit und Sozialpädagogik Berlin ("Alice Salomon College of Further Education for Social Work and Social Sciences of Berlin").

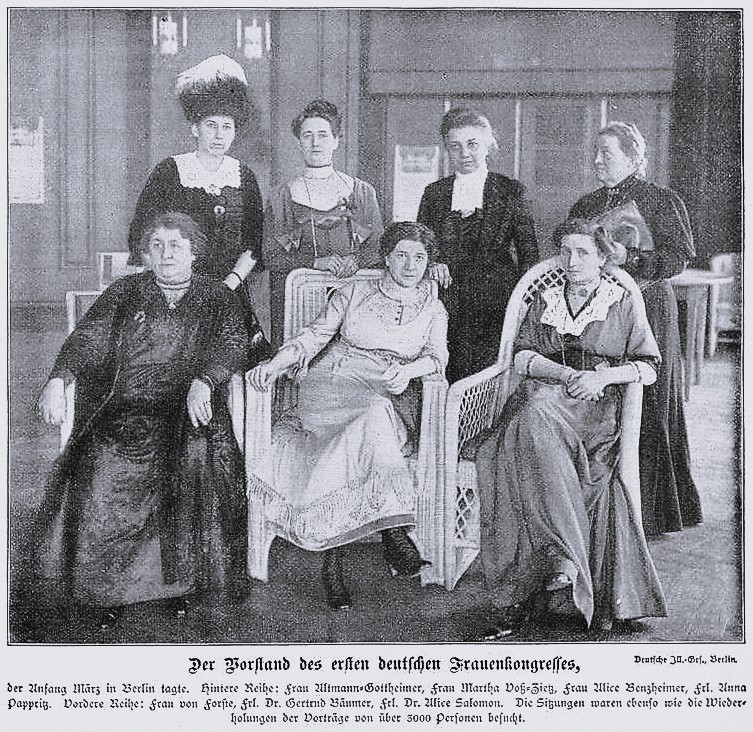
The Board of Directors of the German Women's Congress 1912 (German: Deutscher Frauenkongreß), including (back row from the left): Elisabeth Altmann-Gottheiner, Martha Voß-Zietz, Alice Bensheimer, Anna Pappritz, (front row from the left) Helene von Forster, Gertrud Bäumer and Salomon

In 1909 she became secretary of the Internationalen Frauenbund (International Council of Women). She converted from Judaism to the Lutheran Church in 1914. In 1917 she was made chairperson of the Konferenz sozialer Frauenschulen Deutschlands ("Conference of German Women's Social Schools") that she herself had founded; by 1919 sixteen schools belonged to it.

In 1920 she resigned from the BDF from fear of antisemitic propaganda. Five years later, she founded the Deutsche Akademie für soziale und pädagogische Frauenarbeit ("German Academy for Women's Social and Educational Work") which was directed by Hilde Lion. Speakers at this institution included Albert Einstein, Carl Gustav Jung, Helene Weber and others of similar eminence.

In the late 1920s and early 1930s, this organisation published thirteen monographs on the social and economic conditions faced by the poor in Germany. For Alice Salomon's 60th birthday, she received an honorary doctorate from Berlin University and the Silver State Medal from the Prussian State Ministry.

=== Treatment by the Nazis ===
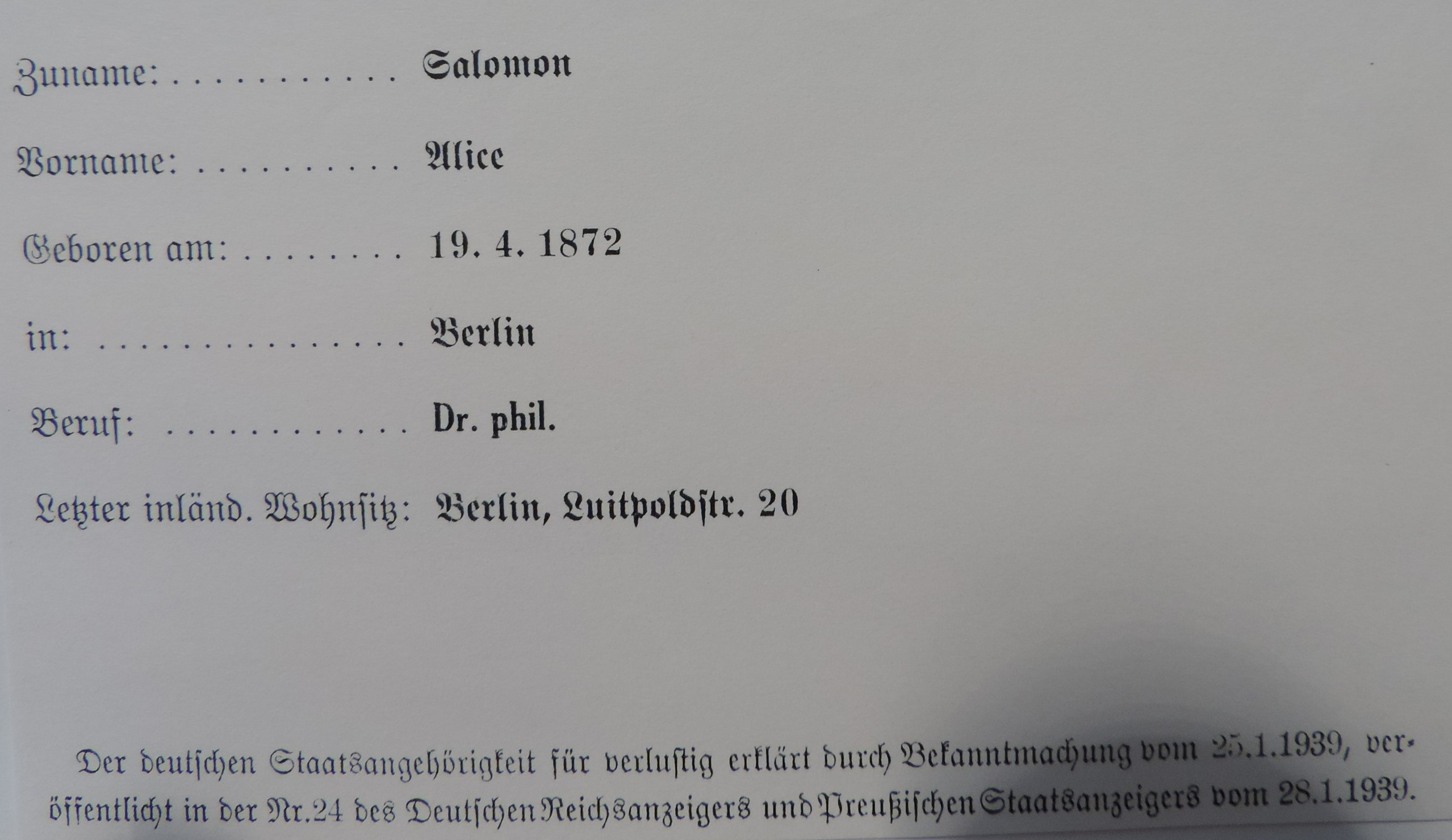
Document of her deprivation of German citizenship from 25 January 1939

In 1933 when they acceded to power, the Nazi party stripped her of all her offices and six years later, when she was 65, she faced interrogation by the Gestapo. The Nazis objected to Salomon's Jewish origins, her Christian humanist ideas, her pacifism and international reputation. She was expelled from Germany, where she had been running a relief committee for Jewish emigrants.

She went to New York, her German citizenship and her two doctorates having been taken from her. In 1944 she became an American citizen. A year later, she was honorary President of the International Women's Federation and the International Association of Schools of Social Work.

She died in New York on 30 August 1948.

== Tribute ==
On 19 April 2018, Google Doodle commemorated her 146th birthday.

== Selected publications ==
- Character is Destiny: the autobiography of Alice Salomon, edited by Andrew Lees, Ann Arbor: University of Michigan Press, 2004, ISBN 0472113674
- Charakter ist Schicksal, Lebenserinnerungen, herausgegeben von Rüdiger Baron und Rolf Landwehr, Weinheim und Basel: Beltz Verlag, 1983 ISBN 3-407-85036-0 (Auszug in: Lixl-Purcell (Hg) (in German)
- Erinnerungen deutsch-jüdischer Frauen 1900 – 1990 Reclam, Lpz. 1992 u.ö. ISBN 3-379-01423-0 S. 120 – 125) (in German)

== Selected bibliography ==
Translator's note: These are in German.

- Elga Kern, Führende Frauen Europas, Sammelbuch, München 1927
- Muthesius, Hans, hrsg, Alice Salomon, die Begründerin des sozialen Frauenberufs in Deutschland, ihr Leben und ihr Werk. [von Dora Peyser et al.], Köln, C. Heymann 1958
- Margarete Hecker: Sozialpädagogische Forschung: Der Beitrag der Deutschen Akademie für soziale und pädagogische Forschung. In: Soziale Arbeit. 1984/Nr. 2, S. 106–121
- Joachim Wieler: Er-Innerung eines zerstörten Lebensabends – Alice Salomon während der NS-Zeit (1933–37) und im Exil (1937–48). Lingbach, Darmstadt 1987, ISBN 3-923982-01-1
- Manfred Berger: Alice Salomon. Pionierin der sozialen Arbeit und der Frauenbewegung. Brandes & Apsel, Frankfurt am Main 1998. ISBN 3-86099-276-7
- Carola Kuhlmann: Alice Salomon. Ihr Lebenswerk als Beitrag zur Entwicklung der Theorie und Praxis sozialer Arbeit. Deutscher Studienverlag, Weinheim 2000, ISBN 3-89271-927-6
- Gudrun Deuter: Darstellung und Analyse der Vortragszyklen an der Deutschen Akademie für soziale und pädagogische Frauenarbeit in den Jahren 1925–1932. Bonn 2001 (unveröffentl. Diplomarbeit)
- Norbert Rühle: Jeanette Schwerin. Ihr Leben, ihr Werk und ihre Bedeutung für die Soziale Arbeit heute, München 2001 (unveröffentlichte Diplomarbeit)
- Anja Schüler: Frauenbewegung und soziale Reform. Jane Addams und Alice Salomon im transatlantischen Dialog, 1889–1933. Franz Steiner Verlag, Stuttgart 2004, ISBN 3-515-08411-8
- Manfred Berger: Frauen in sozialer Verantwortung: Alice Salomon. In: Unsere Jugend. 2008/Nr. 10, S. 430–433
- Deborah Sharon Abeles (DESSA): The Art of Remembrance: Alice Salomon. Die Kunst des Gedenkens: Alice Salomon. Hentrich & Hentrich Verlag Leipzig 2018, ISBN 978-3-95565-293-7

== Sources ==
This article was abridged and translated from de:Alice Salomon in the German Wikipedia on 28 March 2009.
