= Emmy Wolff =

German-British sociologist, educator, poet

- Born: 25 December 1890; Bernburg an der Saale, Duchy of Anhalt, German Empire
- Died: 9 November 1969 (aged 78); Haslemere, Surrey, England
- Education: University for Women; University of Frankfurt
- Occupations: Educator, welfare worker, poet
- Parents: Paul Wolff (father); Julie Fliess (mother)

Emmy Wolff (25 December 1890 in Bernburg an der Saale – 9 November 1969 in Haslemere, Surrey, England) was a German-British sociologist, educator, poet and women's movement publicist and activist.

== Life and work ==
Emmy was the eldest of three children of the banker Paul Wolff and his wife Julie Fliess who volunteered in the local Jewish community. Wolff attended a high school for girls and then a girls' boarding school. From 1915 to 1918 she graduated from the University for Women in Leipzig. She then continued her studies in Munich and Frankfurt. Wolff graduated as a social and administrative officer. In 1924 she received her doctorate at the University of Frankfurt about a girls' club and the origin of its members, which discussed the problem of school age girls leaving female youth care.

In 1925, Wolff became an assistant to the Reichstag politician Gertrud Bäumer, who appointed her to the editorial team of the magazine Die Hilfe. From 1927 to 1931 she was managing director of the Bund Deutscher Frauenvereine (BDF). In this function she edited the News bulletin of the Bund Deutscher Frauenvereine with Alice Bensheimer for three years. In addition, Wolff published the yearbook of the women's movement 1927/28-31 on behalf of the BDF and published articles for the bourgeois-conservative magazine of the women's movement Die Frau. She was also a lecturer at the Active at the German Academy for Social and Educational Women's Work and in the social education seminar of the youth home association.

Wolff, who was Jewish, fled Germany in 1935 for England and joined the staff at Stoatley Rough School to teach German language and German literature. She became second in command at the school in 1937 after Hilde Lion (1893-1970) who was also Wolff's partner of many years, Lion had founded the school as a Quaker institution. The two women worked at Stoatley Rough School for many years even after they ended their personal relationship.

In 1957 Emmy Wolff retired and died 9 November 1969 in Haslemere, Surrey, England

== Selected works ==
- The social youth communities, their development and their goal, in: Die Frau 1920, vol. 28, H. 3
- A girls' club and the circle of origin of its members. A contribution to the problem of registration of school-leaved female youth by youth welfare, Frankfurt a/M. 1924 (unpublished dissertation)
- Generations of women in pictures, Berlin 1928
- Female students in the daily novel of today, in: Die Frau 1928, vol. 36, p. 482
- "Women in Need". Reflections on an art exhibition, in: Die Frau 1931, vol. 39, H. 2, pp. 99–104
- The woman in the German people. Overall impression of the Berlin 1933 exhibition [Women in family, home and work], in: Die Frau, H. 7, vol. 40, pp. 421–432
- Hymns to Loneliness, in: Der Morgen, 1935/36, Issue 11, p. 490
- The social youth communities, their becoming and their goal, in: Third generation. For Gertrud Baeumer, ed. by Hilde Lion, Irmgard Rathgen and Else Ulich-Beil,
