= Julie Bassermann =

German women's right activist

Julie Bassermann (born Julie Ladenburg: 2 March 1860 - 18 September 1940) was a German women's rights activist.

== Life ==
=== Family provenance and early years ===
Julie Ladenburg was born in Mannheim (which is also the city in which, eighty years later, she died). Her father, Carl Ladenburg (1827–1909), was a banker. Her mother, born Ida Goldschmidt (1840–1928) was, like her daughter, active in the women's movement. The Ladenburgs were considered one of Mannheim's leading Jewish families. Her parents had two recorded children, but Julie was their only daughter. In 1881 she married the ambitious Mannheim lawyer-politician Ernst Bassermann. For the young protestant lawyer Ernst Bassermann, the marriage opened up the opportunity to network among Mannheim's most prosperous circles. Three daughters and one son were born to the couple: at least two of the children would predecease their mother.

=== Women's rights ===
In 1897 Julie Bassermann founded the Mannheim section of the "Verein Frauenbildung - Frauenstudium" (loosely, "Women's Study and Training League"), teaming up with Alice Bensheimer, who rapidly became a friend, to build up the organisation, of which she became president in 1901. As she became established in the role, she led a fusion of various activist women's organisations in Mannheim into a single body. One side-effect of this was the chance to work closely with her mother: in 1904 Ida Ladenburg (1840–1928) became president of the "Baden Women's Association" ("Badische Frauenverein"). Julie Bassermann was involved with the "Hausfrauverein" (loosely, "Housewives' Association"). She also served, between 1911 and 1933, as founding president of the "Badische Verband für Frauenbestrebungen" (loosely, "Baden Association for Women's Endeavours").

=== Political engagement ===
From 1912, Bassermann, along with Adelheid Steinmann, became a member of the National Women's Committee of Germany's National Liberal Party ("Nationalliberale Partei" / NLP). War broke out (from a German perspective) on 1 August 1914, with Germany's declaration of war against Russia, following a Russian general military mobilisation the previous day. Despite having celebrated his sixtieth birthday less than a week earlier, Ernst Bassermann immediately volunteered for military service: Julie Bassermann, on 3 August 1914, organised a Mannheim local group of the "Nationaler Frauendienst" ("...Women's Service"), a national organisation set up three days earlier, which saw itself as providing the female equivalent of the frontline service given by men. In 1915 she was involved in the construction of a day centre for jobless women and girls. A year later she got together with Marie Bernays, her friend Alice Bensheimer and Elisabeth Altmann-Gottheiner to create a Soziale Frauenschule ("Social Women's School"), (Note: The term "Welfare School" ("Wohlfahrtsschule") is also sometimes used) in Mannheim. in order to provide "social vocational training for paid and voluntary work". (Note: "...soziale Berufsausbildung für besoldete und ehrenamtliche Arbeit.")

By the start of 1919, the war was over. The emperor was gone, and even as a succession of predominantly localised revolutions broke out, mainly in the ports and cities, it was possible to view a republican future with a certain measure of cautious hope or even, some said, optimism. Julie Bassermann had been a widow for a year and a half. It was a time for a new start. On 19 January 1919 she stood as a DVP ("People's Party") candidate for election to the "National Assembly" ("Nationalversammlung"), the constitutional convention which became the first parliament of the German Republic (later renamed contemptuously by Adolf Hitler and subsequent historians as the "Weimar Republic"). This was the first German general election in which women were allowed to vote. The voting age had been reduced since 1912 from 25 to 20, and the old constituency based voting system which had disproportionately favoured conservative rural areas was replaced with a more democratic proportional representation voting process. Slightly more than 12 million voters had voted in the previous election in 1912. In 1919 more than 30 million voted. Despite these democratic advances, Julie Bassermann failed to secure election. She now pursued her political ambitions with greater success at a municipal level. She became a member of the Mannheim city council, where she served for four years as a member of the council's schools commission and involved herself in socio-political matters.

During her later years, till 1929, Julie Bassermann served as national chairwoman for the "Verein Frauenbildung - Frauenstudium" (loosely, "Women's Study and Training League"). She retired some months short of her seventieth birthday. On 18 September 1940, Julie Bassermann died at age 80.
