= Zietz =

Zietz is a surname. Notable people with the name include:

- Jennifer Zietz (born 1983), German football player
- Luise Zietz (1865-1922), German politician
- Martha Voß-Zietz (1871–1961), German women's rights activist
- Sebastian Zietz, American surfer
