= Marie Bernays =

German politician (1883–1939)

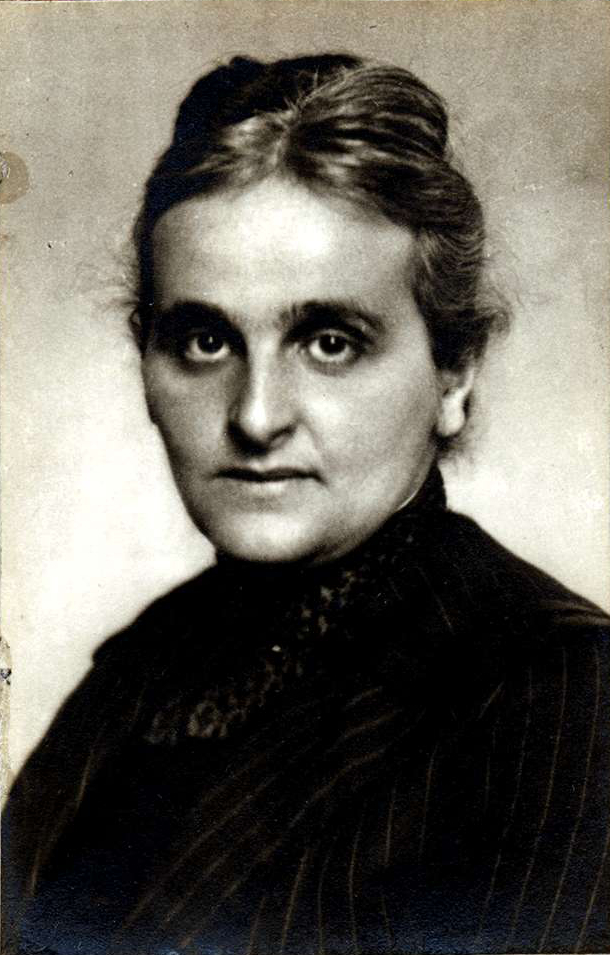
- Marie Bernays, circa 1921
- Born: 13 May 1883; Munich, German Empire
- Died: 22 April 1939 (aged 55); Beuron, Germany
- Occupations: Politician; educator; writer; women's rights activist

Marie Bernays (13 May 1883 – 22 April 1939) was a German politician, educator, writer and women's rights activist. She co-founded the Mannheim Women's Social School and served in the Landtag of the Republic of Baden from 1921 until 1925 as a member of the Deutsche Volkspartei.

== Biography ==
Bernays was born in Munich in 1883 and moved with her family to Karlsruhe in 1890. The family moved again in 1905 to Heidelberg, where Bernays sat her Abitur at the humanities-oriented Humanistisches Gymnasium in 1906. From 1906 to 1912, she studied economics at Heidelberg University. Bernays' family was Jewish but converted to Protestantism; her father, Michael Bernays, was a professor of literary history at the Ludwig-Maximilians-Universität München, and her mother was Louise née Rübke. She had two brothers, Hermann Uhde-Bernays (1873–1965), an art historian, and Ulrich Bernays (1881–1948), an academic.

Together with Elisabeth Altmann-Gottheiner, Julie Bassermann and Alice Bensheimer, in 1916, she founded the Mannheim Soziale Frauenschule (Women's Social School), and from 1919 to 1932 Bernays served as the school's director. She collaborated with the communist revolutionary Eugen Leviné in 1919 to host discussion evenings in Heidelberg. In 1920, she stood as a candidate for the Deutsche Volkspartei (DVP; German People's Party) in the Weimar Reichstag elections; she appeared at fourteenth on the party's national list. She was elected to the Baden Landtag – the parliament of the Republic of Baden – in 1921 and held her seat until 1925. She wrote many articles and pamphlets on topics including women's role in a democratic society, child-rearing, and social welfare.

In 1933, distressed by the rise of Nazism and the DVP's shift towards right-wing politics, she entered a convent and converted to Roman Catholicism. She died of natural causes in 1939 in Beuron.

== Bibliography ==
- —— (1910). Die Geschichte einer Baumwollspinnerei ihr Produktionsprozess und ihre Arbeiterschaft [The History of a Cotton Mill, its Production Process and its Workforce] (Thesis) (in German). University of Heidelberg. OCLC 681741277.
- Morgenstern, Max; Keck, Karl; Bernays, Marie (1912). Auslese und Anpassung der Arbeiterschaft : in der Lederwaren-, Steinzeug- und Textilindustrie [Selection and Adaptation of the Workforce in the Leather Goods, Stoneware and Textile Industries]. Verein für Socialpolitik.; Schriften des Vereins für Sozialpolitik; Untersuchungen über Auslese und Anpassung (Berufswahl und Berufsschicksal) der Arbeiter in den verschiedenen Zweigen der Grossindustrie (in German). Leipzig: Duncker & Humblot. OCLC 56194679.
- —— (1916). Untersuchungen über den zusammenhang von frauenfabrikarbeit und geburtenhäufigkeit in Deutschland [Studies on the relationship between women's factory work and the frequency of births in Germany] (in German). Berlin: W. Moeser. OCLC 612930059.
- —— (1920). Die Deutsche Frauenbewegung [The German women's movement] (in German). Leipzig; Berlin: B.G. Teubner. OCLC 12678307.
