= Holtmann =

Holtmann is a surname. Notable people with the surname include:

- Alexander Holtmann (born 1978), Finnish-German actor
- Chris Holtmann (born 1971), American basketball coach
- Felix Holtmann (born 1944), Canadian politician
- Gerrit Holtmann (born 1995), German footballer
- Mina Fürst Holtmann (born 1995); Norwegian alpine skier

== See also ==
- Holtzmann
