= National Peace Council (United Kingdom) =

British peace organization

The National Peace Council (NPC), founded in 1908 and disbanded in 2000, acted as the co-ordinating body for almost 200 groups across Britain, with a membership ranging from small village peace groups to national trade unions and local authorities. The groups were all united in their interest in peace, human rights, justice and the environment.

== History and operations ==
The group originated in 1904 or 1905 as the National Council of Peace Societies, but it was permanently established as the National Peace Council after the 17th Universal Peace Conference took place in London in 1908.

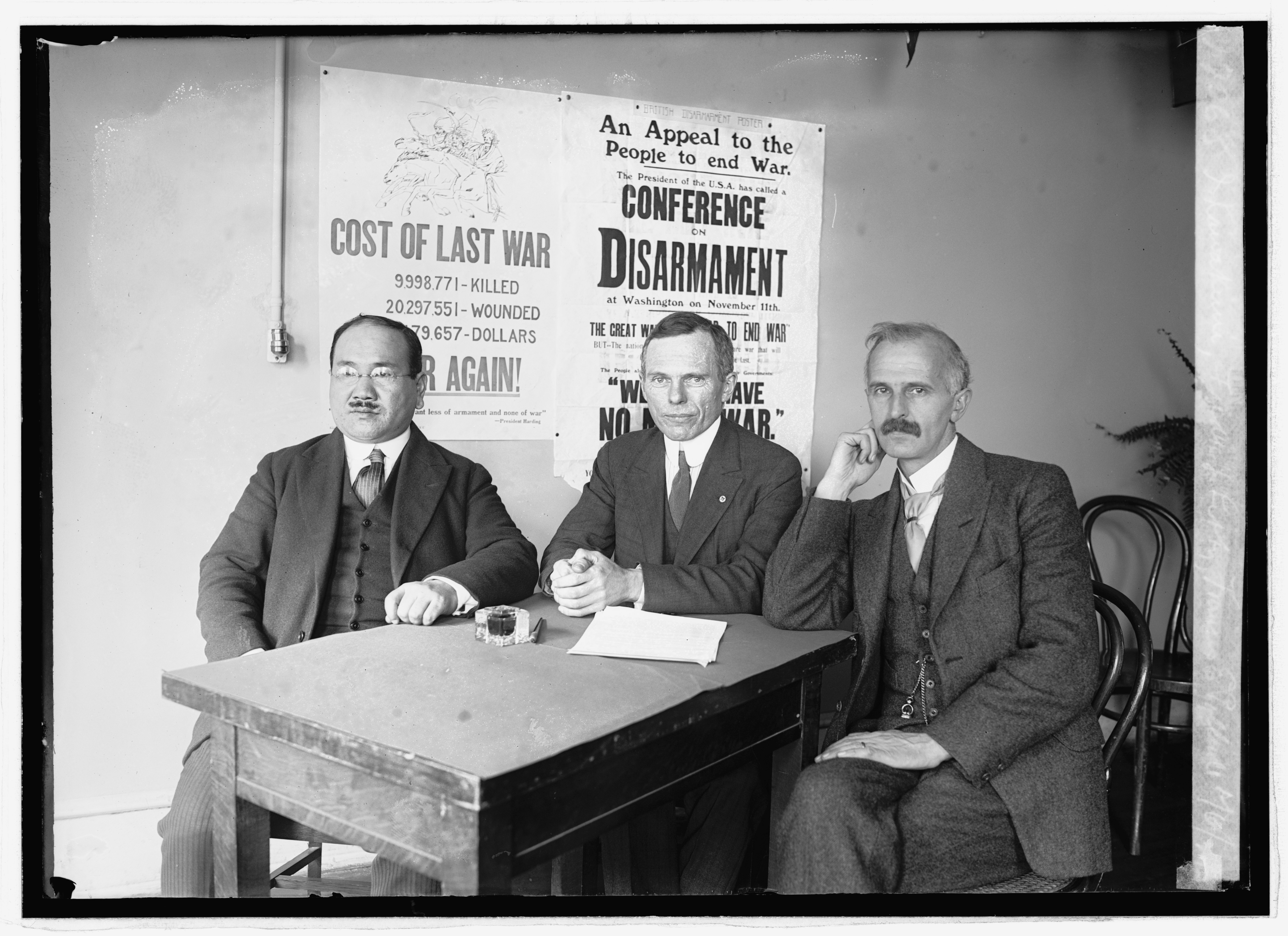
Pollard (r)

Carl Heath was appointed General Secretary and was succeeded in 1919 by Francis E. Pollard, who served until 1921, when James Hindle Hudson assumed the position.

Later secretaries included Rennie Smith, Sheila Oakes and Gerald Bailey.

A major task in its early years was organizing the National Peace Congress, which also arranged conferences on specific issues. Arthur Stanley Eddington served as chair from 1941 to 1943. Marian Cripps, Baroness Parmoor, served as vice-president.

During the Gulf War, the NPC organised the Gulf Crisis Working Group, a coalition of several groups that called for the withdrawal of Iraq from Kuwait, an end to hostilities in the region and a peace conference to resolve the issues that had caused the war.

In 2001, another organisation, Network for Peace, was set up to continue the networking role of the National Peace Council.

== See also ==
- List of peace activists

== Archives ==
- Catalogue of the papers of the National Peace Council at the Archives Division of the London School of Economics.
- Swarthmore College Library, Pennsylvania.
