= Heinrich Julius Holtzmann =

German theologian

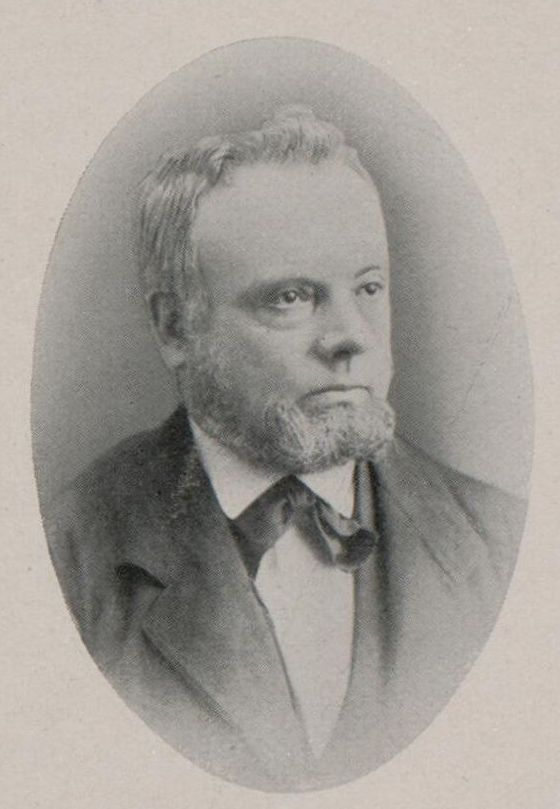
Heinrich Holtzmann

Heinrich Julius Holtzmann (7 May 1832 – 4 August 1910), German Protestant theologian, son of theologian Karl Julius Holtzmann (1804–1877), was born at Karlsruhe, where his father ultimately became prelate and counsellor to the supreme consistory (Evangelischer Oberkirchenrat) of the Evangelical State Church in Baden.

== Biography ==
He studied at Berlin, and eventually (1874) was appointed professor ordinarius at the University of Strasbourg (rector in 1878/79). A moderately liberal theologian, he became best known as a New Testament critic and exegete, being the author of "Die Synoptiker" (Commentary on the Synoptics; 1889; 3rd ed., 1901), the "Evangelium, Briefe und Offenbarung des Johannes" (Johannine books; 1890; 2nd ed., 1893), and the "Apostelgeschichte" (Acts of the Apostles; 3rd ed., 1901), in the series "Handkommentar zum Neuen Testament".

On the question of the relationship of the Synoptic Gospels, Holtzmann in his early work, "Die synoptischen Evangelien, ihr Ursprung und geschichtlicher Charakter" (The Synoptic Gospels: Their Origin and Historical Character), presents a view which has been widely accepted, maintaining the priority of Mark, deriving Matthew in its present form from Mark and from Matthew's earlier "collection of sayings", the Logia of Papias, and Luke from Matthew and Mark in the form in which we have them. This view was a modified version of Christian Weisse's hypothesis.

Other noteworthy works are:

- Lehrbuch der historisch-kritischen Einleitung in das Neue Testament (1885, 3rd ed., 1892).
- Lehrbuch der neutestamentlichen Theologie (2 volumes, 1896–97).
- Lexikon für Theologie und Kirchenwesen (1st ed.,1882; 2nd ed., 1888; 3rd ed., 1895); in collaboration with Richard Otto Zöpffel.

In 1893 he became editor of the "Theologischer Jahresbericht". Holtzmann died in Baden-Baden-Lichtental.

== Family ==
He married the daughter of Georg Weber. His daughter Adelheid (1866–1925) was a politician and women's rights activist. She married Gustav Steinmann.
