= Radachów =

- Village
- Location within Poland
- Coordinates: 52°29′51″N 14°55′6″E
- Country: Poland
- Voivodeship: Lubusz
- County: Słubice
- Gmina: Ośno Lubuskie
- Population: 500

Radachów [raˈdaxuf] is a village in the administrative district of Gmina Ośno Lubuskie, within Słubice County, Lubusz Voivodeship, in western Poland.

== Notable residents ==
- Anna Pappritz (1861–1939), German writer and suffragist
