= Deutscher Verband für Frauenstimmrecht =

The Deutscher Verband für Frauenstimmrecht (German Union for Women's Suffrage) was a German women's organization for women's suffrage, active between 1902 and 1919. It was founded by activist Martha Voß-Zietz. It was the first women's suffrage organisation in Germany and came to be one of the three most notable alongside Deutsche Vereinigung für Frauenstimmrecht (1911–1919) and Deutscher Frauenstimmrechtsbund (1913–1919). In 1916, it united with the Deutsche Vereinigung für Frauenstimmrecht and took the name Deutscher Reichsverband für Frauenstimmrecht. It was dissolved when women's suffrage was introduced in 1919.
