= GEDOK =

Voluntary association

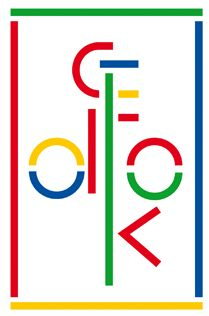
Official Logo Bundesverband GEDOK

The GEDOK, founded in 1926 as the "Gemeinschaft deutscher und oesterreichischer Künstlerinnen und Kunstfreundinnen" (Community of German and Austrian Women Artists and Art Friends), is the oldest and largest European network for female artists of all artistic genres."

== Organization and mission ==
GEDOK currently has more than 2,750 members in 23 regional groups in Germany. The national association and the regional groups present fine arts, applied arts/art design, literature, music and interdisciplinary/performing arts by female artists to the public. The non-profit association is committed to gender equality and participates in interdisciplinary art projects, exhibitions, concerts, readings, symposia, publications and catalogs. It supports artists morally and financially.

The work of female artists is promoted through the awarding of prizes and awards, distinctions, scholarships and competitions by the federal association and the regional groups. The following prizes are awarded for outstanding works: Ida-Dehmel Art Prize of the GEDOK and Gabriele Vossebein for Fine Arts, GEDOK FormART Elke and Klaus Oschmann Prize for Applied Arts, Ida-Dehmel Literature Prize and GEDOK Literature Promotion Prize. In the field of music, GEDOK e. V. promotes concerts and competitions.

GEDOK e. V. participates in the awarding of the Gabriele Münter Prize for Women Visual Artists and publishes catalogs, documentaries, anthologies and editions. The Federal Association is involved in national and international cultural institutions, political bodies and associations and is represented in the following national and international organizations, for example: International Society of Fine Arts, German Cultural Council, German Arts Council, German Literature Conference, German Music Council, Art Fund Foundation, German Women's Council.

GEDOK e. V. is represented in the Verwertungsgesellschaft Bild-Kunst and in the Federal Government's Art in Architecture selection committee. In the above-mentioned bodies, the federal association works on cultural policy in favor of the professional interests of women artists. Internally, GEDOK sees itself as a network and enables its female artists to engage in intensive exchange and collaboration - across disciplinary and regional boundaries.

== Foundation ==
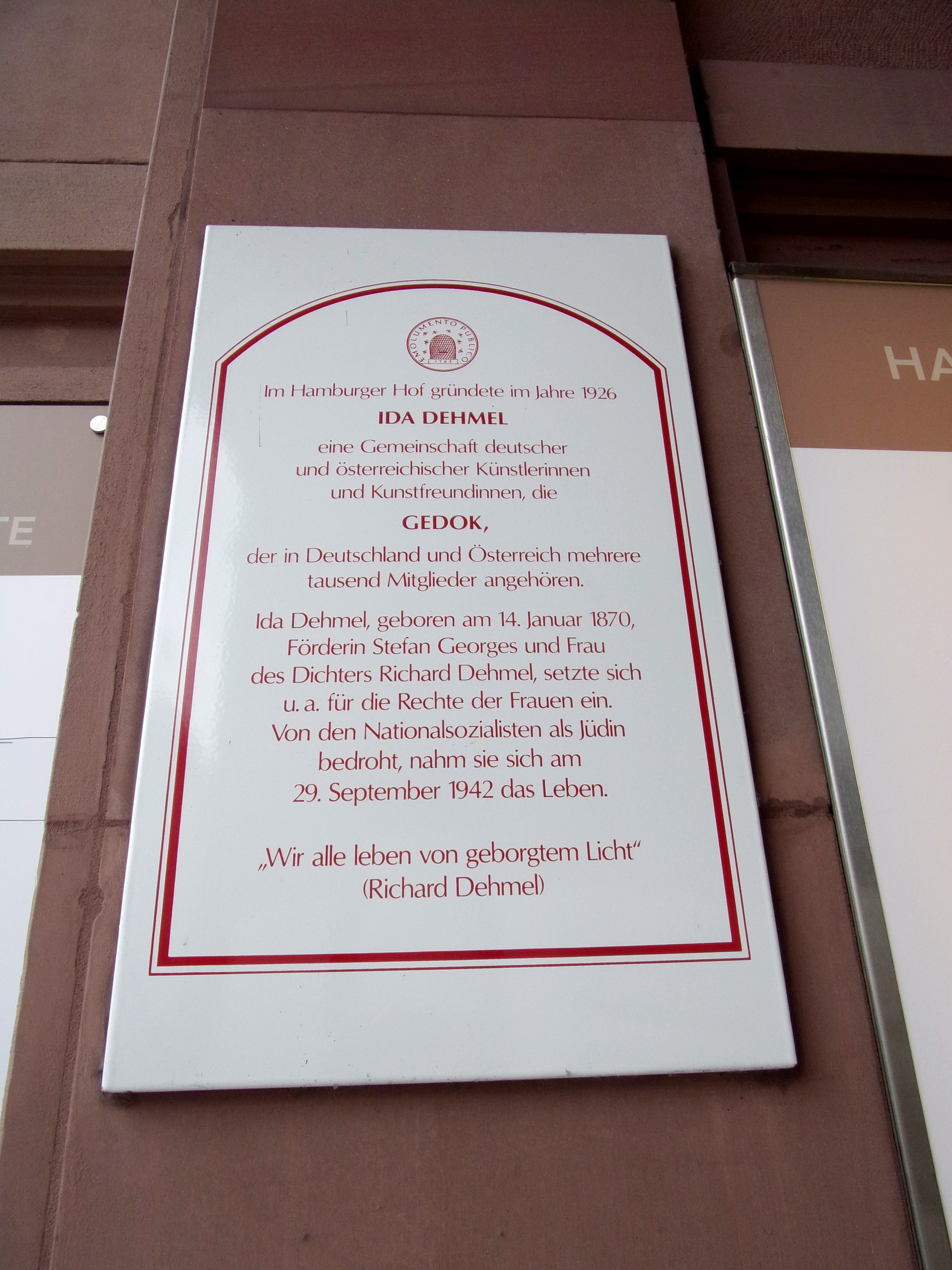
Tribute to Ida Dehmel at the Hamburger Hof building

The association was founded in Hamburg in 1926 by Ida Dehmel (1870–1942) as the "Gemeinschaft deutscher und oesterreichischer Künstlerinnen und Kunstfreundinnen". Ida Dehmel was a member of the Werkbund and on the board of the first Zonta Club. Dehmel promoted women artists by setting up a network of committed female patrons to support them. In 1927, GEDOK Niedersachsen-Hannover was founded in Hanover, followed by the founding of the Cologne group in 1929 under the chairmanship of Alice Neven DuMont, GEDOK Heidelberg under the chairmanship of Stephanie Pellissier and GEDOK Karlsruhe, GEDOK Leipzig in 1930 by Edith Mendelssohn Bartholdy and GEDOK Berlin in 1932.

== Nazi era ==
Shortly after the National Socialists came to power in 1933, Ida Dehmel was forced to resign from the board because of her Jewish heritage and she was ultimately expelled from GEDOK. Other Jewish members, such as Anita Ree, suffered the same fate. The persecution by the National Socialist regime drove Ree to commit suicide in 1933 and Dehmel in 1942. Elsa Bruckmann (a member of the NSDAP) was appointed as the new chairwoman and the women artists' association was renamed "ReichsGEDOK".

== Postwar ==
Shortly after the Second World War, the first GEDOK groups came together again: in Stuttgart in 1945, in Hanover, Mannheim and Hamburg in 1946, in Cologne in 1947 and in Heidelberg in 1948. In 1948, the federal association GEDOK was newly formed. The first constituent meeting took place in Anna Maria Darboven's house in Hamburg on the initiative of Marianne Gärtner, Ida Dehmel's niece. In 2010, the "Austrian Section" disbanded until further notice. In 1990, after reunification, further regional groups were founded in the new federal states, including GEDOK Brandenburg, GEDOK Central Germany in Leipzig and GEDOK Mecklenburg-Vorpommern, so that today the association with its 23 regional groups forms a functioning network.

== Board of Directors ==
The Federal Association GEDOK e.V. is based in Bonn (Haus der Kultur), where its office is also located. The narrower board within the overall board with representatives of the artists and art patrons consists of the president, the first deputy chairwoman, the second deputy chairwoman, the treasurer and the secretary. Ulrike Rosenbach served as President of GEDOK from 2012 to 2018. Her successor was Ursula Toyka-Fuong. Béatrice Porthoff was elected to this office in October 2022.

== Non-profit status and admission requirements ==
The association is recognized as a non-profit organization. The members work on a voluntary basis. The association obtains its financial resources from contributions and donations as well as project-related grants. A special feature is that not only artists from all sections, but also art-promoting members are accepted. Admission to the association is via the regional groups. For female artists, a university degree is desirable, but qualified self-taught artists can also apply. An expert jury in the regional groups decides on the admission of female artists.

== See also ==
- National Council of German Women's Organizations
- Bund Deutscher Frauenvereine
- League of Jewish Women (Germany)

== Literature ==
- Elke Lauterbach-Phillip: Die GEDOK (Gemeinschaft der Künstlerinnen und Kunstförderer e.V.). Ihre Geschichte unter besonderer Berücksichtigung der Bildenden und Angewandten Kunst. Utz, München 2005, ISBN 978-3-8316-0392-3.
