= Helene von Forster =

German woman activist

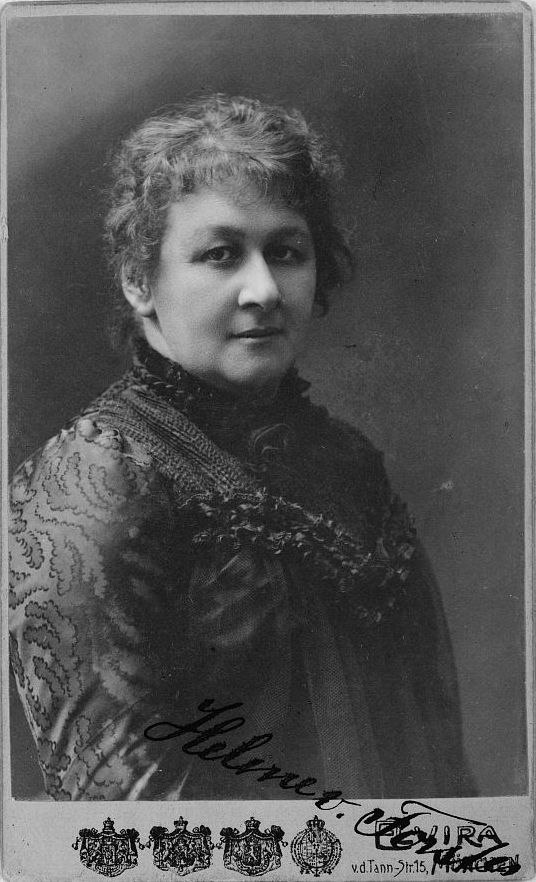
- Hofatelier Elvira, 1880
- Born: 27 August 1859; Nuremberg, Kingdom of Bavaria
- Died: 16 November 1923 (aged 64); Nuremberg, Germany
- Education: Portsche Institut zur Städtischen Höheren Mädchenschule
- Organization(s): Verein Frauenwohl; German Association of Female Citizens
- Political party: Progressive People's Party; German Democratic Party

Helene von Forster (born Helene Schmidmer, 27 August 1859 – 16 November 1923) was a German women's rights activist and author. She is considered the most important representative of the feminist movement's moderate "bourgeois" wing in Nuremberg.

== Life ==
Helene Schmidmer was born in Nuremberg, Kingdom of Bavaria, the eldest of her parents' four recorded children. Christian Schmidmer, her father, was a prominent member of the city's business community and the owner of a factory producing wires and cables. Her mother, born Nanette Lotz, was the daughter of a top civil servant from the nearby Duchy of Saxe-Coburg and Gotha. She attended the "Portsche Institut zur Städtischen Höheren Mädchenschule" (as it was known at that time), a prestigious school in the city's centre, and then, as was not unusual for daughters of the well-to-do at that time, concluded her formal education at a boarding school in Lausanne. From an early age she was exceptionally interested in literature.

On 20 September 1882 Helene Schmidmer married the leading Nuremberg eye doctor, Dr. Sigmund von Forster (1851–1939) whom she had met at literary events. They made their home in Nuremberg. She helped him with his work: her humour and warm heartedness were appreciated by patients. The couple's daughter was born in 1894.

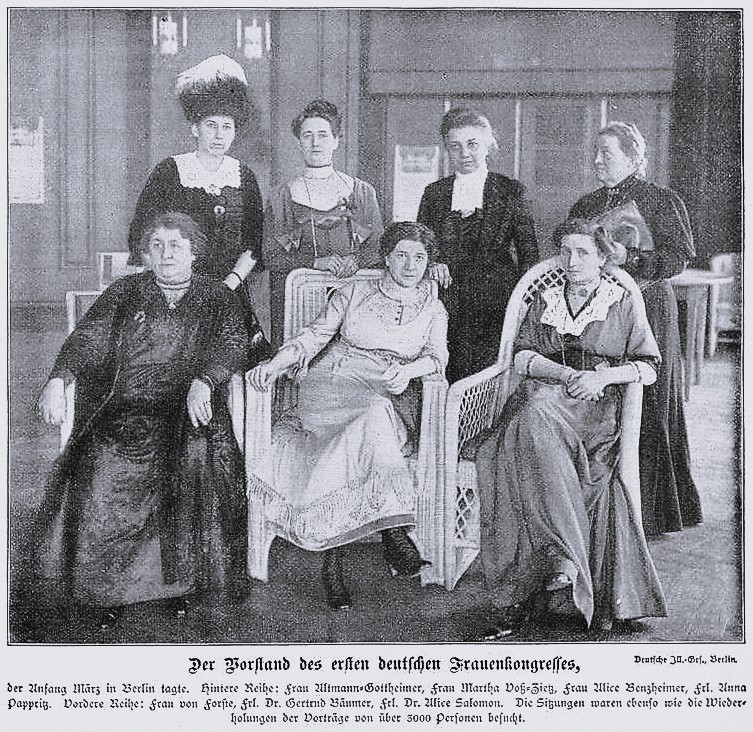
The Board of Directors of the German Women's Congress 1912 (German: Deutscher Frauenkongreß), including (back row from the left): Elisabeth Altmann-Gottheiner, Martha Voß-Zietz, Alice Bensheimer, Anna Pappritz, (front row from the left) Helene von Forster, Gertrud Bäumer and Alice Salomon

While still a young woman she began to write lyric poems, as well as more light-hearted poetry, volumes of which she published. She donated the proceeds to charitable causes. She contributed a short comedy to a celebration of the Pegnesischer Blumenorden (a misleadingly named Nuremberg literary society). Further stage pieces followed, such as "Das Burgweiblein" ("The Burgess") in 1902, "Im Hause Martin Behaims" in 1907 (which premiered, appropriately, on German Geography Day) and "Historie einer Urne" ("History of an Urn") in 1913, a "Festspiel" written to celebrate the 44th congress of the German Society of Anthropology, Ethnology and Early History.

Von Forster also deployed her literary talent and reputation in the service of the women's movement in which she engaged during or by 1893. That was when she teamed up with Bertha Kipfmüller and set up, formally on 16 November, the Nuremberg section of the Verein Frauenwohl ("Women's Welfare Association"), committed to improving conditions for women in the city and surrounding region. Helene von Forster became the association's the first chairwoman. Membership soon reached 2,000. The association organised evening classes covering matters such as home economics and budgeting, handicrafts and languages. They founded and ran the "New Nuremberg Women's Labour School" ("Neue Nürnberger Frauenarbeitsschule") and, from 1898, Bavaria's first post-natal women's hostel alongside the newly built city hospital in the St. Johannis quarter. This had what was seen as the important practical benefit of enabling working woman the chance to bring their babies into the world under medical supervision.

In 1894 she also organised a Nuremberg group of the Allgemeiner Deutscher Frauenverein literally, "General German Women's Association", a national umbrella organisation that had been in place since the 1860s, but which was undergoing major expansion nationally during the 1890s. She became a long-standing member of the regional executive. This organisation took an interest in various issues associated with the evolving women's movement, but its principal focus was on women's training and education. Van Forster became the first chairwoman of the Nuremberg group. In her committee work she was commended for her nimble use of words and also for the human intuition and warmth with which she guided the meetings she chaired. Meanwhile, her book Die Frau, die Gehilfin des Mannes, which had been published the previous year, was finding a growing resonance. Between 1895 and 1909 she founded or co-founded several further organisations with the purpose of improving the condition of women.

In 1908 the old (originally Prussian) ban on women's participation in politics, which for some years had been interpreted with varying levels of vigour in different parts of Germany, finally disappeared. Helene von Forster joined the "Fortschrittliche Volkspartei" (FVP / "Progressive People's Party"), remaining a member after 1918 when, following a party merger, the FVP became part of the new "Deutsche Demokratische Partei" (DDP / "German Democratic Party"). During the 1914/18 war she ran her organisation's own Red Cross hospital in Nuremberg. She also set up a women's education institution in the city. With many of the men away at war women were now expected to take a more prominent role in organising matters at home, and like many, by the end of the war she was convinced that women should be entitled to vote in national and local elections on the same basis as men. In the event, the new constitution introduced during the 1918/19 revolution, delivered equal voting rights for women (along with a number of other innovations which generated more discussion at the time), and in 1919 von Forster became a DDP city councillor. Membership of the city council in 1919 made her one of the first women in the new republican Germany to hold political office. Working with her party colleague and fellow councillor Agnes Gerlach she energetically promoted welfare measures, support for the blind, schooling for girls and women's health, along with measures in support of the arts and education more generally.

According to one source it was the level of energy that Helene von Forster applied to her role as a campaigning city councillor that hastened her death. She died in Nuremberg on 21 March 1923, predeceasing her husband and survived, also, by the couple's daughter.

== Published output (selection) ==
- Moment-Aufnahmen. J. L. Stich, Nürnberg 1892
- Im Freilicht. Nisters Kunstanstalt, Nürnberg 1893 (Gedichte)
- Die Frau, die Gehilfin des Mannes. Nürnberg 1893
- Nürnberg nach Aquarellen. W. Ritter mit Versen von Helene v. Forster. Ritter u. Klöden, 1896
- Das Burgweiblein. 1902 (Festspiel)
- Stimmungsbilder aus Nürnberg. Verlag Nister, Nürnberg 1906
- Im Hause des Martin Behaims. 1907 (Spiel)
- Familie und Persönlichkeits-Kultur. Vandenhoeck & Ruprecht, 1913
