= Anna Pappritz =

German writer and suffragist (1861–1939)

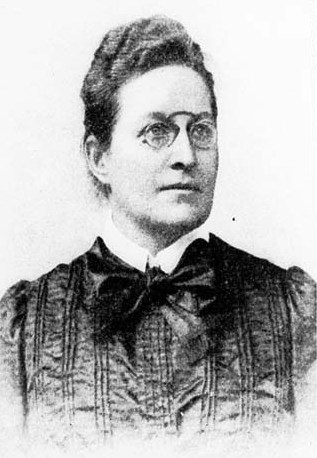
- Anna Pappritz at the International Women's Congress in Berlin (1904)
- Born: 9 May 1861; Radach, Drossen, Neumark, Kingdom of Prussia (Radachów, Poland)
- Died: 8 July 1939 (aged 78); Radach, Drossen, Neumark, Germany
- Occupations: Writer and suffragist
- Known for: Fight against prostitution

Anna Pappritz (9 May 1861 – 8 July 1939) was a German writer and suffragist. She was one of the leaders of the German branch of the International Abolitionist Federation, which sought to abolish regulations and criminal laws directed against prostitutes, and proposed instead to eliminate prostitution through moral education of young men and women, and through providing alternative ways by which young women could earn a living. Pappritz became one of the most prominent members of the women's movement in Germany.

== Early years ==
Anna Pappritz was born in Radach, Drossen, Neumark on 9 May 1861 to a Protestant family from Dresden. Her father was a landowner, and she grew up on the Radach estate at Drossen. She was the only girl in the family, but had three brothers who were educated at the Klosterschule in Rossleben and then went to university. Anna was given sufficient education at home by governesses and the local pastor for a future career as a wife and mother. As a girl she was interested in poetry. Her father died in 1877. At the age of nineteen she suffered serious injuries in a riding accident, and had to undergo surgery in a gynecological clinic in Berlin. She never fully recovered from the accident, and she was told she would have to live a quiet and secluded life.

In 1884 Pappritz and her mother moved to Berlin, where she took private lessons in philosophy, history and literature. In the 1890s she published several books of short stories and three novels. Her first work was a collection of short stories From the mountains of Tyrol (1893). She next published the novel Prejudices (1894), which dealt with the prejudices of her social class in their outlook on life and was based on her own experience. She was a student of Georg Simmel, and she and Simmel often contributed to the Freie Bühne theatrical review.

== Activist ==
A major turning point in Pappritz's life came in 1895 when she traveled to England for health reasons. There she learned of the existence of prostitution and its regulation by the state, and also of the women's movement. After her return to Berlin she became involved in the German women's movement, attended lectures of the Women's Welfare Association that Minna Cauer had established in 1888, and subscribed to Cauer's magazine Die Frauenbewegung (The Women's Movement). In 1898 Pappritz learned from an article by Cauer about the London-based International Abolitionist Federation (IAF). The IAF had been founded by Josephine Butler in England, who chose the term "abolitionism" to refer to freeing prostitutes from forced registration and testing for venereal diseases. (Note: It was no coincidence that with "abolition" Butler chose a term that had originally been applied to the campaign to give black slaves in America their freedom. Butler was also a leader of the campaign against "white slavery", the traffic of European women to serve as prostitutes in the Americas.) Pappritz immediately became involved in the campaign for abolition of regulation of prostitution.

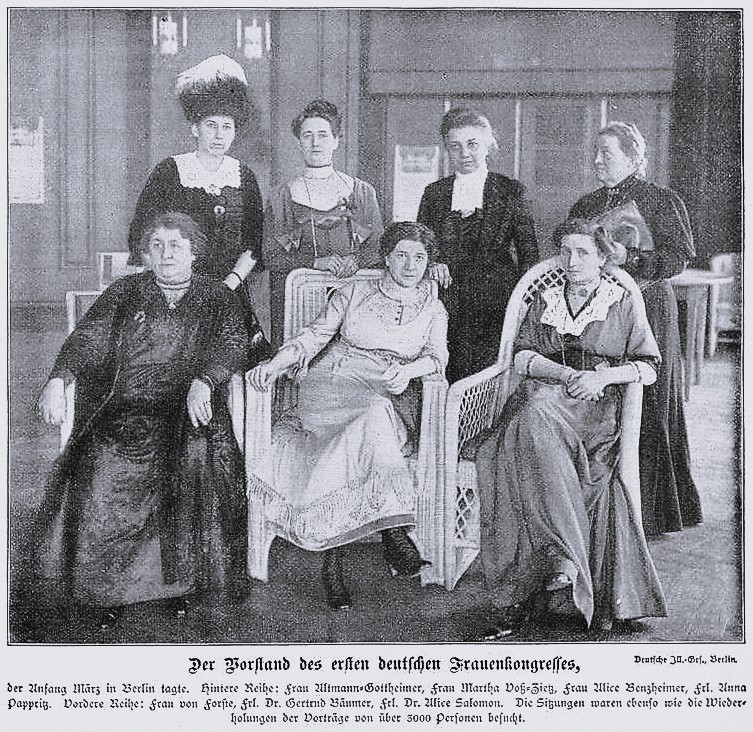
The Board of Directors of the German Women's Congress 1912 (German: Deutscher Frauenkongreß), including (back row from the left): Elisabeth Altmann-Gottheiner, Martha Voß-Zietz, Alice Bensheimer, Pappritz, (front row from the left) Helene von Forster, Gertrud Bäumer and Alice Salomon

In 1899 Pappritz met Butler in person at the International Women's Congress in London. That year she founded and became chairperson of the Berlin branch of the IAF. Anna Pappritz and Katharina Scheven became the two most influential leaders of the German branch of the IAF (Deutzcher Zweig IAF, DZIAF). From 1902 to 1914 Pappritz worked with Scheven as editor of the DZIAF magazine Der Abolitionist. After the 1905 the controversy about the New Ethic split the DZIAF. The moderates led by Scheven and Pappritz further consolidated their control. Some of the radicals turned to the cause of suffrage, and others to the sex-reform movement.

Pappritz joined the League of German Women's Associations (Bund Deutscher Frauenvereine: BDF) and was secretary from 1907 to 1914. She belonged to the board of directors of the German Society for Combating Venereal Diseases (DGBG) from 1902. Pappritz met with the Prussian minister of the interior in 1907, and as a result a circular was issued to the police to treat suspected prostitutes more leniently and to ensure that advice or free treatment of sexually transmitted diseases was available. However, the pre-war morality campaign was largely ineffective. Pappritz described a draft of a new criminal code published in 1909 as expressing "unconscious male sexual egotism" and said she feared "our 25 years of work has been for nothing." Fresh drafts were issued, but the project to revise the code was abandoned with the outbreak of World War I (1914–18).

In the fall of 1911 a new Prussian law on cremation was reported, which contained a provision that female corpses must be examined to determine if they were virgin. This caused outrage among the women of Berlin. Pappritz said the experts could not produce any valid reason for this violation of this most intimate and private aspect of a woman's life, at a time when the dead woman was helpless and had no way to defend her reputation. Pappritz organized an emergency IAF meeting to protest the law, which had a huge turnout and was followed by petitions. By early January 1912 the Prussian secretary of the interior had repealed the offending clause, but the effect of the scandal was to increase agitation for suffrage in the women's press.

Pappitz continued to play a central role in the movement for reform of prostitution during the Weimar Republic (1919–33). This culminated in the 1927 Law to Combat Venereal Disease, which abolished state regulation of prostitution. She remained head of the Berlin chapter of the IAF, later called the League for Protection of Women and Youth (Bund für Frauen- und Jugendschutz) until it was dissolved in 1933, despite suffering from ongoing health problems.

Anna Pappritz died in Radach on 8 July 1939 at the age of seventy-eight.

== Views ==
=== Social change ===
The BDF took the position that capitalist consumerism and advances in production techniques had removed the ability of middle-class women, particularly single women, to contribute to the economy of the home. Pappritz wrote, "the living conditions of the female youth have changed enormously in the last fifty years. In earlier times, the largest majority of girls out of school stayed as daughters of the house in the protection of their parents' house, where they found occupation as helpers to their mothers until they created their own household by marriage... Now many of those chores ... have moved into the factories, and thus the female youth are pushed from the protection of the parents' house into independent employment.

=== Prostitution ===
There was fierce debate among feminists in Germany about how to handle prostitution, seen as the source of venereal diseases and thus a major health problem. Helene Stöcker (1869–1943) thought sexual freedom for women would remove demand. Hanna Bieber-Böhm (1851–1910) favored stronger legal action by the state against the clients of prostitutes. Pappritz thought the solution was moral education of young people and encouragement of abstinence outside marriage. Pappritz felt concern for the prostitute as an exploited woman, but despised prostitution as an institution. She had no sympathy for registered prostitutes who considered themselves to be workers providing a useful service.

In a 1903 article in the BDF journal Pappritz argued that regulation of prostitution meant the state was declaring that some people were a target for other people's diversion. They were second-class beings, or slaves. Pappritz said that regulators were "only motivated by the desire to secure 'healthy goods' for the young men of their own circles, for propertied, educated men." In 1907 Pappritz published a collection of case studies of women in the sex trade, with commentary, in which she concluded that the idea of "born whores" was completely wrong, and in almost all cases women were driven to prostitution by economic necessity. She portrayed the vice squad as serving the interests of male clients, while punishing prostitutes but making no effort to help them.

In 1909 Pappritz and Scheven issued a pamphlet giving the DZIAF position on criminal law reform. They wrote that, "prostitution is primarily called forth by demand from the side of men, and that it is often social distress that forces women to meet this demand with the corresponding supply." The solution, which was at odds with the leaders of the men's morality movement, was legislation that protected women workers and "organization of women workers, in order to secure for them a living wage, and better access for women to education and vocational training." They stated that regulation of prostitution was an unjustified restriction of civil liberty, and was unjust in affecting only the woman and not her client. Criminalization would also be unjust in punishing only the woman, and letting the man go free. The state should be involved in cases such as coercion, abuse of minors, procuring and aggressive soliciting, but otherwise sex was a private matter and state interference would be an outrageous violation of individual freedom.

Concerned about the spread of venereal disease, during World War I the military organized its own brothels with "safe and clean" women, and cracked down on illegal prostitution. Even Pappritz agreed that the growing numbers of informal prostitutes were a grave threat to the welfare of soldiers, and therefore to the nation.

=== Other views ===
Abstinence was a key part of the abolitionist belief. At the DGBG conference in 1903 Pappritz described at length expert medical opinion that there were no physical or psychological risks to those who abstained from sexual activity. Pappritz was in favor of education for youth of both sexes, teaching abstinence until marriage. She proposed special homes or programs for vulnerable young women to provide a moral education and train them for work in domestic service, religious work or the textile industry. She said, "Every girl longs one day to find the man with whom she can devote her love and trust, who will become her refuge and support for life. Her own household, husband and children are not only the goal of each girl's desires, but they are also her natural life's work." However, "not every girl's fate turns in such a way that it leads to a happy marriage."

Pappritz supported eugenics. In 1906 she said that "those with hereditary diseases (above all venereal diseases) [should] voluntarily renounce having progeny. She wrote in 1913, "raising a healthy, numerous, mentally and morally fit progeny can only be achieved through the work of intellectually and morally mature, physically healthy mothers conscious of their responsibility." She thought that creating such women was "the foremost goal of the women's movement." At the time, contraception was thought by most Christians to be deeply immoral. The abolitionists were ambivalent. In 1906 Pappritz supported "regulation" of births so a mother could space them out by at least two years, but in 1911 an article in the Abolitionist criticized contraception as egotistical, weakening the nation demographically and therefore militarily.

Pappritz wanted a ban on "all places of entertainment that are nothing more than veiled brothels." This included indecent displays and performances with no artistic value. In 1908 the Abolitionist ran a denunciation by a Protestant pastor of "immoral literature". However, Pappritz strongly opposed efforts by morality campaigners to tighten up censorship legislation, saying they wanted to censor everything that was politically or religiously liberal. She thought the drive for censorship revealed "inner unchasteness" that made them "suspect every form of nudity and naturalness of being indecent." Pappritz, Helene Lange (1848–1930) and Gertrud Bäumer (1873–1954) vigorously opposed Stöcker and the "New Ethic" of sexual morality and sexual freedom for women outside of marriage. She worked hard to exclude Stöcker's League for the Protection of Mothers from the feminist mainstream, saying it added nothing new either in theory of practice.

Pappritz considered homosexuality "reprehensible, repulsive and disgusting", but also believed that "private relationships between adults are not subject to the criminal law." The BDF passed a resolution saying "sexual aberrations without injury to legal rights of third persons must remain unpunished." Pappritz opposed the extension of laws on homosexuality, which was illegal between men, to also include women. Although she denounced the depravity of lust, she pointed out that penetration was not possible between women. This was in line with conventional ideas of the time about the sexual innocence of women. She was more concerned with the greater ills of child abuse, pimping, seduction and the egotistic demands of husbands. However, she made it clear that "the sin, when practiced by women, is just as reprehensible, unpleasant, and revolting as when it is committed by men."

== Publications ==
Pappritz wrote a number of short stories or novels in the 1890s.

- Aus d. Bergen Tirols (From the mountains of Tyrol) 1893
- Vorurteile (Prejudices), 1894
- Die Wahrheit (The Truth), 1897
- Freundschaft zw. Mann u. Weib (Friendship between Man and Woman), 1898
- Ein Enterbter (A Disinherited), 1899

After becoming involved in the morality movement Pappritz wrote numerous articles and pamphlets, and several books. These include:

- Die Teilnahme d. Frauen an d. Sittlichkeitsbewegung (participation of women in the morality movement), in: Hdb. d. Frauenbewegung, hg. v. H. Lange u. G. Bäumer, 1901–06
- Die gesundheitl. Gefahren d. Prostitution (Dangers of Prostitution), 1903
- Die Welt, von der man nicht spricht! (The World of Which One Dares Not Speak!), 1907
- Die Wohnungsfrage (The Housing Question), 1908
- Die Frau im öff. Leben (Women in Public Life), 1909
- Die positiven Aufgaben u. strafrechtl. Forderungen d. Föderation, 1909
- Umgestaltung d. Frauenbildung durch d. Dienstpflicht, in: Die weibl. Dienstpflicht, hg. v. Inst. f. soz. Arbeit, 1916
- Einf. in d. Studium d. Prostitutionsfrage (Introduction to the Study of Prostitution), 1919
- Der Mädchenhandel u. seine Bekämpfung (The Girl Trade and the Fight Against It), 1924

== Sources ==
- Dickinson, Edward Ross (2014-02-17). Sex, Freedom, and Power in Imperial Germany, 1880–1914. Cambridge University Press. ISBN 978-1-107-04071-7.
- Dollard, Catherine Leota (2009). The Surplus Woman: Unmarried in Imperial Germany, 1871–1918. Berghahn Books. ISBN 978-1-84545-480-7.
- Lybeck, Marti M. (2014-07-09). Desiring Emancipation: New Women and Homosexuality in Germany, 1890–1933. SUNY Press. ISBN 978-1-4384-5221-0.
- Matysik, Tracie (2008). Reforming the Moral Subject: Ethics and Sexuality in Central Europe, 1890–1930. Cornell University Press. p. 166. ISBN 978-0-8014-4712-9.
- Pappritz, Anna (1984). "Wie ich zu meiner Arbeit kam (How I came to my work)". In Peters, Dietlinde (ed.). Bürgerlichen Frauenbild des Kaiserreichs. (unpublished manuscript from 1908). Bielefeld.
- Pataky, Sophie (1898). "Pappritz, Frl. Anna.". Lexikon deutscher Frauen der Feder. Vol. 2. Berlin: Carl Pataky.
- Reinert, Kirsten (2001). "Pappritz, Anna". Neue Deutsche Biographie. Vol. 20.
- Rosenblum, Warren (2008). Beyond the Prison Gates: Punishment and Welfare in Germany, 1850–1933. Univ of North Carolina Press. ISBN 978-0-8078-3204-2.
- Smith, Jill Suzanne (2014-02-28). Berlin Coquette: Prostitution and the New German Woman, 1890–1933. Cornell University Press. ISBN 978-0-8014-6970-1.
- Stratigakos, Despina (2008). A Women's Berlin: Building the Modern City. U of Minnesota Press. ISBN 978-0-8166-5322-5.
