= Adelheid Steinmann =

German politician (1866–1925)

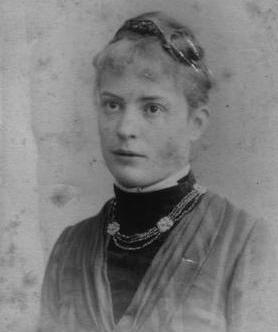
Adelheid Steinmann (1900)

Adelheid Steinmann (born Adelheid Holtzmann; 26 April 1866 in Heidelberg – 20 January 1925 in Bonn) was a German politician, women's rights activist and wife of Gustav Steinmann.

== Life ==
=== Family ===
Adelheid Holtzmann was born on 26 April 1866 in Heidelberg to Protestant theologian Heinrich Julius Holtzmann and his wife Karoline Weber, daughter of the historian Georg Weber. Her brothers included the historian Robert Holtzmann and the hygienist Friedrich Holtzmann. In 1886, she married the geologist Gustav Steinmann. The couple had a son. One of her grandsons is Wulf Steinmann (born 1930), former member of the European Academy of Sciences and Arts and president of LMU Munich (1982–1994).

=== Work ===
Steinmann successfully fought for the female education at German universities. Baden became the first country in the German Empire where women had been enrolled for the winter semester 1899/1900 at the University of Freiburg. Until then, women in Germany were only allowed to study with a special permit, or they had to be admitted as a guest. The special permit was only given to women who studied under the "supervision" by a husband. When Prussia admitted general women's studies in 1908, 190 female students were already studying in Freiburg. Steinmann became chairwoman of the Verein Frauenbildung-Frauenstudium from 1900 to 1914.

After 1908, her work shifted increasingly into the political sphere, the goal being the women's suffrage. Since 1912, she worked with Julie Bassermann (1860–1940) in the Reichsfrauenausschuss of the National Liberal Party (Nationalliberale Partei). In 1918, Steinmann co-founded the left-wing German Democratic Party (DDP) and became vice-president. The first presidency was reserved for a man, Friedrich Naumann.

Adelheid Steinmann ran for the Reichstag in 1919, but she transferred her secure place on the list to the younger Marie Elisabeth Lüders (1878–1966). In Bonn, Steinmann had been one of the first female members of the city council.

== Select publications ==
- Die höhere Mädchenbildung, Vorträge gehalten auf dem Kongreß zu Kassel. Leipzig/Berlin 1908.
- Die Forderung politischer Neutralität im Frauenstimmrecht. In: Die Frau, vol. 17 (1909/1910), pp. 641–648.
- Frauenbewegung und Parteipolitik. In: Die Frau, vol. 19 (1911/12), pp. 481–486.
- Zwei Frauenurteile über Mann, Frau und Familie. In: Die Frau, vol. 20 (1912/1913), pp. 153–159.
- Wieder einmal das Oberlyceum und seine Freunde. In: Die Frau, vol. 21 (1913/1914), pp. 370–374.
- Die Frau in der Familie. In: Jahrbuch des Bundes Deutscher Frauenvereine. 1918, pp. 31–49.

== Sources ==
- Jan Merk: Adelheid Steinmann. In: Badische Biographien. N.F. 4. 1996, pp. 285–287.
- Ernst Th. Nauck: Das Frauenstudium an der Universität Freiburg im Breisgau Freiburg 1953.
- Lexikon der Frau. Vol. 2, Zürich 1954, S. 1345.
- Grete Borgmann: Freiburg und die Frauenbewegung. Ettenheim 1973, pp. 8–46.
- Barbara Greven-Aschoff: Die bürgerliche Frauenbewegung in Deutschland 1894–1933. Göttingen 1981, p. 119, 146, 163, 287.
- Helmut Stubbe da Luz: Adelheid Steinmann. In: Das Rathaus Jg. 39 (1986), pp. 527–531.
- Eva Steffens: Historische Skizze. In: Frauenhandbuch. Freiburg 1992, pp. 188–198.
- Rudolf H. Böttcher: 100 Jahre Frauenstudium, Adelheid Steinmann. (mit Ahnentafel u. Bild), In: Pfälzisch-Rheinische Familienkunde. Vol. 14 (1999), p. 467.
- Obituaries in:
  - Bonner Zeitung 23. Januar 1925, Generalanzeiger 24. Januar 1925
  - Martha Dönhoff: Adelheid Steinmann. In: Die Frau. Vol. 32 (1924/1925), pp. 183–184.
