= Georg Weber =

German historian (1808–1888)

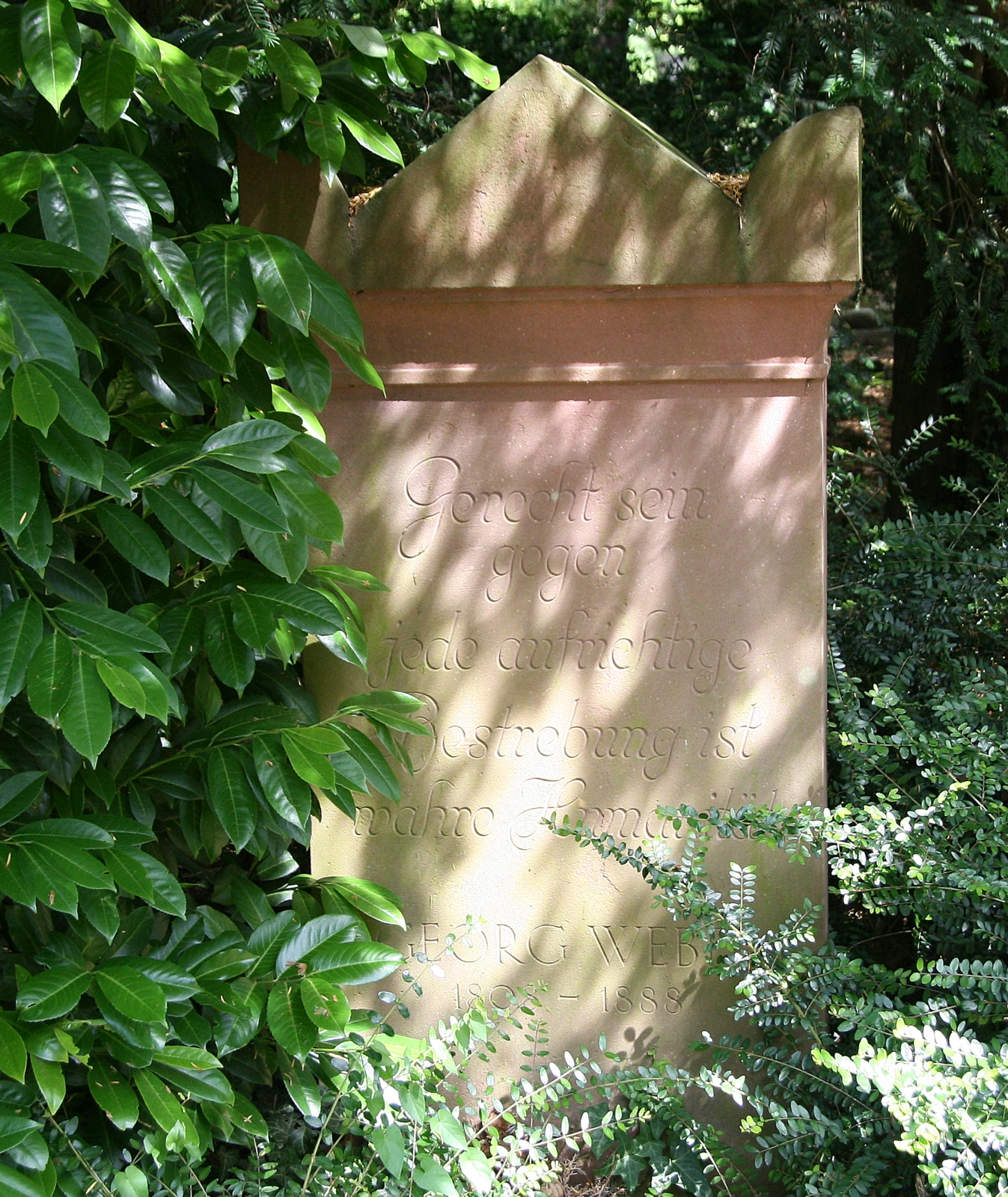
Weber's grave in Heidelberg

Georg Weber (10 February 1808 in Bad Bergzabern – 10 August 1888 in Heidelberg) was a German historian.

He studied at Erlangen. In 1839, he became a teacher at the upper Bürgerschule in Heidelberg, and from 1848 to 1872 was its director.

Among Weber's historical publications may be mentioned:

- Geschichtliche Darstellung des Calvinismus im Verhältniss zum Staat in Genf und Frankreich bis zur Aufhebung des Edikts von Nantes, 1836 – Historical background of Calvinism in relationship to the state in Geneva and France up until the repeal of the Edict of Nantes.
- Weltgeschichte in übersichtlicher Darstellung – later translated into English and published as Outlines of universal history from the creation of the world to the present time (1851).
- Geschichte des Volkes Israel und der Entstehung des Christenthums (History of the people of Israel and the emergence of Christianity, with Heinrich Julius Holtzmann, 1867).
- Allgemeine Weltgeschichte (Basic world history; 15 volumes, 2nd edition 1882–89).
- Geschichte der deutschen Literatur von ihren Anfängen bis zur Gegenwart (History of German literature from its beginnings to the present; 11th edition, 1880).
