= Stoatley Rough School =

School in Surrey, England

Coordinates: 51.1058°N 0.7228°W

Stoatley Rough School was a school founded in 1934 by Dr Hilde Lion in Haslemere in England. It was for Jewish children who were refugees from Germany, helping them acclimatise to British education. Bertha Bracey – an organiser of the Quaker Germany Emergency Committee – found a donor for the school building, chaired the board of governors from 1938 to 1945 and continued as a governor of the school until 1960 when the school closed. Dr. Emmy Wolff taught German literature and became second in command at the school in 1937.
