= Andreas Lixl =

Andreas Lixl (September 11, 1951 – December 24, 2015), also known as Andreas Lixl-Purcell, was Professor Emeritus of German Studies at The University of North Carolina at Greensboro, where he taught German language, literature, and European cultural history.

He grew up in Salzburg, Austria. From the University of Vienna he transferred to the University of Wisconsin-Madison where he received a Ph.D. in German Literature and Culture in 1984. His publications include books on Weimar Theater, German-Jewish autobiographies, women's memoirs, and college German textbooks. His research focused on migrant literature, European culture, and foreign language teaching technologies.

Lixl died from cancer on December 24, 2015, at the age of 64.

== Book publications ==
- Memories of Carolinian Immigrants: Autobiographies, Diaries, and Letters from Colonial Times to the Present. Lanham 2009. ISBN 0761844147.
- Women of Exile: German-Jewish Autobiographies since 1933. Westport 1988.ISBN 0313259216.
- Stimmen eines Jahrhunderts 1888-1990: Deutsche Autobiographien, Tagebücher, Bilder und Briefe. Fort Worth, 1991. ISBN 0030491827.
- Rückblick: Texte und Bilder nach 1945. Boston, 1994. ISBN 0395699045.
- Erinnerungen deutsch jüdischer Frauen 1900–1990. Leipzig 1992. ISBN 3-379-01423-0.
- Ernst Toller und die Weimarer Republik 1918–1933. Heidelberg 1986. ISBN 353303853X.

== Sources ==
- WorldCat book catalog http://www.worldcat.org/
- Women of Exile. http://www.worldcat.org/oclc/16717764
- Memories of Carolinian Immigrants. http://www.worldcat.org/oclc/277275488
