= Adolf Holtzmann =

German professor and philologist

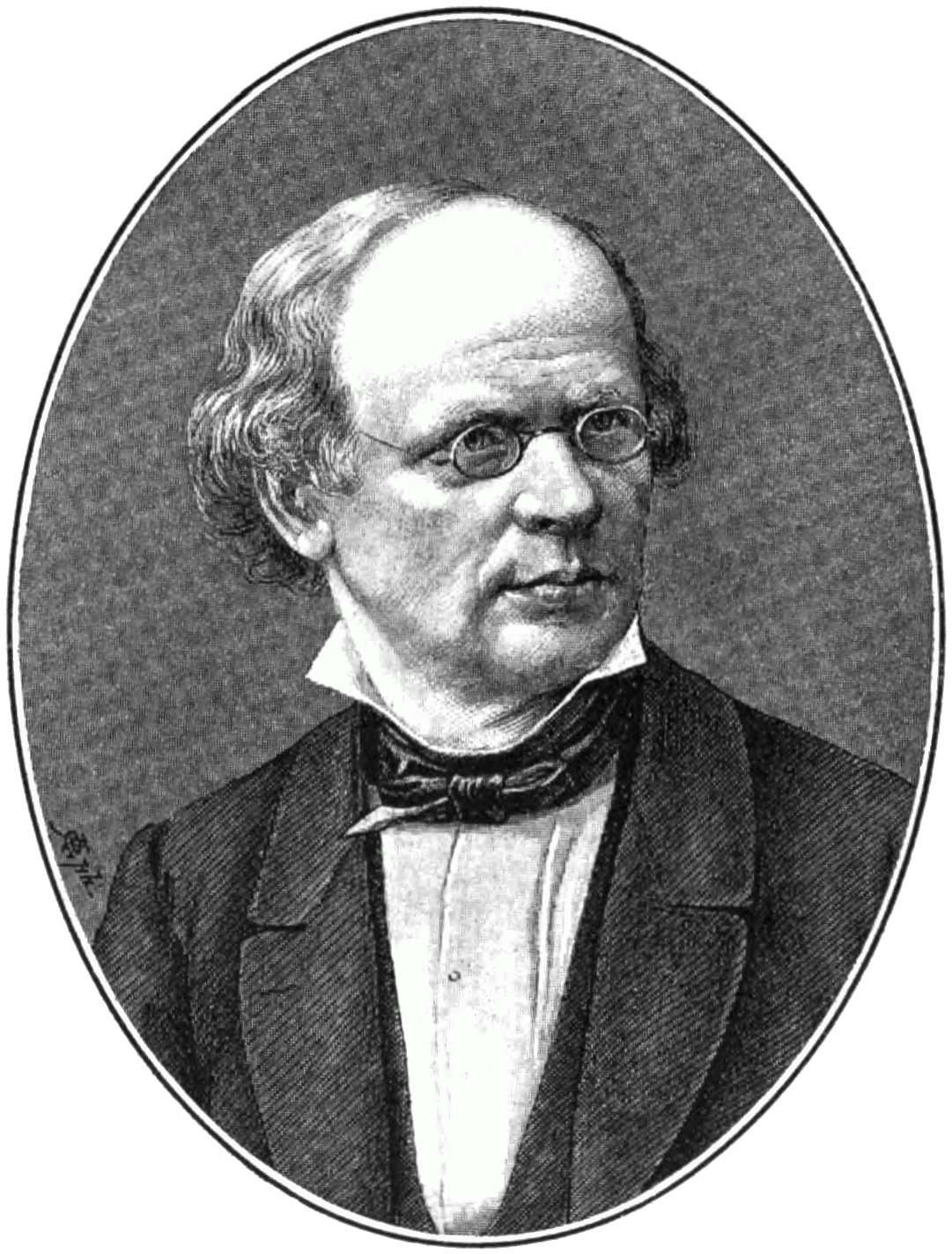
- Adolf Holtzmann
- Born: 2 May 1810; Karlsruhe
- Died: 3 July 1870 (aged 60); Heidelberg
- Education: University of Halle
- Alma mater: Friedrich Wilhelm University of Berlin
- Known for: Holtzmann's law
- Spouse: Luise
- Scientific career
- Fields: Philology
- Institutions: Heidelberg University
- Academic advisors: Friedrich Schleiermacher

Adolf Holtzmann (2 May 1810 in Karlsruhe – 3 July 1870 in Heidelberg) was a German professor and philologist. His name is associated with a Proto-Germanic sound law known as Holtzmann's law.

He studied theology at the University of Halle and the Friedrich Wilhelm University of Berlin, where he was a student of Friedrich Schleiermacher. He later studied philology at the Ludwig-Maximilians-Universität München, where his influences included Johann Andreas Schmeller. Holtzmann also attended classes at the University of Paris given by Eugène Burnouf, and beginning in 1837, spent a number of years working as a tutor to members of Baden royalty. From 1852, he was a professor of German literature and Sanskrit at Heidelberg University, and a notable philologist of his day.

Holtzmann was the father-in-law of Albrecht Kossel, German biochemist and 1910 Nobel laureate, by his marriage to Holtzmann's daughter, Luise, in 1886.

== Selected works ==
- Ueber den griechischen Ursprung des indischen Thierkreises, 1841 – On the Greek origin of the Indian zodiac.
- Über den Umlaut. Zwei Abhandlungen, 1843 – On umlaut: two treatises.
- Über den Ablaut, 1844 – On ablaut.
- Beiträge zur Erklärung der persischen Keilinschriften, 1845 – Contributions to the explanation of Persian cuneiform inscriptions.
- Indische Sagen, 1st part 1845 and 3rd part 1847 (2nd ed. in two volumes 1854) – Indian legends.
- Untersuchungen über das Nibelungenlied, 1854 – Investigations of the "Nibelungenlied".
- Kelten und Germanen. Eine historische Untersuchung, 1855 – Celts and Germans, a historical study.
- Der große Wolfdieterich, 1865 – Wolfdietrich.
- Altdeutsche Grammatik, umfassend die gotische, altnordische, altsächsische Sprache, 1870-75 (with Alfred Holder) – Old Germanic grammar; spanning Gothic, Old Norse and Old Saxon.
- Germanische Alterthümer. Mit Text, Übersetzung und Erklärung von Tacitus Germania, 1873 – Germanic antiquities with text, translation and explanation of Tacitus' "Germania".
- Deutsche Mythologie, 1874 (edited by Alfred Holder; published posthumously) – German mythology.

== See also ==
- Holtzmann's law
