= Carl Heath =

Carl Heath (1869–1950) was a leader of the Quaker movement in Britain and a penal reformer. He was the secretary of the National Peace Council during the First World War when he conceived the idea of Quaker embassies to establish an international Quaker organisation. He was a member of the Humanitarian League and secretary of the Society for the Abolition of Capital Punishment.
