= Martha Voß-Zietz =

German conservative and women's rights activist (1871–1961)

- Born: 23 July 1871; Hamburg, German Empire
- Died: 8 December 1961 (aged 90); Bad Schwartau, Germany
- Organization(s): Women's Welfare Association; German Union for Women's Suffrage
- Political party: German Fatherland Party; German Nationalist Protection and Defiance Federation
- Spouse: Friedrich Voß

Martha Pauline Catharina Voß-Zietz (23 July 1871 – 8 December 1961) was a German conservative, women's rights activist, suffragist, nationalist and writer. She founded the German Union for Women's Suffrage, co-founded and was the chairwoman of the Association of German Housewives' Associations and joined the German Fatherland Party.

== Biography ==
Voß-Zietz was born in 1871 in Hamburg, German Empire, and had family roots in Eutin. While visiting family in Eutin, she met Friedrich Voß and they married.

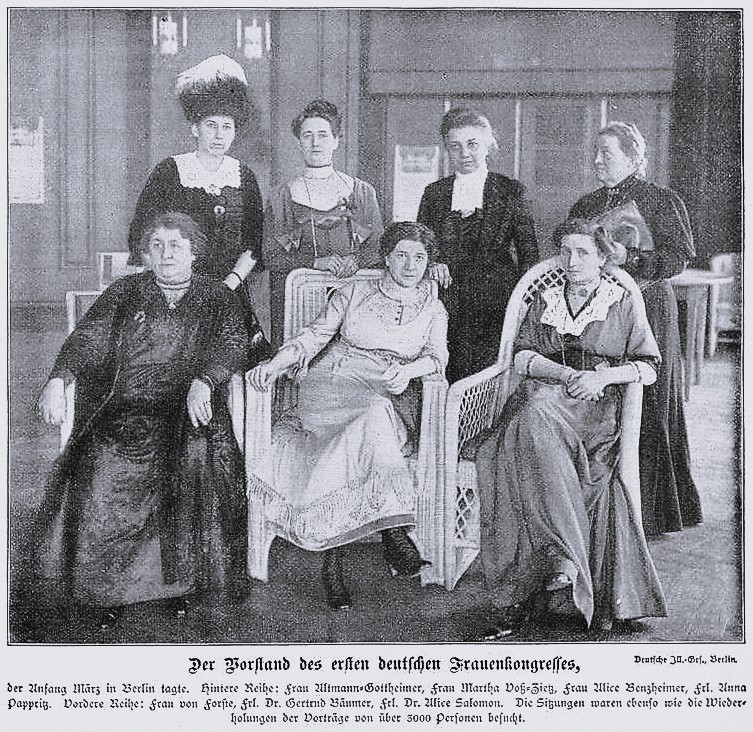
The Board of Directors of the German Women's Congress 1912 (German: Deutscher Frauenkongreß), including (back row from the left): Elisabeth Altmann-Gottheiner, Voß-Zietz, Alice Bensheimer, Anna Pappritz, (front row from the left) Helene von Forster, Gertrud Bäumer and Alice Salomon

In 1899, Voß-Zietz founded the liberal Women's Welfare Association (German: Verein Frauenwohl). In 1902, she founded the German Union for Women's Suffrage (German: Deutscher Verband für Frauenstimmrecht). She gave lectures on women's suffrage in Eutin.

In 1912, Voß-Zietz was a board member of the German Women's Congress (German: Deutscher Frauenkongreß) in Berlin. In 1915, Voß-Zietz was co-founder and the chairwoman of the Association of German Housewives' Associations (German: Reichsverband deutscher Hausfrauenvereine) [de], known as the Reich Association of German Housewives' Associations (RDH) from 1924.

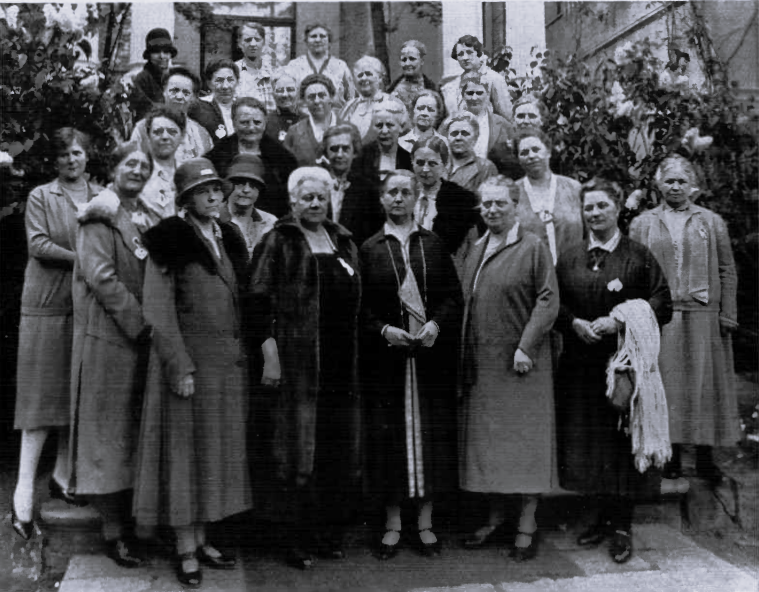
Board and members of the Reich Association of German Housewives, including Voß-Zietz

During World War I, Voß-Zietz worked as a consultant for the War Food Office, under the auspices of the Prussian War Ministry. She published articles with advice for housewives so that they could cope with wartime economic changes. She gave talks on wartime nutrition and budgeting.

Voß-Zietz joined the German Fatherland Party (German: Deutsche Vaterlandspartei, DVLP), founded in 1917. She was critical of the women's committee of the German National People's Party (German: Deutschnationale Volkspartei, DNVP).

After the German defeat in World War I, Voß-Zietz wrote articles for the newspapers Der Tag and Deutsche Zeitung, covering topics such as loyalty to the fatherland, preserving the concept of "German honour" and demanding the return for the territories of Danzig (now known as Gdańsk) and Upper Silesia to Germany. She encouraged women to read about how the ancient Teutons had pushed their exhausted menfolk back towards their enemies.

By 1922, Voß-Zietz had beco me more politically right-wing and was known for being antisemitic. She joined the newly founded German Nationalist Protection and Defiance Federation (German: Deutschvölkischer Schutz- und Trutzbund, DVSTB).

In the 1920s, Voß-Zietz praised Benito Mussolini, the totalitarian dictator of Fascist Italy from 1922, for his work to restrict the import of foreign foods, writing "how can a responsible citizen not wish for a man like Mussolini, who ends with a strike of the pen the import of bananas and teaches Germans to eat German apples?"

Voß-Zietz died on 8 December 1961 in Bad Schwartau, Germany, and was buried in Eutin.
