= Frieda Duensing =

German lawyer and school director

Frieda Johanna Duensing (26 June 1864, Diepholz — 5 January 1921, Munich) was a German lawyer and director of the Social Women's School in Munich. She was a pioneer of social work and one of the first doctoral students in Germany in 1922. She started her social work after she was in Hanover women's poorhouse in 1882, there she found dreadful conditions of women living with their children in one room. To study degree in law, Frieda left Hanover. She was a leader in Juvenile Court work and was among the first advocates to write about child abuse.
