= Holtzmann's law =

Proto-Germanic sound law

Holtzmann's law, also known as Verschärfung (lit. 'sharpening'), is a sound law that describes the evolution of the Proto-Germanic geminate glides *-ww- and *-jj- into the North Germanic and East Germanic languages. It was first noted by German philologist Adolf Holtzmann in 1838. The geminate glide *-jj- became *-ggj- in North Germanic and *-ddj- in East Germanic, while *-ww- evolved into *-ggw- in both branches.

== Description and occurrences ==
The law involves the gemination, or doubling, of PIE semivowels (glides) *-y- and *-w- in strong prosodic positions into Proto-Germanic *-jj- and *-ww-, which had two outcomes:

- hardening into occlusive onsets:
  - *-ggj-/*-ggw- in North Germanic;
  - *-ddj-/*-ggw- in East Germanic
- vocalization of the first semivowel, its addition to a diphthong, and division of the diphthong and remaining semivowel into two separate segments in West Germanic.

The process is brought about by the fact that vowels (or semivowels) in the syllable margin are invariably transformed into consonantal articulations.

The conditions of the sound change were long debated, since there was a seemingly random distribution of affected and unaffected words. At first, dependence on word accent was assumed, parallel to Verner's Law. One solution, first proposed by Smith (1941), postulates dependency on the presence of a PIE laryngeal, which when lost, triggered lengthening as if the semivowels were vowels, and forced them into the syllable margin.

According to Lehmann (1955), the lengthening occurs in the contexts of PIE *-VwH-, *-iyH-, *-ayH-, *-aHy- (where V is any short vowel, and H is any laryngeal).

For example, PIE *drewh₂yo → early Proto-Germanic *trewwjaz 'trustworthy, faithful' →:

- *triwwjaz: Old Norse tryggr, Gothic triggws
- *triuwjaz: Old English trēowe, Old High German gitriuwi.

One instance where a laryngeal was never present is PIE *h₂ōwyóm 'egg', but after the loss of *-w-, the *-y- shifted into the syllable margin, giving:

- with hardening:
  - *ajjis: Crimean Gothic ada (pl.) (*addi (sg.) < *ajjis)
  - *ajją: Old Norse egg
- with diphthongization:
  - *aijaz: (Note: The plurals OHG eigir and OE ǣgru exhibit an s-stem.) German Ei, Old English ǣġ

== Alternative views ==
Some linguists (e.g. Joseph Voyles) hold that Holtzmann's Law represents two separate and independent sound changes, one applying to Gothic and another to Old Norse, rather than being a common innovation. This is supported by James W. Marchand's observation that a Runic inscription (niuwila on the Naesbjaerg bracteate of the 5th century) and an early loan into Finnic (*kuva 'picture', cf. Gothic skuggwa 'mirror', Old High German skūwo 'look') do not exhibit this change. If true, this would prevent Holtzmann's law from being used as an example of early Gotho-Nordic unity, in which context it is often cited. Voyles's explanations of the changes do not involve laryngeal theory.

== Similar developments in later Nordic languages ==
Faroese shows a similar development, where some Old Norse long vowels developed into diphthongs, which then hardened into stops, e.g. Old Norse þrír → Faroese tríggir, ON róa → Far. rógva. This phenomenon is commonly called Faroese Verschärfung or by the Faroese term skerping ('sharpening'), which, however, also refers to the fronting of vowels that subsequently takes place in these contexts. Another similar change occurs in a number of Jutlandic dialects of Danish, where high vowels carrying the stød prosody develop diphthongal glides which are then "hardened" into stops or fricatives, a phenomenon commonly called "klusilspring" ("stop shifting") or "klusilparasit" ("stop parasite").

== See also ==
- Glossary of sound laws in the Indo-European languages
- Grimm's law
- Northwest Germanic
