= Gustav Steinmann =

German geologist and paleontologist

- Born: 9 April 1856; Braunschweig, Duchy of Brunswick
- Died: 7 October 1929 (aged 73); Bonn, Germany
- Citizenship: Germany
- Education: Ludwig-Maximilians-Universität München
- Known for: Steinmann trinity, chronology of the Andean orogeny
- Spouse: Adelheid Holtzmann (1866–1925)
- Children: 1 son Gustav
- Scientific career
- Fields: Geology, paleontology
- Workplaces: University of Strasbourg; University of Jena; University of Freiburg; University of Bonn

Johann Heinrich Conrad Gottfried Gustav Steinmann (9 April 1856 – 7 October 1929) was a German geologist and paleontologist. He performed various studies in the Ural Mountains, North America, South America, the Caucasus and the Alps. Steinmann had a large number of scientific publications. He made contributions to the Theory of Evolution and to the study of the structural geology and orogeny of the Andes.

In the Alps and Apennines Steinmann defined what later became known as the "Steinmann Trinity," the occurrence of serpentine, pillow lava, and chert. The recognition of Steinmann's Trinity served years later to build up the theory around seafloor spreading and plate tectonics. Steinmann himself interpreted ophiolites (the Trinity) using the geosyncline concept. His studies of ophiolites in the Apennines paved the way for the discovery of allochthonous nappes in the Alps and Apennines.

== South America ==
Steinmann redefined the Navidad Formation in 1895, then called Piso Navidad, described by Charles Darwin by giving it a Lower Tertiary age and spanning much of south-central Chile. In 1934 Juan Brüggen separated Piso Concepción from Steinmann's Piso Navidad after showing there was a discordance between them.

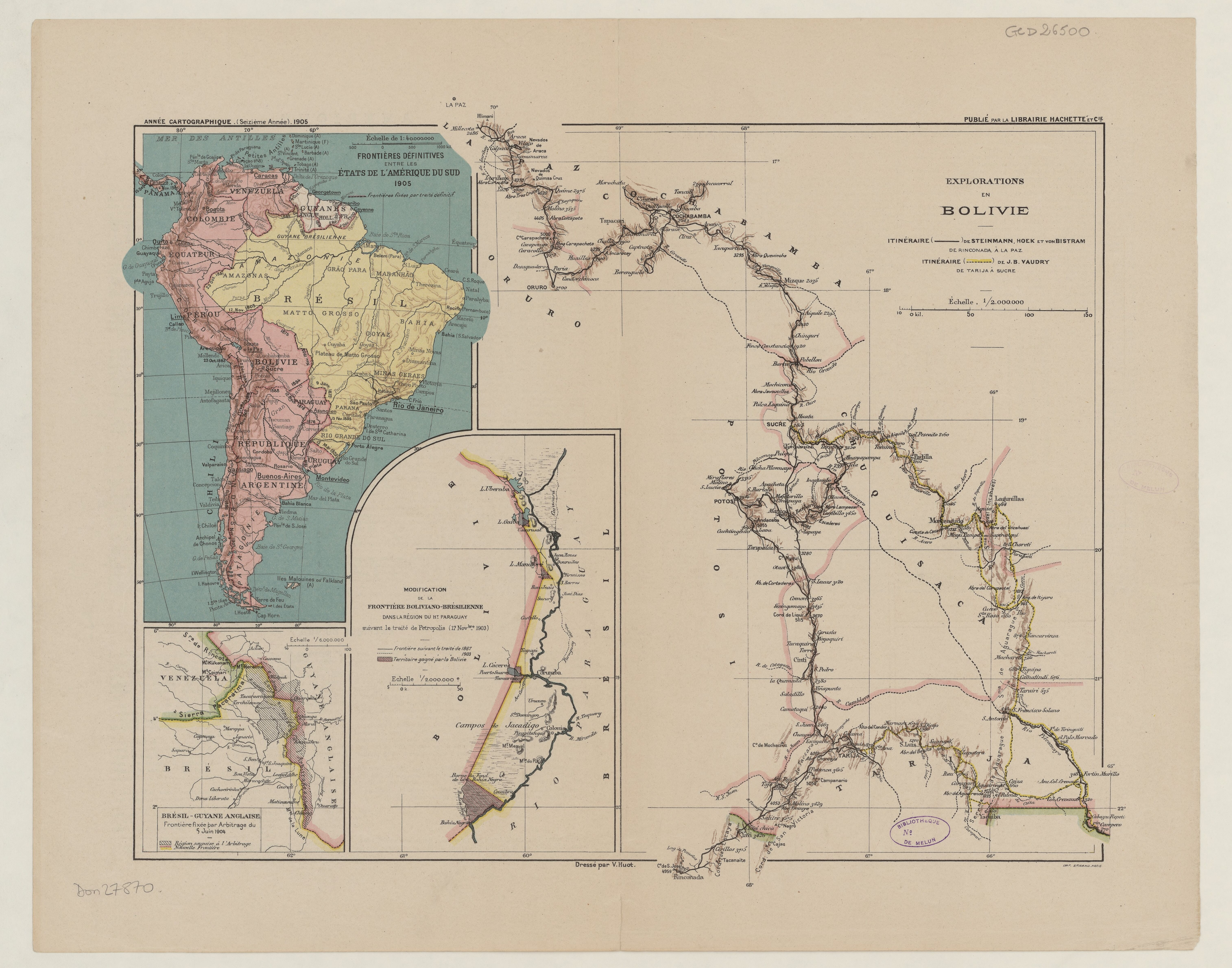
Explorations in Bolivia map of Gustav Steinmann, H. Hoek and Von Bistram expedition

In Peru Steinmann studied the geology of Cerro de Pasco and of the Marañón fold and thrust belt among other things. In a work published posthumously by his students in 1929 Steinmann defined the main phases of the Andean orogeny in Peru. He theorized that the apparent lack of ophiolites in the Peruvian Andes within geosyncline theory; it was either indebted to the Andes being preceded by a shallow geosyncline or the Andes representing just the margin of a geosyncline.
