= Alice Bensheimer =

German women's right activist (1864–1935)

- Born: Elise Rosa Coblenz; 6 May 1864; Bingen, Germany
- Died: 20 March 1935 (aged 70); Mannheim, Germany
- Occupations: Women's rights activist, Secretary to the Federation of German Women's Associations
- Political party: Progressive People's Party (until 1918); German Democratic Party (from 1918)
- Spouse: Julius Bensheimer (m. 1885)
- Children: Ernst Bensheimer
- Parent: Simon Zacharias Coblenz
- Relatives: Ida Dehmel (sister)

Alice Bensheimer (born Alice Coblenz: 6 May 1864 – 20 March 1935) was a German women's rights activist and longstanding secretary to the Federation of German Women's Associations ("Bund Deutscher Frauenvereine" / BDF).

== Life ==
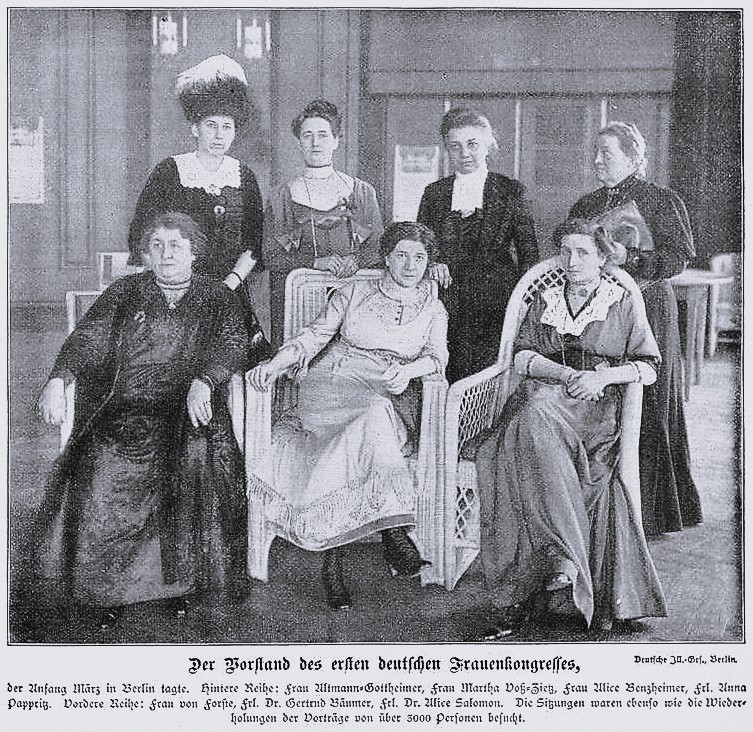
The Board of Directors of the German Women's Congress 1912 (German: Deutscher Frauenkongreß), including (back row from the left): Elisabeth Altmann-Gottheiner, Martha Voß-Zietz, Bensheimer, Anna Pappritz, (front row from the left) Helene von Forster, Gertrud Bäumer and Alice Salomon

Elise Rosa ('Alice') Coblenz was born in Bingen, along the left (here south) bank of the Rhine, into a prosperous well established Jewish family. There were five children. Emilie, (Note: Emilie Coblenz: born Emilie Meyer: 1840 - 1878, a daughter of Joseph Philipp Meyer 1799 – 1874) their mother died while they were still small. Simon Zacharias Coblenz (1835 – 1910), their father, was a wine grower/trader and leading member of the local business community who inflicted a strict rule based upbringing on his motherless children. Jewish religious holidays and precepts were to be unquestioningly respected. Details of her education are not known, but it is likely that she would have received the type of privately provided semi-education considered appropriate for girls of that time. In 1885 she married the Mannheim publisher Julius Bensheimer (1850 – 1917) who was fourteen years her senior.

It appears that just as soon as her two children were old enough to be left unattended for more than a couple of hours she turned her attention to social and public work with a particular focus on feminist politics and on poverty relief. Initially she was principally active in Mannheim, but after the nineteenth century gave way to the twentieth century she was increasingly involved in the BDF at a national level. She became a member of the Progressive People's Party ("Fortschrittliche Volkspartei" / DVP) and, following the political realignments of 1918, of the German Democratic Party ("Deutsche Demokratische Partei" / DDP).

Following the National Socialist take-over at the start of 1933, little more is heard of Alice Bensheimer. (She and her family were Jewish.) Her late husband's publishing business was "aryanized" and then, a couple of years later, subsumed into the Weidmannsche Buchhandlung books business.

Bensheimer herself died in 1935 and was therefore spared the race-based persecution meted out to members of Mannheim's Jewish mercantile community who had previously been particularly well integrated into the city's middle-class.

== Family ==
Julius Bensheimer, Alice's husband, was a well-known local politician in Mannheim and a publisher who produced, among other publications, the left-liberal Neue Badische Landeszeitung (regional newspaper). Ernst Bensheimer, the couple's son, qualified as a lawyer but died young in 1923. One of her younger sisters was the poet Ida Dehmel.

== Works ==
In 1896 Bensheimer set up the "Caritas" women's organisation which undertook social work in the local Jewish communities, providing support for widows and orphans and creating otherwise unavailable education opportunities to the latter. "Caritas" was administered and organised as a partner organisation of the "August-Lamey-Loge", a charitable institution set up by her husband at around the same time. It is likely that in 1897 Bensheimer was a founder member of the Mannheim "Vereinsabteilung des Vereins Frauenbildung – Frauenstudium", concerned with education for girls and established that year by her friend and fellow feminist activist Julie Bassermann. The national umbrella association was particularly active across southern Germany at this time, supporting the opening of new secondary schools and university level institutions for girls.

Bensheimer's social and political interests had broadened by 1899 when she became a member of the municipal office of the Poverty and Youth Commission, working for poverty relief. In 1904 or 1905 she moved from the municipal to the national scene when she was appointed to the office of secretary with the executive of the BDF. She remained in the post till 1931, while at the same time working as editor for the BDF newsletter.

Despite her national role in the BDF, she continued to be active in poverty relief in Mannheim, retaining membership of various welfare related local organisations and initiatives, and as a member of the Baden Women's Association ("Badischer Frauenverein"). During the First World War, which erupted at the end of July 1914, she took over leadership of the previously prosperous city's "Centre for War Welfare" ("Zentrale für Kriegsfürsorge"). After the war and the ensuing revolutionary events that followed, in 1922 she founded and thereafter, through the so-called "Weimar years" till 1933, headed up the "Mannheimer Notgesellschaft". This was a drawing together of associations committed to public welfare and poverty relief in a city where as a consequence of the disastrous war unsupported widows and orphans were now commonplace. She also sustained her support for various other local projects: she was involved in 1916 with the foundation by the Mannheim "Verein Frauenbildung – Frauenstudium" in 1916 of the "Social Women's School for the Training of Care givers and Related Female Professions" (Soziale Frauenschule also known sometimes simply as the "Welfare School / "Wohlfahrtsschule"), one of the first institutions of its kind in the German empire. Elisabeth Altmann-Gottheiner, herself a teacher, who taught at the city's Commercial Academy, was installed as executive-chair of the administrative board at the new school, while Marie Bernays was appointed to the headship.

Within and on behalf of the women's movement Alice Bensheimer became an intensive networker, happy to work together with government agencies through the Baden Women's Association ("Badischer Frauenverein") or indeed with the social-democratic women's movement at a time when, for a wife and daughter of the Mannheim middle-class establishment, Clara Zetkin and the other Social-democratic feminists would conventionally have been considered far outside the political mainstream. Bensheimer was convinced that the shared interests of women were far above and outside the world of mere party politics, and she called for greater female involvement in social issues and in schools policy. That was the context in which she was also an early advocate of women's suffrage.
