= Gertrud Bäumer =

German politician (1873–1954)

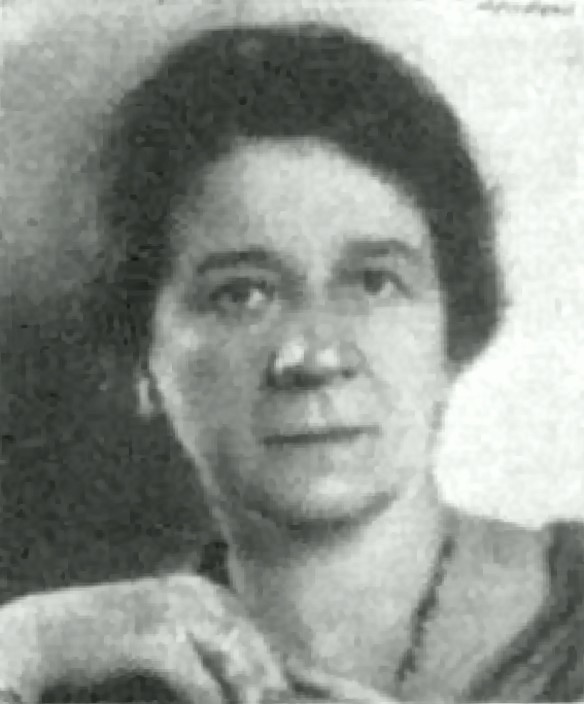
- Born: 12 September 1873; Hagen-Hohenlimburg, Westphalia
- Died: 25 March 1954 (aged 80); Gadderbaum, Bielefeld district
- Education: Humboldt University of Berlin
- Employer: Federal Ministry of the Interior
- Organization(s): General German Women Teacher's Association; Federation of German Women's Associations; Nationaler Frauendienst
- Political party: German Democratic Party; German State Party
- Parent(s): Eduard Bäumer, Anna Bäumer

Gertrud Bäumer (12 September 1873 – 25 March 1954) was a German politician who actively participated in the German civil rights feminist movement. She was chairwoman of the Federation of German Women's Associations (BDF) from 1910 to 1919, a member of the Reichstag from 1919 to 1932, and in 1920 became the first woman in Germany to be appointed Ministerialrat (a senior civil servant) in the Reich Federal Ministry of the Interior. She was also a writer, and contributed to Friedrich Naumann's paper Die Hilfe. From 1898, Bäumer lived and worked together with the German feminist and politician Helene Lange.

== Life ==
=== Childhood and Education ===
Gertrud Bäumer was born in Hagen-Hohenlimburg, Westphalia, to a Reformed Protestant family and moved to Cammin, a former episcopal town in Pomerania at the age of three. Her father, Eduard Bäumer, served as a Protestant pastor. Her great-grandfather, Wilhelm Bäumer, was also a pastor in Bodelschwingh near Dortmund where he served as a church politician. He supported the continuation of the presbyterian-synodal constitution established in the Prussian province of Westphalia in 1815, and later in other parts of Prussia. After her father’s early death, ten year old Gertrud moved with her mother and her two siblings to her grandmother's house in Halle (saale). Her mother, Anna Bäumer, raised Gertrud and her siblings while encouraging her education and intellectual development despite limited financial means. Bäumer wrote about the emptiness in her mother's life and her economic dependency on relatives in her memoirs as a sad, but educational experience. Concerning the emptiness at her grandmother's house, she writes: "Was this what women's life was like—this spiral around one's own axis?" According to her own account, her desire to pursue a career was determined early on: "I wanted to—and for economic reasons had to—become a teacher."

She attended the Higher Girls' School in Halle and subsequently completed her teacher training at the Magdeburg Teachers' Seminary. She taught at elementary schools in Halberstadt, Kamen, and Magdenburg starting in 1894. Soon after, she became involved with the General German Women Teacher's Association (ADLV, German: Allgemeiner Deutscher Lehrerinnenverein), whose head, Helene Lange, left a significant mark on her both professionally and personally.

Gertrud Bäumer studied in Berlin at the Humboldt University of Berlin and received her Ph.D. in 1905. This was an impressive accomplishment for women at that time in Imperial Germany. There she studied philology, German studies, theology and economics. Adolf von Harnack, a church historian, and Wilhelm Dilthey, a philosopher, were two influential academic lecturers while she studied at the Humboldt University of Berlin. Her dissertation was on Goethe's Satyron. Bäumer edited the Handbuch der Frauenbewegung [Handbook of the Women's Movement] from 1901–1906. From 1916–1920 she was in charge of the Social Pedagogical Institute with Marie Braun.

Bäumer was a member in close contact with the board of the national umbrella group of German women's organizations, the Bund Deutscher Frauenvereine (Federation of German Women's Associations) and during World War I she helped found the Nationaler Frauendienst (NFD, National Women's Service). As such, Bäumer was aggressively opposed to the feminist-pacifist women supporting internationalism in Germany and elsewhere; stating: "We mustn't ever forget that it is not just military training that is being put to the test out there in the trenches and at sea, at the gun emplacements and in the air, but also German mothers' upbringing and German wives' care."

=== Political life ===
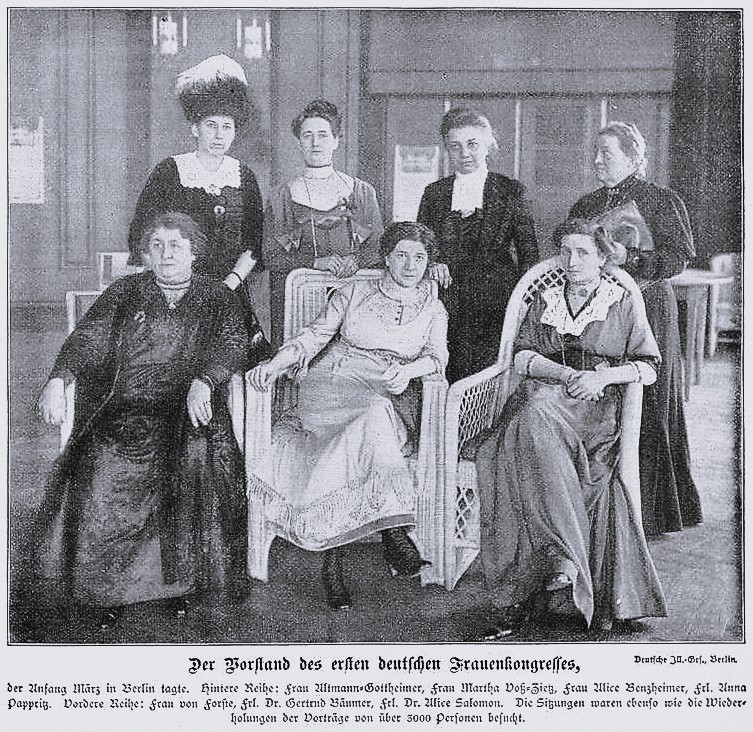
The Board of Directors of the German Women's Congress 1912 (German: Deutscher Frauenkongreß), including (back row from the left): Elisabeth Altmann-Gottheiner, Martha Voß-Zietz, Alice Bensheimer, Anna Pappritz, (front row from the left) Helene von Forster, Bäumer and Alice Salomon

Bäumer was associated with difference feminism, a school of thought emphasizing distinct contributions of women to society, often described in contemporary sources as a "feminine principle" aimed at the humanization of life. Politically, she aligned with the social liberal ideas of Friedrich Naumann and other members of the German liberal movement, with whom she began collaborating in 1906. From 1912, she oversaw the cultural section of Naumann’s journal Die Hilfe and, following his death in 1919, briefly served as its sole editor. Sources also describe her as maintaining both a professional and personal friendship with Naumann.

After the 1908 amendment to Prussian association law allowed women to join political parties, Bäumer and Helene Lange became members of the Free-minded Association, which later evolved into the Progressive People’s Party (FVP). In 1919, Bäumer helped to found the German Democratic Party (DDP and served as its deputy chairwoman between 1920 and 1930.

In 1919, she was elected to the Weimar National Assembly and held a seat in the Reichstag from 1920 to 1932, serving from 1930 to 1932 as a member of the German State Party (DStP), of which the German Democratic Party had recently merged. Together with her fellow party member Theodor Heuss, she championed the 1926 Law for the Protection of Youth from Obscene and Immoral Publications. This met with considerable criticism from artists, writers, and the left-liberal press, who feared censorship. Writers such as Kurt Tucholsky mocked Bäumer referring to her as, "Old Bäumerhand, the terror of democracy" mocking her supposed defence of democracy as hypocritical for support the perceived censorship of arts and media. She did not run for re-election to the Reichstag in 1932 due to this backlash and waning relevancy of the German State Party after its declining voter base, along with failure to secure alliances with the SPD, Centre, and DVP.

Furthermore, in 1920 she was appointed Ministerial Councilor in the Reich Ministry of the Interior, where she was responsible for the departments of youth welfare and education. From 1926 to 1933, she also served as the Reich government's delegate to the League of Nations in Geneva .

Before 1933, Gertrud Bäumer used Die Hilfe to comment on the rise of National Socialism, which she viewed with deep skepticism. When rumors of a Beer Hall Putsch spread in 1923, she condemned events in Bavaria as “a ruthless struggle for power…for whom the Reich is only worth something insofar as they rule it,” fueled by a gullible bourgeoisie. After the failed Putsch, she lamented that nationalist agitation had even weakened republican parties, noting that Germany’s economic elites were “at best, republicans in principle.”

As Nazi popularity grew, Bäumer warned that their victory “would be the collapse of Germany,” criticizing Adolf Hitler’s Mein Kampf as a “surprisingly confused book.” She acknowledged that National Socialism attracted supporters not only through manipulation but by addressing real ideological and psychological needs, yet she condemned its antisemitism, demagogy, and falsification of facts as she described it "National Socialism, whatever valuable aspects it may have, is more destructive than constructive as long as its leaders act irresponsibly." She hoped instead for a renewed democratic center grounded in “civil liberties in the spirit of the Reich Constitution.”

=== Helene Lange and her work for the women's movement ===
In Berlin, Gertrud Bäumer became closer to Helene Lange, the head of the teacher's movement. Bäumer learnt from an acquaintance shortly after her arrival in 1898 that Lange's work was being progressively impeded by an eye problem, and she volunteered her skills as an assistant. Largely due to Lange's efforts, Bäumer contributed to the women's movement through her work with the BDF (Association of German Women's Organizations) and the monthly journal Die Frau (The Woman) which aimed to appeal to the broad mass of middle-class women. She replaced Marie Stritt as chairperson in 1910, serving until 1919 and being the association's unchallenged most powerful figure even after that.

== Published works ==
Gertrud Bäumer's published works as cited by An Encyclopedia of Continental Women Writers.

Novels and short stories:

- Sontag mit Silvia Monika [A Sunday with Silvia Monika], 1933.
- Adelheid, Mutter der Königreiche [Adelheid, Mother of Kingdoms], 1936.
- Der Park [The Park], 1937.
- Der Berg des Königs [The King's Mountain], 1938.
- Das königliche Haupt [The Royal Head], 1951.

Autobiography:

- Lebensweg durch eine Zeitenwende [A Life's Path Crossing The Threshold to a New Age], 1933; reprinted under the titled Im Licht der Erinnerungen [In the Light of Memories] in 1953.

Essays, studies and letters:

- Die Frau in der Kulturbewegung der Gegenwart [The Woman in the Cultural Movement of the Present Times], 1904.
- Goethes Satyron [Goethe's Satyron], 1905.
- Die Frauenbewegung und die Zukunft unserer Kultur [The Women's Movement and the Future of our Culture], 1909.
- Die soziale Idee in den Weltanschauungen des 19. Jahrhunderts [The Social Idea in the Ideologies of the 19th Century], 1910.
- Die Frau und das geistige Leben [Woman and the Intellectual Life], 1911.
- Der Wandel des Frauenideals in der modernen Kultur [The Change of the Ideal of Women in Our Modern Culture], 1911.
- Von der Kinderseele [On the Souls of Children], 1912.
- Ida Freudenberg, 1912.
- Was sind Wir unserem geistigen Ich schuldig? [What Do We Owe Our Intellectual Self?], 1912.
- Entwicklung und Stand des Frauenstudiums und der höheren Frauenberufe [Development and Present Situation of Studies for Women and of Advanced Jobs for Women], 1912.
- Die Frau in Volkswirtschaft und Staatsleben der Gegenwart [The Woman in Economy and Public Life in the Present Time], 1914.
- Der Krieg und die Frau [War and Women], 1914.
- Die Lehren des Weltkriegs für die deutsche Pädagogik [Consequences of WW 1 for German Pedagogy], 1915.
- Weit hinter den Schützengräben [Far Behind the Trenches], 1916.
- Zwischen Gräbern und Sternen [Between Tombs and Starts], 1919.
- Helene Lange, 1918.
- Studien über Frauen [Studies on Women], 1920.
- Fichte und sein Werk [Fichte and His Work], 1921.
- Das Reichsgesetz für Jugendwohlfahrt [The Imperial Law for Youth Welfare], 1923.
- Die seelische Krise [The Crisis of the Soul], 1924.
- Die Frau in der Krise der Kultur [The Woman in the Crisis of Our Culture], 1926.
- Europäische Kulturpolitik [European Cultural Politics], 1926.
- Deutsche Schulpolitik [German School Politics], 1928.
- Grundlagen demokratischer Politik [Foundation of Democratic politics], 1928.
- Grundsätzliches und Tatsächliches zur Bevölkerungsentwicklung [Fundamental Aspects and Facts of the Development of the Population], 1929.
- Nationale und Internationale Erziehung in der Schule [National and International Education in School], 1929.
- Die Frauengestalten der deutschen Frühe [Women Figures in the German Past], 1929.
- Neuer Humanismus [New Humanism], 1930.
- Schulaufbau, Berufsauslese, Berechtigungswesen [Reconstruction of the School, Selection of Jobs, Justification], 1930.
- Heimatchronik während des Weltkriegs [Home Chronicle During the Time of WW1], 1930.
- Sinn und Formen geistiger Fûhrung [Meaning and Forms of Intellectual Leadership], 1930.
- die Frau im neuen Lebensraum [The Woman in New living Space], 1931.
- Goethe-überzeitlich [Goethe-From a Transcendental Viewpoint], 1932.
- Krisis des Frauenstudiums [Crisis of Women Studies], 1932.
- Die Frau im deutschen Staat [The Woman in the German Nation], 1932.
- Familienpolitik [Family Politics], 1933.
- Der freiwillige Arbeitsdienst der Frau [The Voluntary Work Service of the Woman], 1933.
- Männer und Frauen im geistigen Werden des deutschen Volkes [Men and Women in the Intellectual Development of the German People], 1934,
- Ich kreise um Gott [I Am Circling Around God], 1935.
- Wolfram von Eschenbach, 1938.
- Krone und Kreuz [Crown and Cross], 1938.
- Gestalt und Wandel [Form and Change], 1939.
- Frauen der Tat [Women in Action], 1959.
- Das Antlitz der Mutter [My Mother's Face], 1941.
- Der ritterliche Mensch [The Chivalric Person], 1941.
- Die Macht der Liebe [Love's Power], 1942.
- Der neue Weg der deutschen Frau [The New Way for the German Woman], 1946.
- Die Reichsidee bei den Ottonen [The Imperial Idea under the Ottonians], 1946.
- Das hohe Mittelalter als christliche Schöpfung [The High Middle Ages as a Christian Creation], 1946.
- Eine Woch im Mai [A Week in May], 1947.
- Der Jüngling im Sternenmantel [The Youth in the Coat of Stars], 1947.
- Der Dichter Fritz Usinger [The Poet Fritz Usinger], 1947.
- Die christliche Barmherzigkeit als geschichtliche Macht [Christian Mercy as Historical Power], 1948.
- Ricarda Huch, 1949.
- Die drei göttlichen Komödien des Abendlandes [The Three European Divine Comedies, a study on Dante's Divina Commedia, Wolfram von Eschenbach's Parzival and Goethe's Faust], 1949.
- Frau Rath Goethe, 1949.

Editions:

- Der Traum vom Reich [The Dream about the Empire], 1955.
- Goethe's Freundinnnen [Goethe's Girl Friends], 1909.
- Die Religion und die Frau [Religion and the Woman], 1911.
- Der deutsche Frauenkongreß Berlin [The German Women Congress in Berlin], 1912.
- Die Deutsche Frau in der sozialen Kriegsfürsorge [The German Woman in the Veterans' Welfare System], 1916.
- Eine Hand voll Jubel [A Handful of Jubilation], 1934.
- Der Denker [The Thinker], 1950.

Periodicals edited:

- Die Frau [The Woman], 1893-1944,
- Hilfe [Help], 1915-1940.
- Handbuch der Frauenbewegung [Handbook of the Women's Movement], 1901-1906.
