= Elisabeth Altmann-Gottheiner =

German economist and activist (1874–1930)

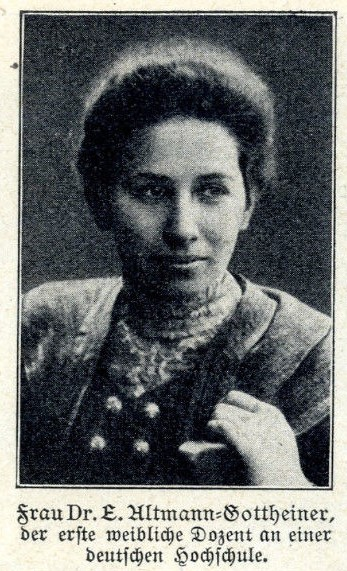
- Born: March 26, 1874; Berlin
- Died: October 21, 1930 (aged 56); Mannheim
- Education: University of Berlin
- Occupation: Economist
- Organization: Federation of German Women's Associations

Elisabeth Altmann-Gottheiner (26 March 1874 – 21 October 1930) was a German economist, educator and women's rights activist. She was one of the first women to become a university lecturer in Germany.

== Life ==
Altmann-Gottheiner was born on 26 March 1874 in Berlin. She married economist Samuel Paul Altmann [de] in November 1906.

She began her studies in London, England in 1899 then moved to study at the University of Berlin. In 1903, she received a doctorate in Zürich, Switzerland. By 1908, she was a lecturer at the economic College in Mannheim, and by 1924 had a professorship in economics.

She was a board member of the Federation of German Women's Associations (German: Bund Deutscher Frauenvereine, BDF) and was involved in the Progressive People's Party (German: Fortschrittliche Volkspartei).

She died on 21 October 1930 in Mannheim, aged 56.

== Academics ==
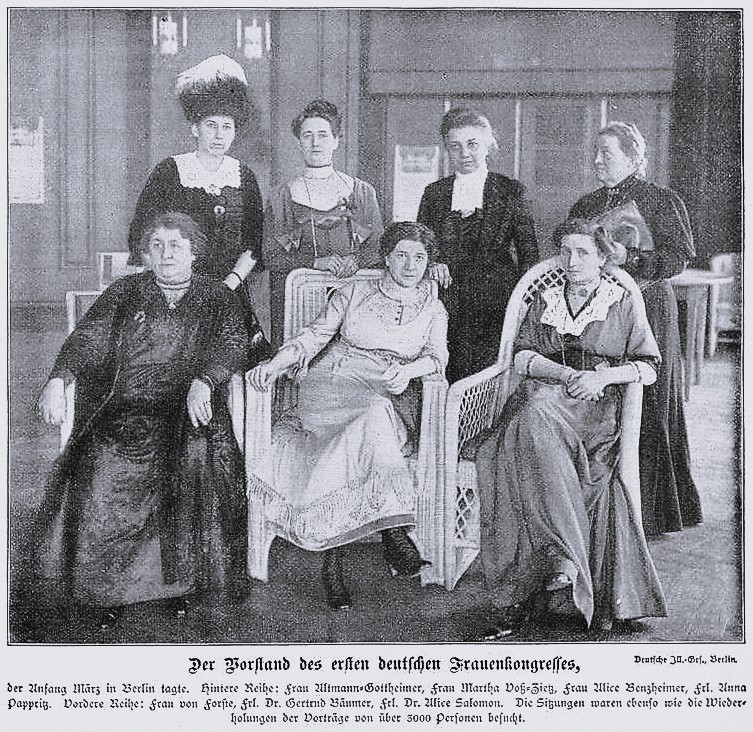
The Board of Directors of the German Women's Congress 1912 (German: Deutscher Frauenkongreß), including (back row from the left): Altmann-Gottheiner, Martha Voß-Zietz, Alice Bensheimer, Anna Pappritz, (front row from the left) Helene von Forster, Gertrud Bäumer and Alice Salomon

She wrote a number of books and articles on economic questions. From 1912 to 1920 she edited the feminist yearbook of the BDF, Jahrbuch der Frauenbewegung.

The University of Mannheim grants the annual award "Elisabeth Altmann-Gottheiner-Preis" for students' theses on gender research.
