= Hilde Lion =

Hilde Gudilla Lion (1893–1970) was a German Jewish academic and teacher of social workers who emigrated to England in 1933, after the Nazi seizure of power. She founded Stoatley Rough School in the Quaker tradition for German refugees in 1934 and was its headmistress until 1960. Dr. Emmy Wolff became second in command at the school in 1937.
