= List of German suffragists =

This is a list of German suffragists who were born in Germany or whose lives and works are closely associated with that country.

== Suffragists ==
- Jenny Apolant (1874–1925) – Jewish feminist, suffragist
- Anita Augspurg (1857–1943) – jurist, actress, writer, pacifist, suffragist
- Luise Büchner (1821–1877) – writer, women's rights activist
- Marie Calm (1832–1887) – educator, writer
- Minna Cauer (1841–1922) – educator, journalist, women's rights proponent, suffragist
- Adela Coit (1863–1932) – suffragist
- Hedwig Dohm (1831–1919) – feminist, writer, pacifist
- Henriette Goldschmidt (1825–1920) – feminist, social worker
- Lida Gustava Heymann (1868–1943) – women's rights activist, suffragist
- Marie Loeper-Housselle (1837–1916) – educator
- Luise Koch (1860–1934) – educator, women's rights activist, suffragist, politician
- Helene Lange (1848–1930) – educator, pioneering women's rights activist, suffragist
- Bertha von Marenholtz-Bülow – educator
- Lina Morgenstern (1830–1909) – educator, women's rights activist
- Louise Otto-Peters (1819–1895) – suffragist, women's rights activist, writer
- Auguste Schmidt (1833–1902) – educator, women's rights activist
- Marie Stritt (1855–1928) – women's rights activist, suffragist, leading member of the International Woman Suffrage Alliance
- Martha Voß-Zietz (1871–1961), conservative and women's rights activist, founder of the Deutscher Verband für Frauenstimmrecht
- Mathilde Weber (1829–1901) – social worker
- Clara Zetkin (1857–1933) – Marxist theorist, women's rights activist, suffragist, politician

== See also ==
- List of suffragists and suffragettes
- Timeline of women's suffrage
- Women in Germany
