= Jeanette Schwerin =

German women's rights activist

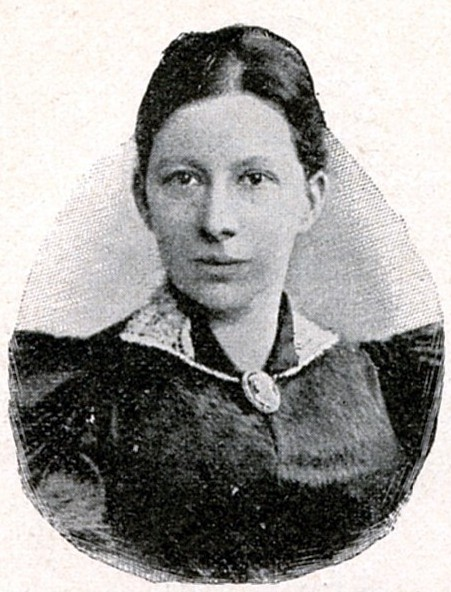
- Born: Jeannette Abarbanell; 21 November 1852; Berlin, Germany
- Died: 14 July 1899 (aged 46); Berlin, Germany
- Occupations: Women's rights activist Social work pioneer
- Spouse: Ernst Alfred Schwerin
- Children: Moritz Eduard Schwerin (1873–1914)
- Parent(s): Eduard Abarbanell (1880–1865); Johanna Henriette Wolffenstein

Jeanette Schwerin (born Jeannette Abarbanell; 21 November 1852 – 14 July 1899) was a German women's rights activist and a social work pioneer.

== Life ==
Jeannette Abarbanell was born in Berlin into a prosperous liberal Jewish family. Eduard Abarbanell (1880–1865) was a well-respected physician who had backed the liberal democratic aspirations of the 1848 revolutionaries. Hungry for learning, after a year, on the recommendation of a teacher, she removed herself from school and educated herself using a self-developed approach that involved extracting, interpreting and commenting on texts. By the time she was grown up she was exceptionally eloquent and well-read. She never lost her appetite for autodidactic education, and was able to deepen her knowledge of History, Philosophy and Applied Economics ("Nationalökonomie") with study at Berlin University. When she was 20 she married Ernst Schwerin, another doctor. He shared her religious background and family tradition of socially based community mutual care. Their son, Moritz Schwerin (1873–1914) was delicate and needed a lot of care when he was small, but as he grew up Jeanette Schwerin became increasingly involved in social work and in the women's movement.

She joined Berlin's Verein Frauenwohl ("Women's Welfare League"), the year of its creation by Minna Cauer. She quickly became part of a small energetic network of feminist activists that also included Lina Morgenstern and Helene Lange. In 1892 Schwerin and her husband were founder members of the "German Society for Ethnic Culture" ("Deutsche Gesellschaft für ethische Kultur") which in 1906 became the Berlin "Centre for Private Welfare" ("Zentrale für private Fürsorge e. V."), intended to campaign against the negative impact of industrialisation - especially on women - and to promote reform of private welfare. Shortly after the society's foundation Jeanette Schwerin set up an information gathering centre which collected information on Berlin's various welfare organisations and initiatives in order to be able to provide emergency assistance to those in need faster and more appropriately.

Schwerin teamed up with Minna Cauer in 1893 to establish the "Girls' and Women's Group for Social Work" ("Mädchen- und Frauengruppen für soziale Hilfsarbeit"). She was initially uncertain about the direction the group might take, warning fellow members to avoid "dangerous dilettantism" and giving her own maxim as "not good works but welfare" ("nicht Wohltätigkeit, sondern Wohlfahrt"). In 1897 she took on the overall leadership of the group and set out an agenda for the year with the goal of training "professionally competent working women for welfare care".

As chair of the "Commission for Female Industry Inspection" of the Association of German Women's Organisations ("Bund Deutscher Frauenvereine" / BDV), in 1894 Jeanette Schwerin submitted a petition to the Reichstag demanding that women should be able to become Industry Inspectors. As a member of the BDV executive (from 1896) she campaigned for collaboration between the middle-class feminist movement and its proletarian counterpart. Shortly before she died she was able to publish the first edition of the BDV journal, "der Centralblatt des Bundes Deutscher Frauenvereine". She also expanded the so-called "Berlin course", which became "an annual course for training professional social work". She was succeeded by Alice Salomon who joined the group in 1895 and quickly became Jeanette Schwerin's "right hand".

Jeanette Schwerin died in Berlin a few months short of her forty-seventh birthday, probably from cancer.
