= Ika Freudenberg =

- Born: Friederike Freudenberg; 25 March 1858; Raubach / Neuwied
- Died: 9 January 1912 (aged 53); Munich
- Known for: Society for Promotion of Intellectual Interests of Women

Friederike, called Ika Freudenberg (25 March 1858 in Raubach/Neuwied – 9 January 1912 in Munich) was a leading protagonist of the women's movement in Bavaria.

== Life and work ==
Ika Freudenberg was the daughter of Johann Philipp Freudenberg (1803-1890), owner of an ironworks, and Caroline Freudenberg (1817-1893), who came from a family of pastors. The father sold the ironworks in the mid-1860, whereupon the family moved to Wiesbaden in 1866. The family soon discovered that Ika had a talent for music and allowed her to study piano at a conservatory run by the eldest son, Wilhelm Freudenberg, who was a conductor and professor of music in Berlin.

Freudenberg probably first became active in the women's movement in the early 1890s, together with her life partner Emmy Preusser. Both women were active in an association for female education, where they met Munich-based photographers and feminists Anita Augspurg and Sophia Goudstikker. In 1894, Freudenberg and Preusser moved to Munich, where Freudenberg, Augspurg, and Goudstikker co-founded the first local women's rights group: the Society for Promotion of Intellectual Interests of Women, later renamed Association for Women's Interests. Freudenberg was elected chairwoman and held this office until her death in 1912. Due to Augspurg's and Goudstikker's good connections in the Schwabing Bohème, members soon included prominent women such as writer Gabriele Reuter. Poet Ricarda Huch was also a supporter. Male members included poet Rainer Maria Rilke and satirist Ernst von Wolzogen who once immortalised the association's leaders in his satire The Third Sex (1899). The text is peculiar, in that it contains good-natured mockery and at the same time publicly alludes to the fact that most of the figureheads of the associations were lesbians. There is no evidence that any of the women took any major offence at the piece.

The Association for Women's Interests organised consultancy and job placement services for working women, offered platforms and support for working women who wanted to organise themselves, and ran a free legal service for women. The latter was led by Sophia Goudstikker, who, although not a lawyer, obtained permission to plead in local courts and often did so to great success. In 1899, the Association organised the first ever Bavarian Women's Conference.

Freudenberg's partner died in 1899 after a long illness. A few months later, Freudenberg moved in with Sophia Goudstikker, whose relationship with Anita Augspurg had just ended. Eventually, Freudenberg and Goudstikker were to be seen as a couple, although they both left each other their freedoms.

In 1905, Freudenberg was diagnosed with breast cancer. She was operated on several times. She continued her work until her strength gave in, and was known to chair meetings as late as in November 1911. On January 9, 1912, Ika Freudenberg died in Munich.

Ika Freudenberg was immensely popular. Contemporaries described her as humorous and appreciated her diplomatic skills. Politically, she was a liberal, but she always advocated a good and respectful cooperation between bourgeois and proletarian women.

== Awards ==
On 30 September 2004, a street was named after her in Munich, by decision of the City Council.

== Publications ==
- Der Bund Deutscher Frauenvereine: eine Darlegung seiner Aufgaben und Ziele und seiner bisherigen Entwickelung, nebst einer kurzgefassten Übersicht über die Thätigkeit seiner Arbeits-Kommissionen. Mit Marie Stritt; Bund Deutscher Frauenvereine, Frankenberg (Sachsen). L. Reisel, 1900.
- Ein Wort an die weibliche Jugend. Leipzig, Verlag der Frauen-Rundschau, 1903.
- Die Frau und die Politik. Mit Wilhelm Ohr; Nationalverein für das liberale Deutschland. München, Heller 1908
- Weshalb wendet sich die Frauenbewegung an die Jugend? Leipzig, Voigtländer, 1907.
- Was die Frauenbewegung erreicht hat. München: Buchhandlung National-Verein, 1910.
- Die Frau und die Kultur des öffentlichen Lebens. Leipzig, C. F. Amelang, 1911.
- Grundsätze und Forderungen der Frauenbewegung. Mit Helene Lange; Anna Pappritz; Elisabeth Altmann-Gottheiner. Leipzig, 1912.
- Was die Frauenbewegung erreicht hat. München, Buchhandlung Nationalverein, 1912.

== Sources ==
- Marita A. Panzer, Elisabeth Plößl: Bavarias Töchter. Frauenporträts aus fünf Jahrhunderten. Pustet, Regensburg 1997. ISBN 3-7917-1564-X
- Heiner Feldhoff, Carl Gneist: Westerwälder Köpfe. 33 Porträts herausragender Persönlichkeiten. Rhein-Mosel-Verlag, Zell/Mosel 2014. ISBN 978-3-89801-073-3
