= Bertha Kipfmüller =

German teacher and independent scholar

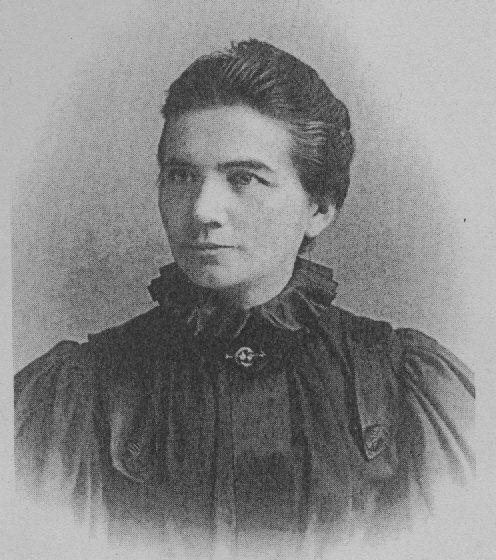
ca. 1900

Bertha Kipfmüller (28 February 1861 – 3 March 1948) was described by an admiring journalist as a "small person with a powerful voice and an iron will". Her work as a German school teacher made her a women's rights activist and a pioneering figure in respect of women's education. She was, in addition, a committed pacifist during a period remembered for intensifying nationalist-populism in Europe, a linguistic genius and a passionate believer in life-long learning.

In 1899 Kipfmüller became the first woman in Bavaria to receive a doctorate. In 1929, after retiring from her work as a school teacher, she earned a second doctorate. In 1942 she wrote her autobiography, using notebook diaries. It had been her intention that it should be published during her lifetime. That did not happen; but 65 years after her death it was, triggering a renewed interest in her life and achievements. One reason that it had not been published sooner was that she wrote much of it using Gabelsberger shorthand, which presumably made sense at a time when writing paper was in short supply. But it was a form of shorthand that had not been widely used or understood, even in Germany, since the 1920s. It was her great x 2 nephew, Hans-Peter Kipfmüller, who mastered the script and transcribed the book into a more usable format, before arranging for its publication.

== Life ==
=== Provenance and early years ===
Bertha Friederika Kipfmüller was born and grew up in Pappenheim, a small town in the Franconian hill-country between Nuremberg and Augsburg. She was one of eleven recorded children of the jeweler-goldsmith Christian Albert Kipfmüller (1822–1898) and his wife, born Christina Sabina Rist (1827–1916). She successfully completed junior school locally, and then between 1874 and 1877 was privately tutored by a Pappenheim teacher called Josef Fleischmann, who prepared her for the entrance exam for admission to the Upper Bavaria Teacher Training Seminary ("Kreislehrerinnenseminar für Oberbayern") in Munich. In order to prepare for the exam she was obliged to depend on private tutoring since the relevant government "preparatory school" only provided places to candidates who were boys. Kipfmüller completed the teaching course and in 1879, still in Munich, passed the appropriate teaching exams.

=== Teacher and organiser ===
Between 1879 and 1896 Kipfmüller worked as a teacher at junior schools at, successively, Eysölden (Thalmässing), Heilsbronn Abbey (Ansbach) and, from 1886, Schoppershof, a little town just outside Nuremberg (into which it has subsequently been subsumed). She would have liked to have taught at a school in Nuremberg itself, but at that time, under Mayor von Reichenbach and his successor, Mayor von Schuh, the schools in the city employed only men as teachers. The injustice of the situation angered her.

In 1886 she founded the "Middle Franconia Women Teachers' Association" ("Mittelfränkischer Lehrerinnenverein"), which was the first professional association for women anywhere in Bavaria. In 1890 she was a co-founder of the "German Women Teachers' Association" ("Allgemeiner Deutscher Lehrerinnenverein"), a Pan-German coming together of a number of regional organisations with similar objectives. She also engaged with the women's rights movement more broadly, alongside some of the leading rights activists on the national stage such as Auguste Schmidt, Helene Lange and the publisher of the journal "The Woman Teacher in School and Home" ("Die Lehrerin in Schule und Haus"), Marie Loeper-Housselle. She made it her mission to ensure that the Nuremberg-based "Middle Franconia Women Teachers' Association" worked effectively in concert with the national "German Women Teachers' Association".

=== Peace ===
In her posthumously published memoires Kipfmüller would recall that she came to Pacifism as early as 1886 through studying Kant and to socialism in 1890 through studying the (at that time hugely influential in Germany) writings of August Bebel. (Note: The precision with which Bertha Kipfmüller was able to give these dates is the result of her having been able to consult the personal diary which she kept between 1884 and 1948. By the time she made the final entry, four days before she died, it extended to 60 volumes, which indicates that it probabably contained a considerable amount of detail.) In April 1893 she joined the "German Peace Society" ("Deutsche Friedensgesellschaft " / DFG), which had been founded at the end of the previous year. Under the pseudonym "Berthold Friederici", and encouraged by Bertha von Suttner, in 1896 she published her little anti-war book, "Sedansgedanken" (loosely, "Thoughts on Sedan"), referencing the 1871 Battle of Sedan which had cleared the way for German unification. The book was deeply critical of militarism and the glorification of war.

=== Women's welfare ===
During 1895 she teamed up with Helene von Forster to found, formally on 16 November, the Nuremberg section of the Verein Frauenwohl ("Women's Welfare Association"), committed to improving conditions for women in the city and surrounding region. Helped by donations from wealthy local citizens the association was able to set up a maternity centre for women in need, along with an institute for the blind. Sewing and handcraft courses were also organised in order to provide women with improved opportunities for earning a living, and the association backed up its initiatives by establishing an appropriately stocked library.

=== Life-long learning ===
Her rejection of the widespread view that women were not suited to further education, combined with her own private study which at the time was focused on Kantian philosophy, languages and linguistics, drove Kipfmüller to the conviction that she needed to obtain a degree in Philology. In order to access a university education it was necessary to pass the "Abitur" (school final exams). Unfortunately, in Germany none of the girls' secondary schools prepared their pupils for the "Abitur", so Bertha Kipfmüller had never been entered for the exam. She therefore prepared to prepare for and take the exams as a foreign student in Switzerland where, despite entrenched conservatism across much of the education system, the decentralised nature of political power meant that there was an element of flexibility, especially in one or two of the cities, that was absent from the more rigid German education framework. Meanwhile, 1894 she embarked on a self-study programme of the "Abitur" syllabus in 1894, using the material that was distributed to the (boys') secondary schools. A change of plan became possible in 1895 when the Heidelberg University introduced a concessionary arrangement whereby, exceptionally, female school teachers, might attend university lectures as "guest listeners", despite the handicap of their gender, even if they had not been able to fulfil the legal precondition of an "Abitur" pass. Kipfmüller was admitted to join university lectures on the basis, starting with the 1896/97 winter term.

Kipfmüller used the opportunities arising at Heidelberg to embark on a broad range of university-level studies that embraced Germanistics, Sanskrit, Comparative philology, Philosophy, History and "Nationalökonomie" (very loosely, "Applied economics"). She received her doctorate of philosophy in 1899. Her dissertation, subsequently published in book form with a dedication to the memory of her father, concerned the light-hearted stage works of the eighteenth-century theatrical polymath August Wilhelm Iffland. After that she returned to the Franconian heartland and resumed her teaching career, now armed with the first doctoral qualification awarded to any Bavarian woman. Unlike similarly male colleagues, her salary level as a junior school teacher remained initially at the same level as before. Little by little it was increased, but it was only in 1926, after she has retired from her career as a school teacher, that she received the status of a (retired) "Studienrätin", a designation which under other circumstances she would probably have received in 1879.

=== On the fringes of politics ===
Meanwhile, she continued to find time for activism and campaigning. She co-founded the Richard Wagner Association of German Women ("Richard-Wagner-Verband deutscher Frauen") . A more progressive process, starting in 1898, was the creation through amalgamations of the Bavarian Association of Men and Women Teachers ("Bayerischer Lehrer- und Lehrerinnenverband"), of which Kipfmüller can also be seen as a co-founder. Following the slaughter of the First World War, Bertha Kipfmüller was one of many Germans who felt both called and able to participate more directly in national politics. November 1918 delivered votes for women, effect January 1919, and a new republican constitution. In 1919 Kipfmüller joined the Social Democratic Party (SPD). Later she joined the Association of Socialist German Teachers ("Verband Sozialistischer Lehrer und Lehrerinnen"). She also chaired the Nuremberg branch of the "Verein für das Deutschtum im Ausland" (VDA - as the "Association for German cultural relations abroad" was known before 1933. During 1933 she was forced to reign from this position when the VDA was converted into a National Socialist organisation.

=== Double doctorate ===
After her retirement she returned to university, enrolling in 1926 at the University of Erlangen (then still separate from the University of Nuremberg) to study Jurisprudence. She completed this part of her studies in 1929, emerging at the age of 68 with her second doctorate. It was entitled "Die Frau im Rechte der Freien Reichsstadt Nürnberg" (loosely, "The legal position of women in Nuremberg [since 1564]"). An unusual feature of this doctorate was the status that it conferred on its recipient as a "Doctor utriusque iuris" ("Doctor of both laws"): it counted as a doctorate in both civil law and church law.

=== Languages and linguistics ===
In 1934 she spent time in Jena studying religious philosophy. She returned home to Pappenheim in 1935. Her appetite for knowledge was evidently undiminished.

One personal aspect of Kipfmüller's commitment to lifelong learning was her fascination with languages, of which by the time she died she had learned twelve. In 1938, aged 77, she spent several months living at the Harnack House in Berlin-Dahlem. Harnack House was home to the Kaiser Wilhelm [scientific] Society, but on this occasion its attraction to Kipfmüller was its proximity to Berlin University, where she was able to improve her Mandarin while studying Sinology more broadly. During 1939/40 she learned Polish. As the war drew to its close she became convinced that the whole of Germany was likely to be occupied for the foreseeable future by Soviet troops and started learning Russian. Soon she was also offering Russian language lessons to the townsfolk of Pappenheim.

In 1946 she was made an "Ehrenbürgerin" (loosely, "honoured citizen") of her home town. She also helped to establish the municipal "Kulturreferat" (arts and culture bureau) in Pappenheim.

== Personal ==
While she was working at Eysölden, Bertha Kipfmüller met a young army officer who was still recovering from physical and psychological wounds inflicted by participation in the Franco-Prussian War. He was living in a little foresters' lodge at Stauf. The social conventions of the time restricted the extent of the ensuing romance, and Bertha's father could not afford the financial contribution that would have facilitated marriage. Social conventions were also against the blossoming of the romance in another way. Female teachers were expected to remain single and celibate. Those unable to persist with the celibacy were expected to retire from the teaching in order concentrate on marriage and motherhood. The dilemma was unresolved when the young man's period of convalescence came to an end, and he was posted some distance away. Shortly after that the matter was cruelly put to rest when he committed suicide.

Deeply traumatised by the tragic ending of what at least one commentator sees as the great love of her life, Kipfmüller resolved to stay single, and commit her apparently undiminished reserves of energy to her work, her study and her campaigning.

== Kipfmüller archive ==
The 60 volumes of the personal diaries that Kipfmüller wrote up between 1884 and 1948 are held as the "Dr.-Dr.-Bertha-Kipfmüller-Archiv" at the Historical Institute in Karlsruhe, where in recent years Professor Sabine Liebig has been supporting Hans-Peter Kipfmüller with his researches and publications on the life and achievements of his great x 2 aunt. Also gathered there are some of the many lecture notes, newspaper articles that Bertha Kipfmüller accumulated, together with several letters. A smaller part of her "literary estate" is held at the University Library of Eichstätt-Ingolstadt.
