= Minna Cauer =

German journalist, editor

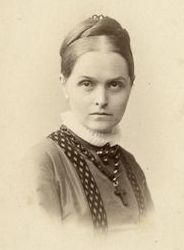
- Minna Cauer, photo by photographer Theodor Prümm, 1870
- Born: 1 November 1841
- Died: 3 August 1922 (aged 80)
- Occupations: pedagogue; journalist; activist

Wilhelmine Theodore Marie Cauer, née Schelle, usually known as Minna Cauer (1 November 1841 in Freyenstein – 3 August 1922 in Berlin), was a German pedagogue, activist in the so-called "radical" wing of the German bourgeois feminist movement, pacifist and journalist. Alongside Anita Augspurg, Cauer was the most prominent figure in the radical feminist movement. In the 1890s she was the undisputed representative and had a special talent for winning over new and younger women to the feminist movement.

== Life ==
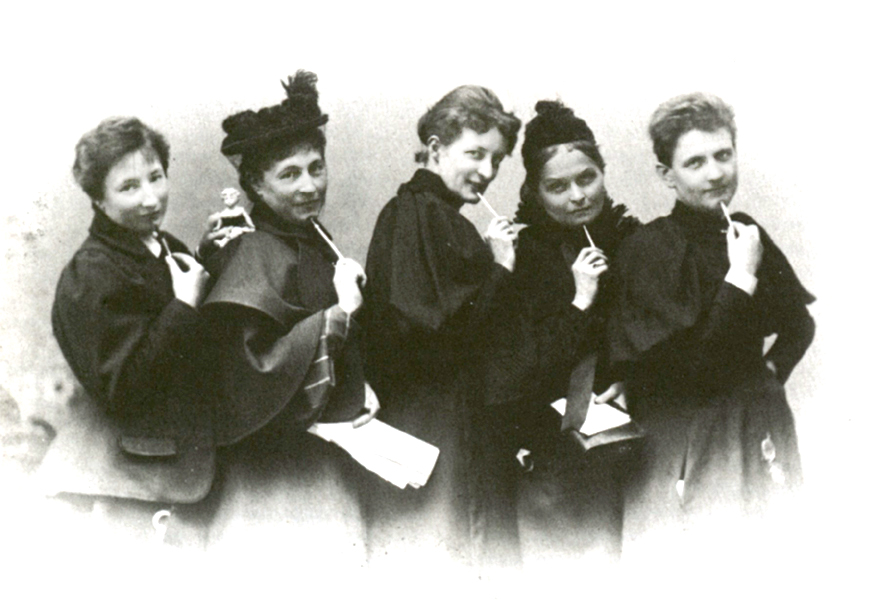
Cauer and her companions from the Deutscher Verband für Frauenstimmrecht (German Association for Women's Suffrage), from left to right: Anita Augspurg, Marie Stritt, Lily Braun (then Lily von Gizycki), Minna Cauer and Sophia Goudstikker, at Hofatelier Elvira, circa 1896

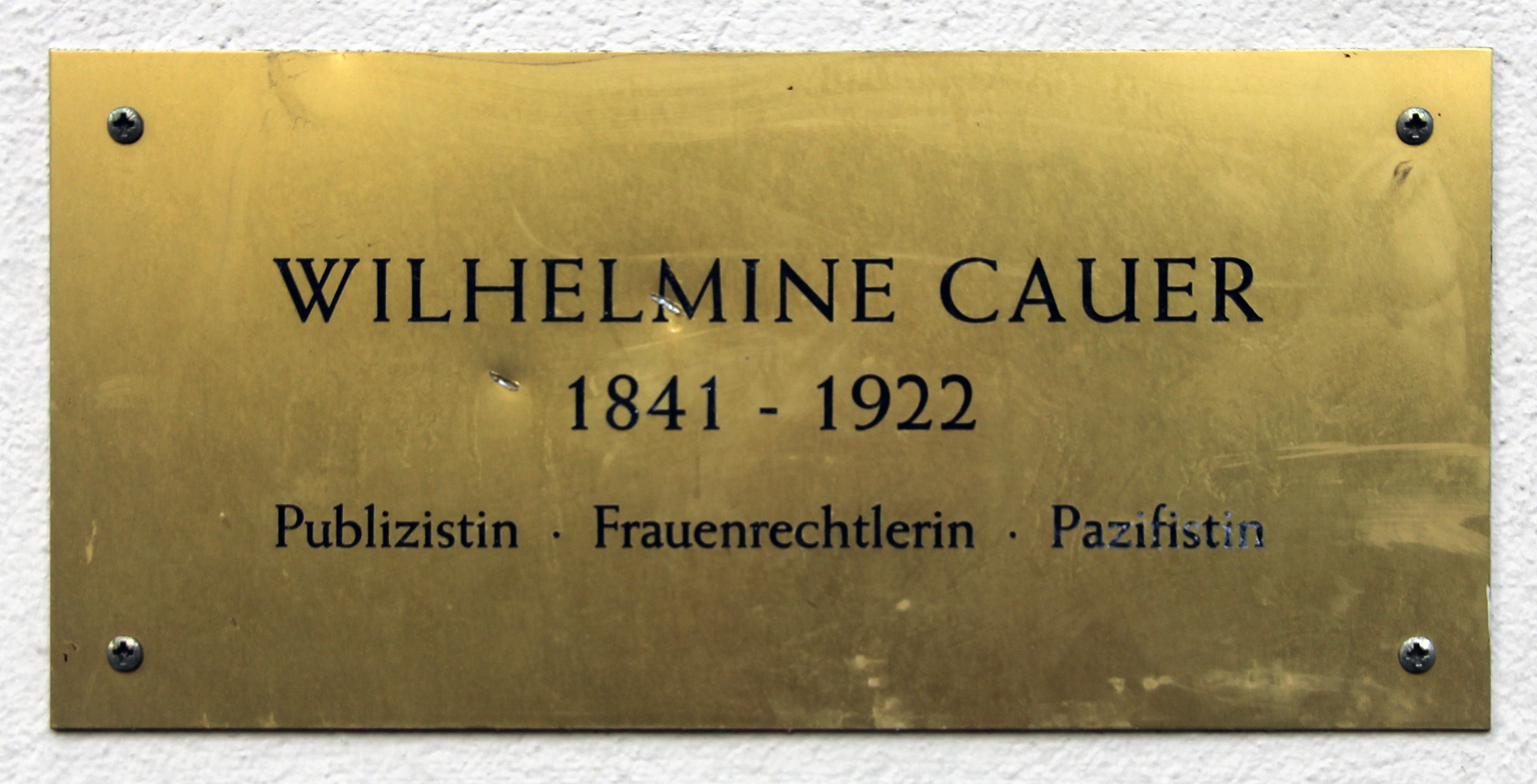
Memorial plaque on the house at Mansteinstrasse 8 in Berlin-Schöneberg

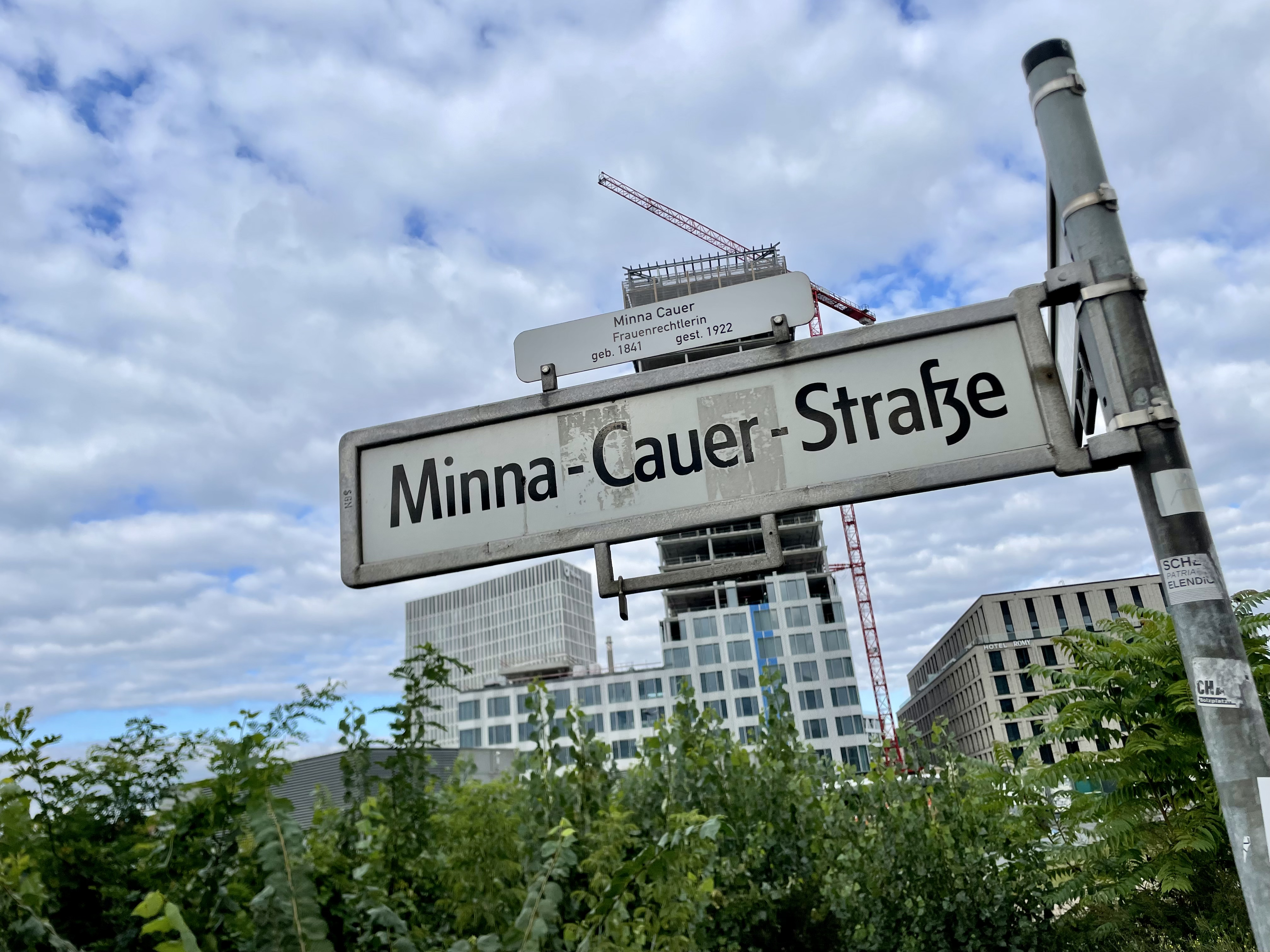
Street name sign at Berlin Hauptbahnhof Central Station

The daughter of a Lutheran pastor, Cauer grew up in Freyenstein, in the Province of Brandenburg. She married a left-wing educator and physician, August Latzel in 1862, but was widowed in 1866. She then trained as a teacher, working in Paris for a year before marrying Eduard Cauer, a school inspector, and moving with him to Berlin.

Widowed for a second time in 1881, Cauer resumed work as a teacher and started studying women's history. She founded Frauenwohl (Women's Welfare Association) in Berlin in 1888, leading it until 1919, campaigning for women's rights and abortion rights.

With Helene Lange and Franzisca Tiburtius she worked to establish the Realkurse girls' high school in Berlin, which opened in 1889 as the first educational establishment to prepare women for university study. She founded the Commercial Union of Female Salaried Employees, one of the first nonpolitical women's trade unions, in 1889. In 1893 she cofounded the Girls' and Women's Groups for Social Assistance Work (Mädchen- und Frauengruppen für Soziale Hilfsarbeit). In 1894 she joined with Anita Augspurg and Marie Stritt to establish the Federation of German Women's Associations (FGWA) She worked for the feminist newspaper Die Frauenbewegung (The Women's Movement) from 1895 to 1919. In 1896 she was president at the International Congress of Women's Work and Women's Endeavours in Berlin, the first international women's conference to be held in Germany.

Increasingly radical, Cauer helped establish the Union of Progressive Women's Associations in 1899. In 1902 the suffrage movement gained the backing of the FGWA, leading Cauer, Augspurg, Stritt, and Lida Gustava Heymann to co-found the German Union for Women's Suffrage (Deutscher Verband fur Frauenstimmrecht), which pursued both suffrage cause and moral campaigns, such as that against state-regulated prostitution. In 1908, frustrated by the disinterest of the Free-minded People's Party in women's suffrage, Cauer founded a more militant group, the Prussian Union for Women's Suffrage. She joined the left-liberal Democratic Union. Resigning from the suffrage union in 1912, she joined a new German Women's Suffrage Association in 1914. However, with the German women's suffrage movement in disarray, Cauer turned to pacifist activities throughout World War I.

Her papers are held at the International Institute of Social History.
