= Consulate General of the United States, Munich =

Architectural structure

Coordinates: 48°08′43″N 11°35′01″E

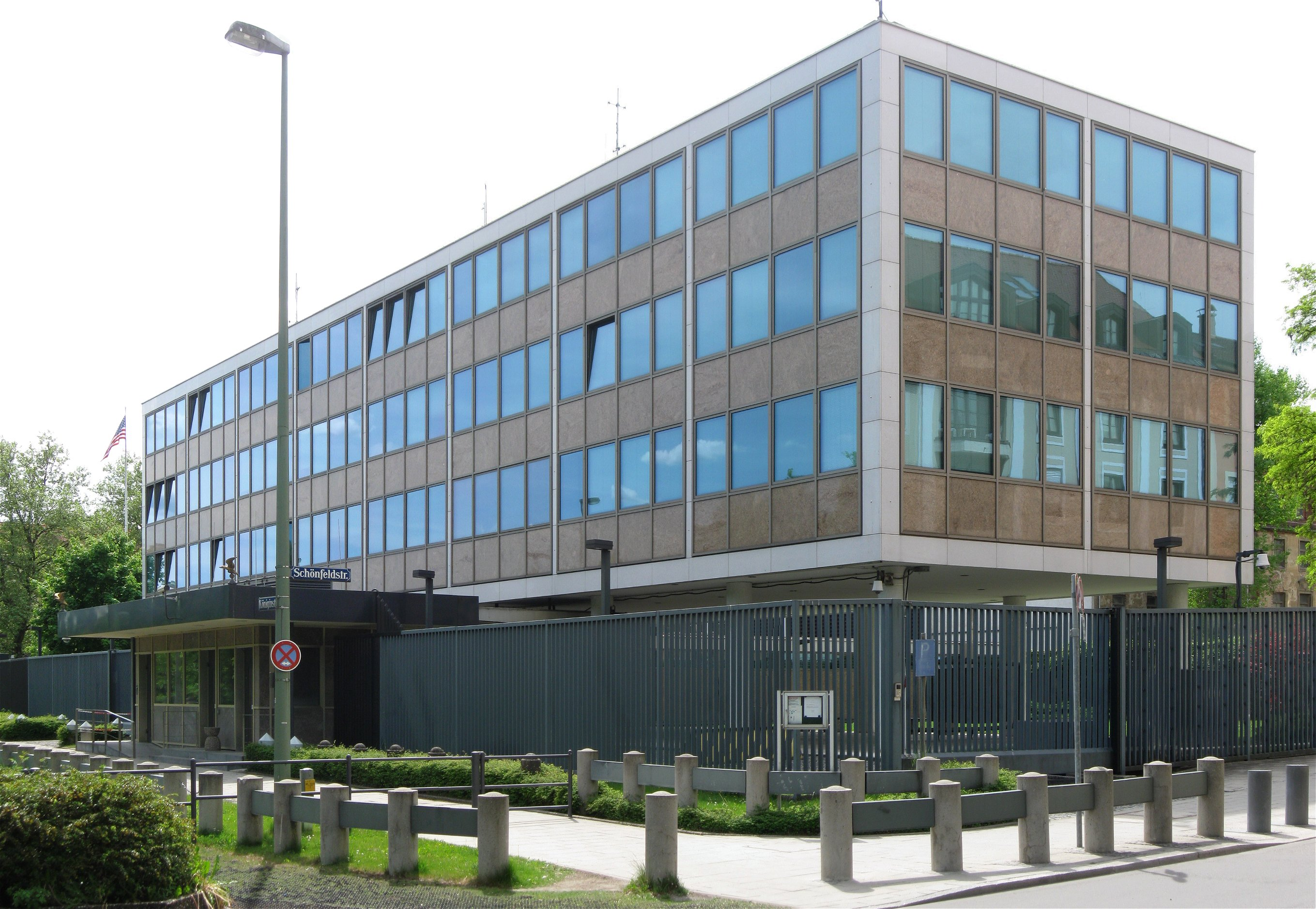
- Location: Munich, Bavaria, Germany
- Address: Königinstraße 5, 80539 München, Federal Republic of Germany
- Opened: Between 1957 and 1959
- Jurisdiction: Bavaria

The Consulate General of the United States, Munich represents the interests of the United States government in Bavaria, Germany. Headed by the Consul General, the Consulate provides services to Americans in Bavaria and fostering Bavarian-American relations.

The Consulate includes departments devoted to US Foreign Commercial Services, Political, Economic and Environmental Affairs, Public Affairs, Consular Services, and Administrative Affairs. It is the third-largest U.S. diplomatic post in Germany, following Berlin and Frankfurt.

== History and architecture ==
Founded in 1835, the consulate has occupied various locations over its history. The consulate's operations were suspended between 1941 and 1945. In 1946, it resumed its functions from a new location before relocating to its current address between 1957 and 1959. The current site previously housed a building designed by August Endell for photographers Sophia Goudstikker and Anita Augspurg. This structure was destroyed in an April 1944 bombing. After the war, the Bavarian state acquired the property and transferred it to the USA.

Initial designs for the new consulate building were proposed by architectural firm Skidmore, Owings and Merrill (SOM), but these plans were rejected by the Munich City Council. After multiple revisions by Sep Ruf, a modern design was approved and the building was constructed. The consulate occupies a uniquely constructed office building, the last of the signature modernist U.S. Consulates constructed in Germany in the 1950s still in operation. Designed by Bavarian architect Sep Ruf, the building is recognized as a historic monument. Originally elevated on concrete stilts to give an airy appearance, security enhancements added after 1985 have overshadowed this effect.

The Consulate is closed on both American and Bavarian/German holidays.
