= Freyenstein =

Former town in Brandenburg, Germany

Coordinates: 53°17′N 12°21′E

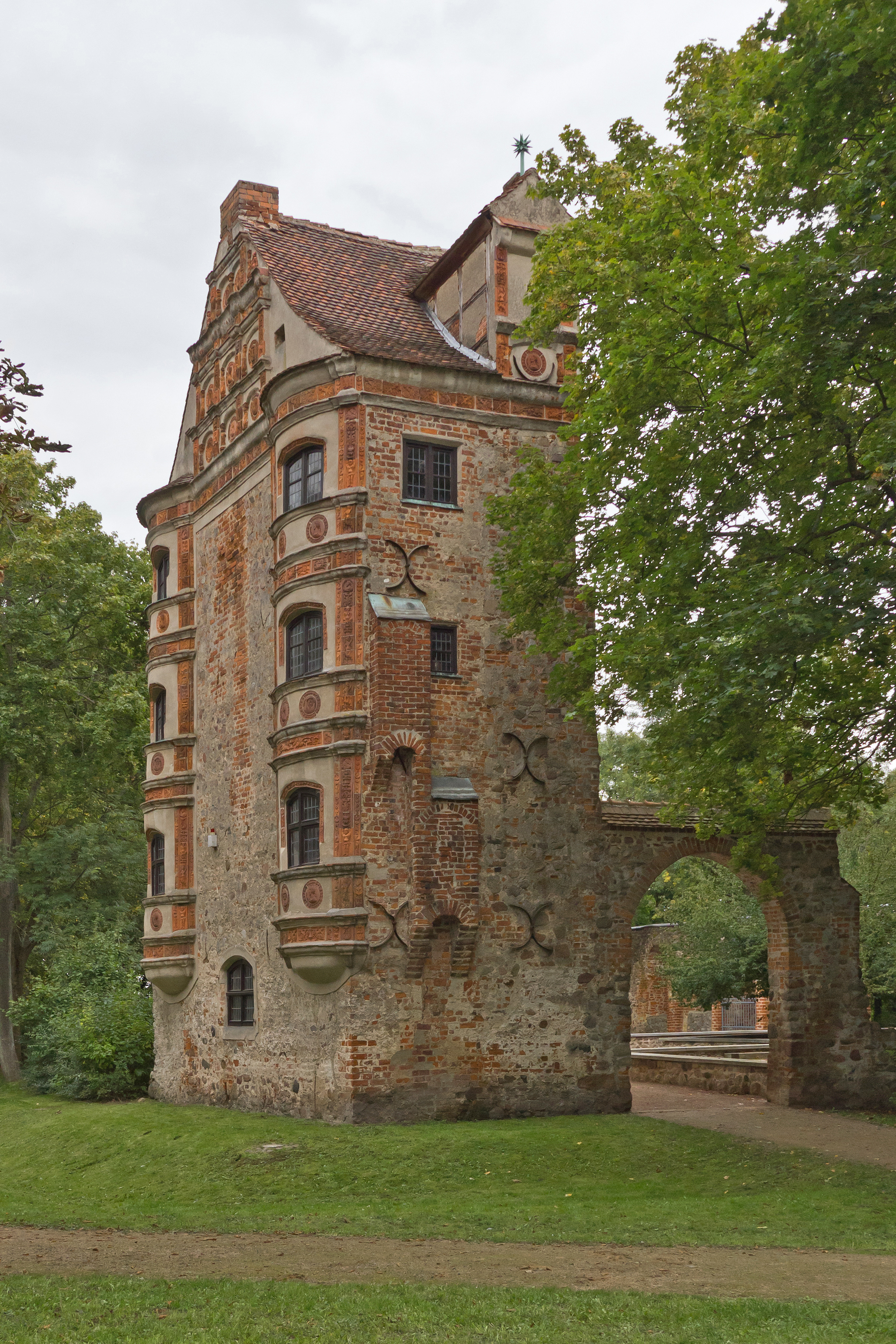
Castle Freyenstein of the Von Rohr family

Freyenstein is a former small town in Brandenburg, Germany. On October 26, 2003 it was merged into the city of Wittstock. The earliest mention of the town was in 1263 as "Vriegenstene". The town had 971 inhabitants on December 31, 2009.

== Natives ==
- Minna Cauer (1841-1922), German feminist
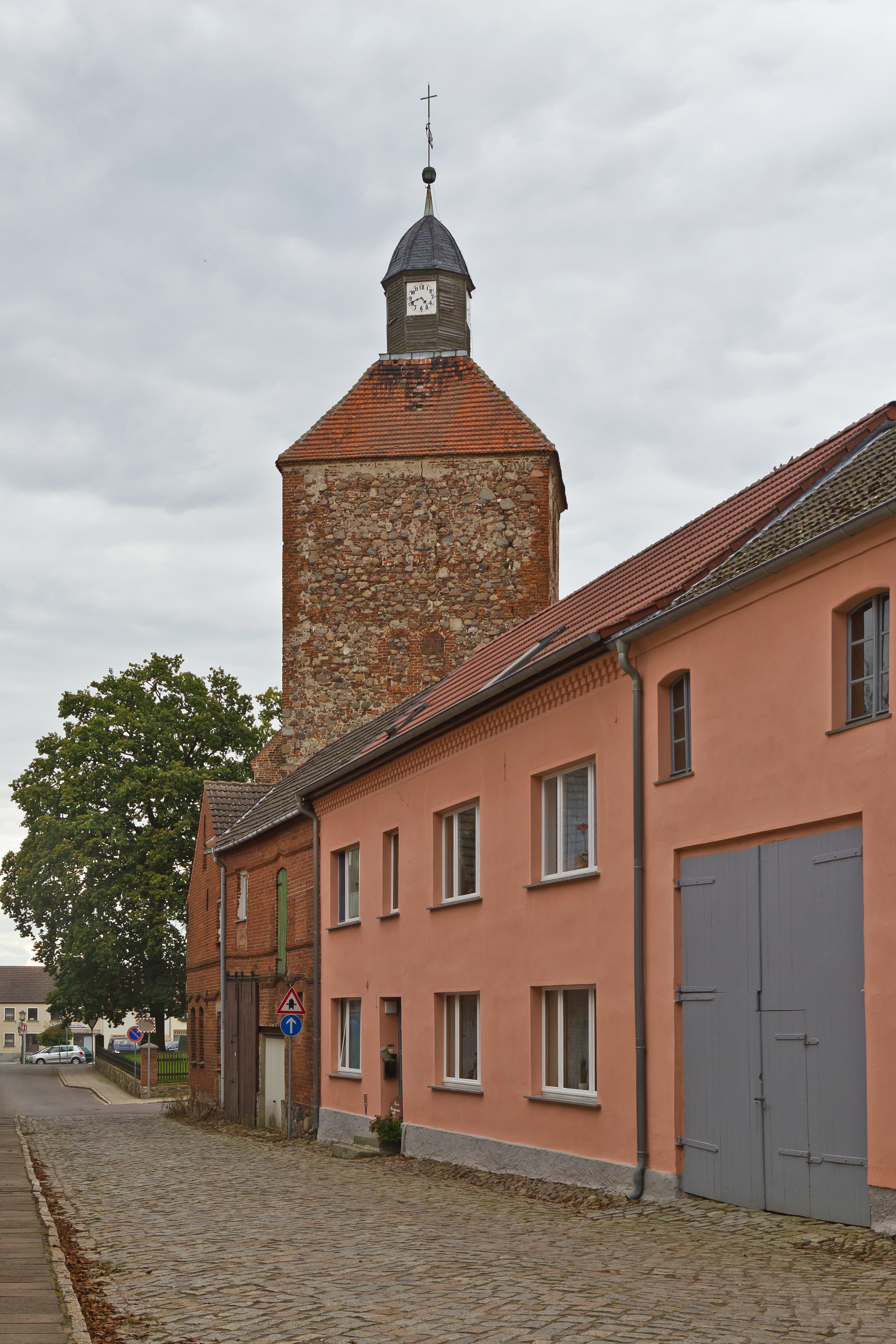
Freyenstein parish church

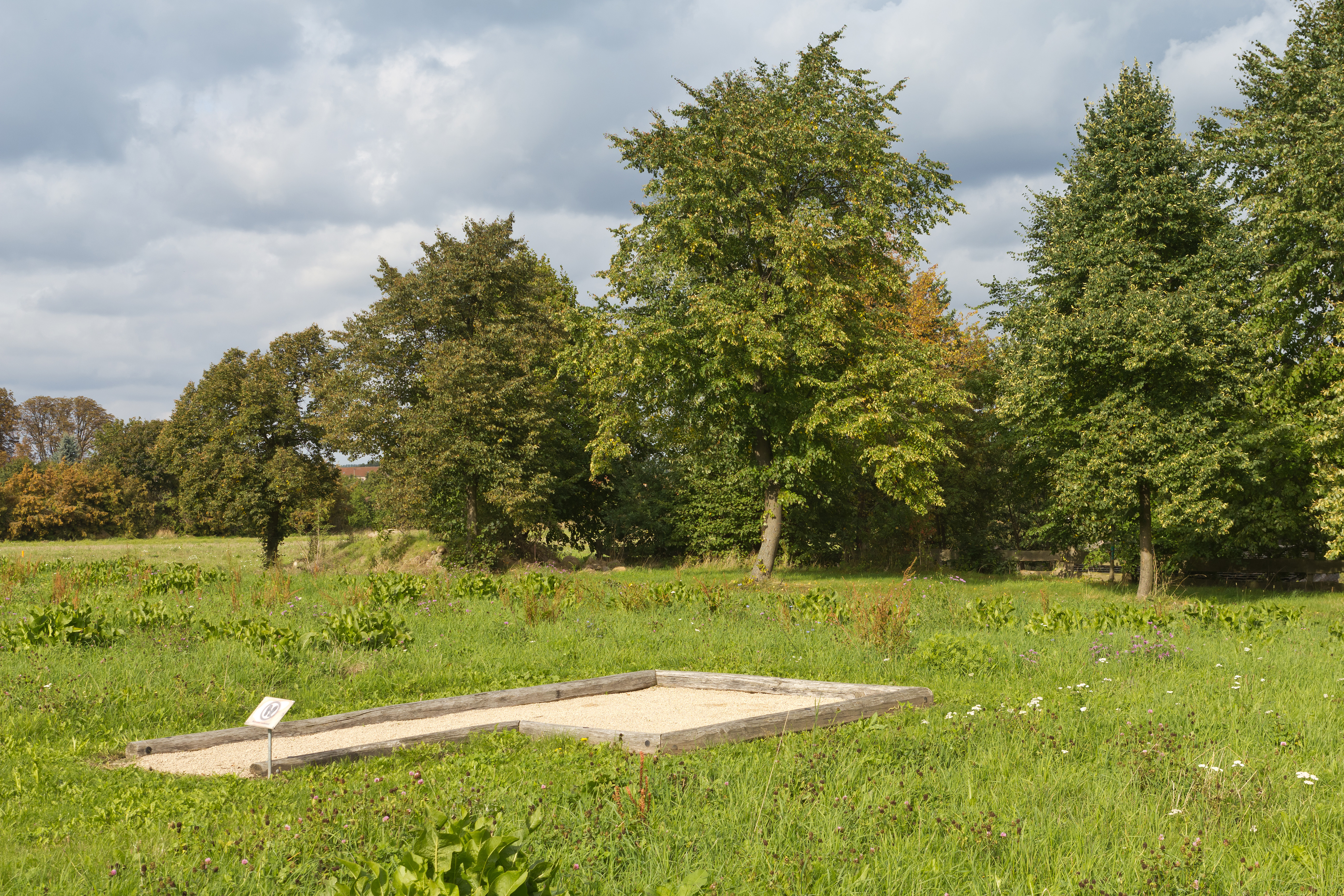
Freyenstein archaeological site

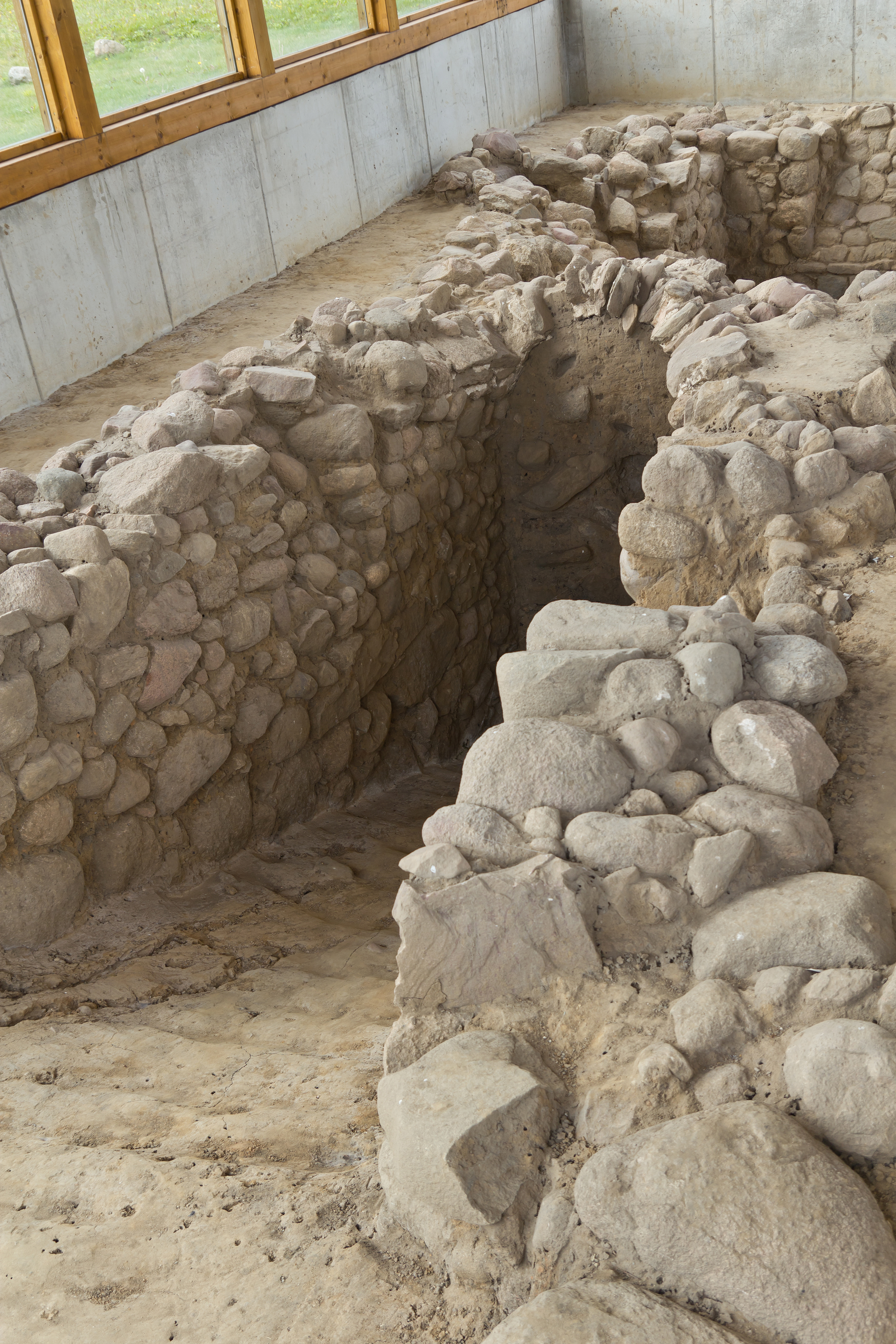
Freyenstein archaeological site
