= Agnes Gosche =

German teacher and art historian {1857-1928)

- Born: August 26, 1857; Berlin, Germany
- Died: March 14, 1928 (aged 70); Halle (Saale), Germany

Agnes Gosche (1857-1928) was a German teacher and art historian.

Gosche was born on August 26, 1857 in Berlin, Germany. She earned her PhD in art history from the University of Zurich in In 1898.

In 1900, Gosche founded the Halleschen Frauenbildungsverein (Halle Women's Education Association) In 1904 Gosche succeeded Henriette Goldschmidt as head of the Lyceums des Vereins für Familien- und Volkserziehung (Lyceum of the Association for Family and Popular Education). She was an advocate of early education, Kindergärten, as well as being an advocate for women's education.

Gosche died on March 14, 1928 in Halle (Saale), Germany.
