= Marie Calm =

German author and feminist

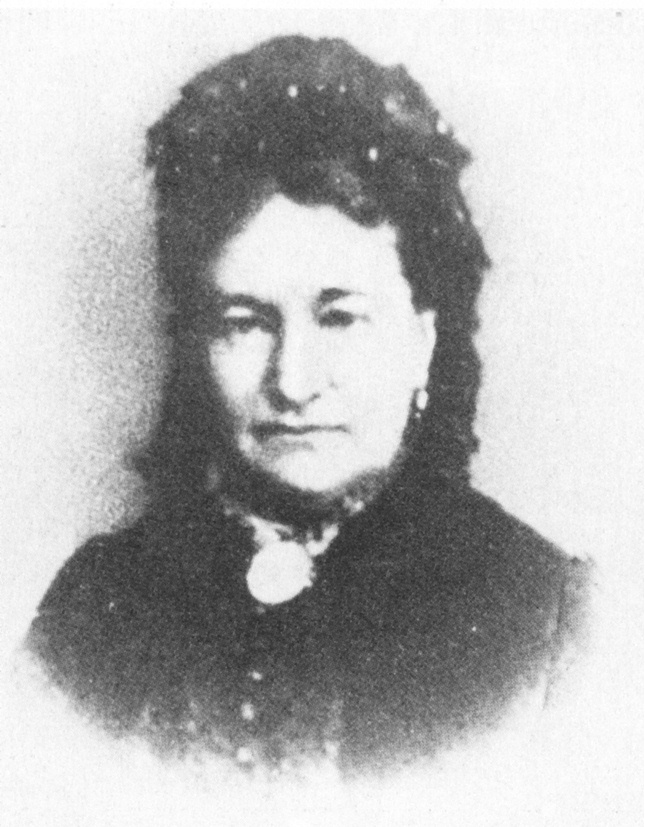
- Born: 3 April 1832; Arolsen, Germany
- Died: 22 February 1887 (aged 54); Kassel, German Empire
- Other names: Marie Ruhland
- Occupations: Educator, Writer

Marie Calm (3 April 1832, Bad Arolsen, Waldeck – 22 February 1887, Kassel, German Empire) was a German author, feminist and advocate of women's suffrage.

== Life ==
Calm was born on 3 April 1832 in Arolsen, Germany. She early became interested in a career as an educator. In 1853 she accepted a position as teacher in England, and in 1858 a position in Russia.

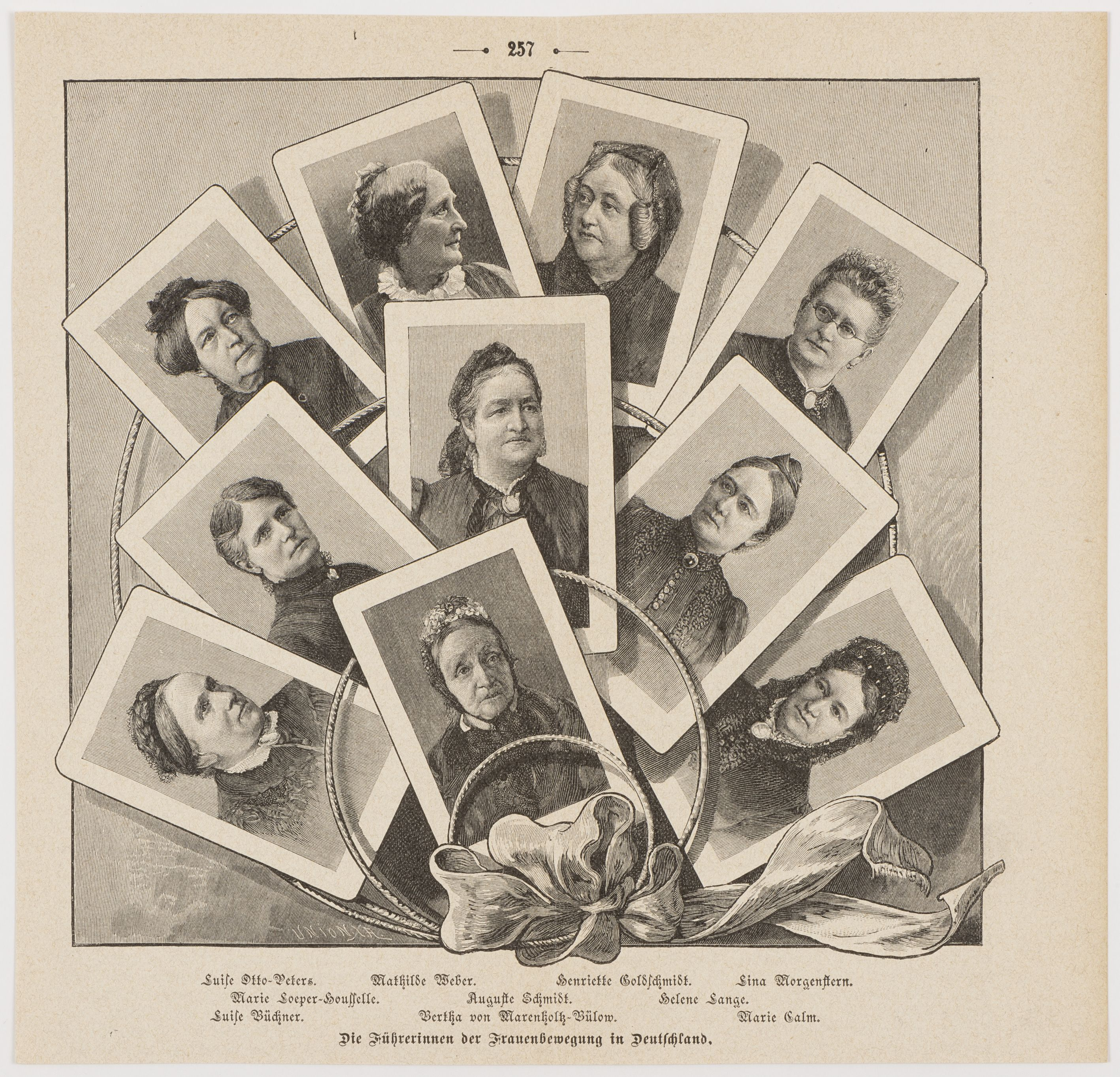
Leaders of the women's movement in Germany, 1894

She managed a seminary for indigent girls at Cassel, and was involved in the establishment of the Association of German Teachers. She was one of the original members of the Allgemeine Deutsche Frauenverein. Also, she was involved in the organization of the Casseler Frauenbildungsverein, which soon opened a technical school for the training of women in home economics. It was the intention of the latter organization to provide more educational opportunities for women, and thus more vocational opportunities, but it was limited at the time to conventionally recognized feminine activities.

Aside from her books on household economics and etiquette, she was the author of: Bilder und Klänge, poems, Cassel, 1871; Weibliches Wirken in Küche, Wohnzimmer, und Salon, Berlin, 1874; third edition, 1882; Leo, a novel, 1876; Ein Blick ins Leben, Stuttgart, 1877; Wilde Blumen a novel, Bremen, 1880; Echter Adel, Stuttgart, 1883; and Bella's Blaubuch, Leipzig, 1883.

Calm died 22 February 1887 in Kassel, Germany.
