= Hofatelier Elvira =

German photography studio

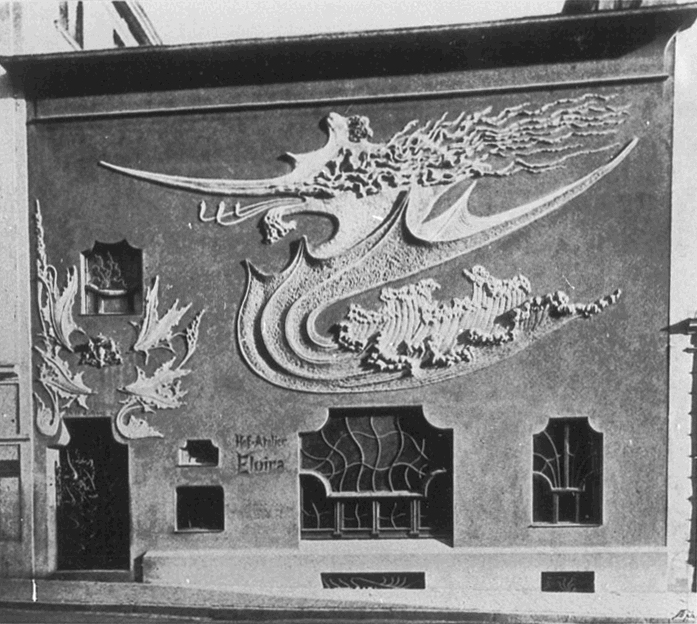
Facade of Hofatelier Elvira, located at Von-der-Tann-Strasse 15, with so-called dragon ornamentation.

The Hofatelier Elvira (tr. Court atelier Elvira, also known as Atelier Elvira or Salon Elvira) was a photography studio in Munich founded by jurist and actress Anita Augspurg and friend photographer Sophia Goudstikker in 1887 and is notable as the first company founded by women in Germany. A branch also existed in Augsburg from 1891. They became especially famous for their work in the feminist movement.

== History ==
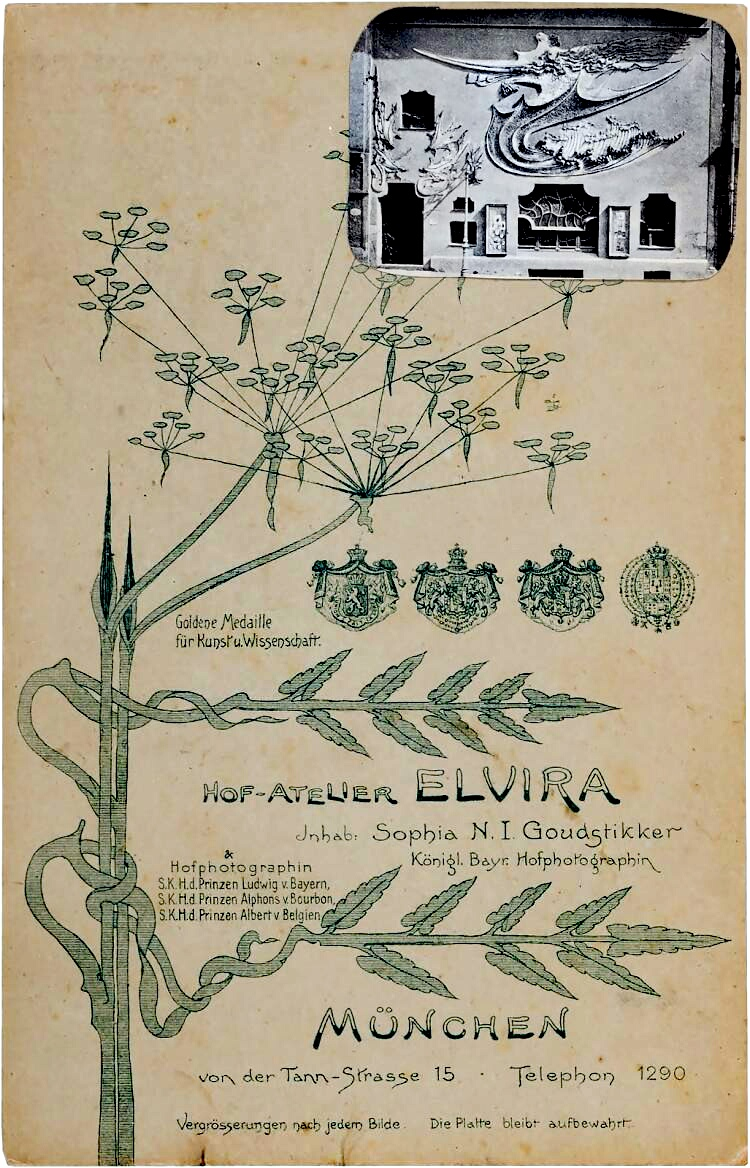
Logo (reverse side of a photograph, 1904)

The new studio building that housed the Munich atelier at Von-der-Tann-Strasse 15, built in 1898, became a prominent structure in the style of Art Nouveau, and the façade was a design by the architect August Endell in the years from 1896 to 1898. Endell's work was influenced by Victor Horta. His plans, were licensed in April 1898 with the remark, that they were a "mockery of drawing art". The façade, with its red and golden dragon-like stucco ornament on a green ground, was especially criticized. The design was called "Octopus Rococo", and the building was variously called the "dragon's castle" or the "Chinese embassy". The Atelier Elvira building was an artist's meeting point from the beginning. Soon after the building was completed, the founders' paths went separate ways. In 1907, Augspurg sold her share to Goudstikker, who later leased it to the young photographer Emma Uibleisen. After World War I most of the traditional clients disappeared. When Uibleisen died in 1928 there was no successor.

In the autumn of 1933, a unit from Hitler's paramilitary Sturmabteilung stationed in the building. Later, when the Von-der-Tann-Strasse street was redeveloped into a main accessway to the Haus der Kunst art museum, the building was used as a provisional canteen for the construction workers. In 1937 the "dragon ornament" was removed, and the building slated for demolition to make way for a planned arcade building which could not be realized during World War II. During the allied bombing campaigns in April 1944, the building became severely damaged. After the war the premises were acquired by the state of Bavaria, who ceded it to the United States for the construction of its new Consulate General of the United States, Munich.

== Works (selection) ==
Significant photographs that emerged from the atelier include:

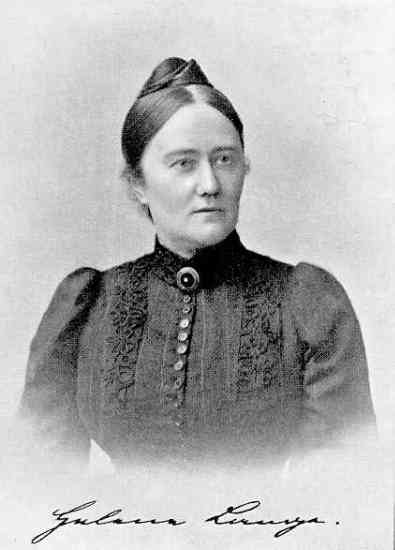
Feminist Helene Lange, before 1899

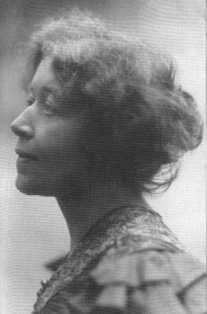
Author and Historian Ricarda Huch, 1901

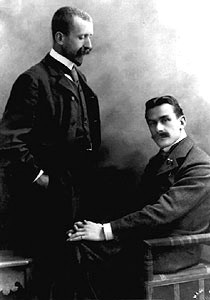
Novelists Heinrich and Thomas Mann,
about 1902

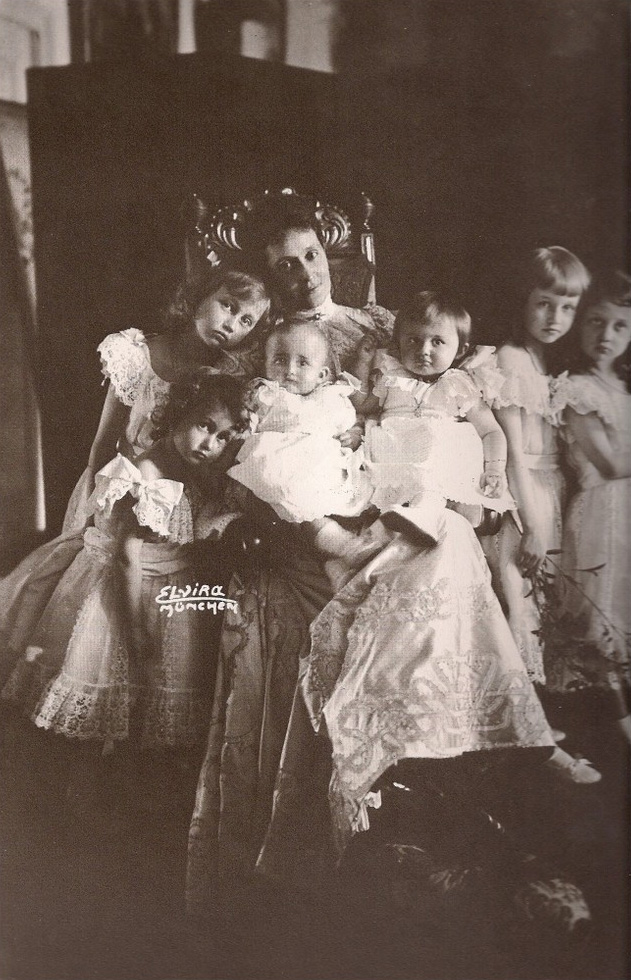
Grand Duchess Regnant of Luxembourg Maria Anna of Portugal, 1903

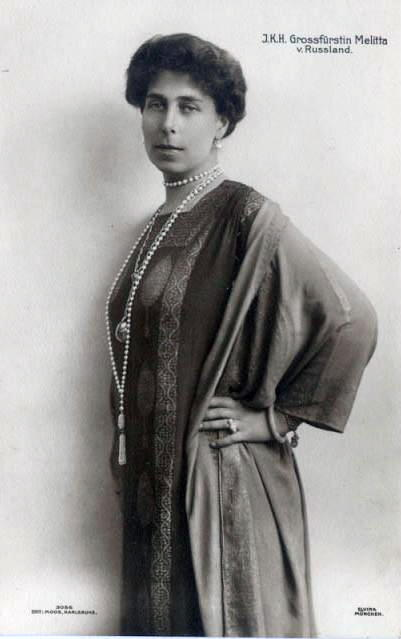
Grand Duchess of Russia Princess Victoria Melita of Saxe-Coburg and Gotha

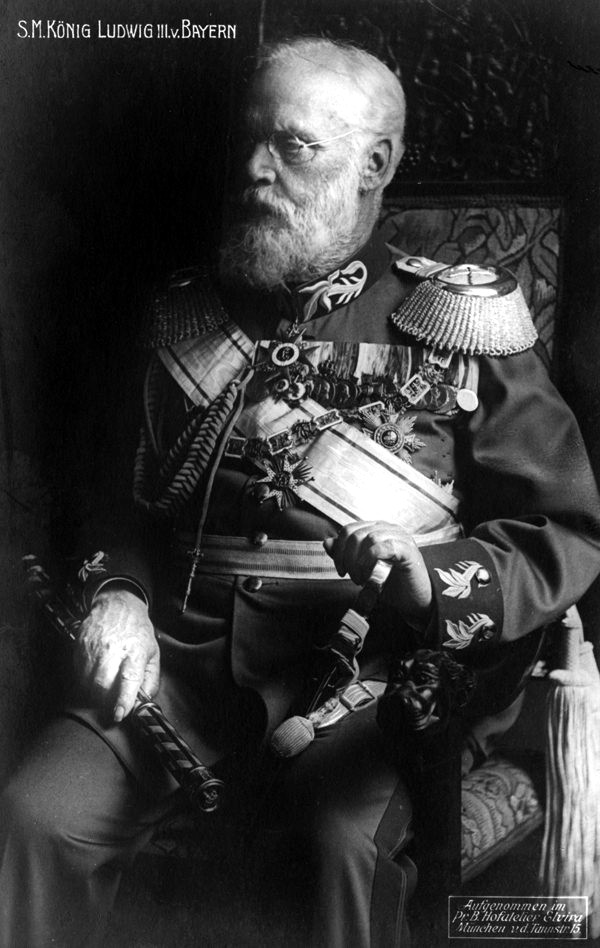
King Ludwig III of Bavaria, 1914

== Bibliography ==
- Ingvild Richardsen (Hrsg.): Die modernen Frauen des Atelier Elvira in München und Augsburg 1887–1908, Volk Verlag, München 2022. ISBN 978-3-86222-417-3
- Hof-Atelier Elvira, München (German), Munich City Museum, 1986
- Hof-Atelier Elvira, München (German), Photo Museum, 1985
- Herz, Rudolf / Bruns, Brigitte: Hof-Atelier Elvira 1887-1928. Ästheten, Emanzen, Aristokraten (German), Munich, 1985.
- August Endell: der Architekt des Photoateliers Elvira. 1871-1925 (German), exhibition catalog Stuck-Jugendstil-Verein, Munich, 1977
