= Verein Frauenwohl =

German women's association

- Formation: 1888
- Founder: Minna Cauer
- Founded at: Berlin
- Region served: Germany
- Services: improving the lives of women
- Main organ: Frauenwohl

Verein Frauenwohl ("Women's Welfare association") was a German women's organisation composed of philanthropic women who worked for improving the social and political conditions of women in society. It was founded by Minna Cauer in Berlin in 1888, who also served as the editor of the association's official organ, called Frauenwohl.

== History ==
Cauer founded the first Frauenwohl organisation in Berlin in 1888 with the aim of encouraging the establishment of associations of the same name in Danzig, Königsberg, Frankfurt (Oder), Breslau, Bonn, Bromberg, Rudolstadt and finally, also in Hamburg. It was focused on advancing the basic demands for equal rights for women in all areas.

The association was established in Hamburg at the end of 1895 and, like four other associations, was based in the women's center founded by Lida Heymann at Paulstraße 9 in Hamburg. Heymann and especially Cauer came to the fore as founders.

Although the scope of the association overlapped with that of the local group of the German Association of Female Citizens, there were major differences in the way it worked and in the political approach. In the Frauenwohl association, there were never cautious "ifs" and "buts"; it was never asked whether something would cause offense to the authorities or in the high society and families of Hamburg. The progressive feminists of Frauenwohl association protested with undisguised opposition against everything that seemed unfair to their views, made criticism at public meetings and in the press; it made its demands and made no compromises.

Their activities included meetings and discussions on current political issues; educational courses on civil rights, the constitution, guardianship and political parties. Further, the association visited prisoners and supported them following their sentences. The association's demands included a uniform association law for all of Germany, employment of female doctors in schools, a total transformation of the prison system, a thorough reform of the schools for girls and more chances for women's employment, especially through new types of jobs of a scientific and commercial nature.

Cauer was also the editor of the association's weekly newsletter, called Frauenwohl.

== Notable members ==
- Minna Cauer (1841-1922), pedagogue, feminist activist, pacifist and journalist
- Hedwig Dohm (1831-1919), feminist and author
- Helene von Forster (1859-1923), women's rights activist and author
- Lida Heymann (1868-1943), feminist, pacifist and women's rights activist
- Bertha Kipfmüller (1861-1948), school teacher, women's rights activist, pacifist
- Jeanette Schwerin (1852-1899), women's rights activist and pioneer of social work

== See also ==
- Feminism in Germany

== Bibliography ==
- Cauer, Minna: 25 Jahre Verein Frauenwohl Groß-Berlin, Loewenthal [Druck], Berlin 1913, online (in German)
- Twellmann, Margit (ed.): Erlebtes, Erschautes: Deutsche Frauen kämpfen für Freiheit, Recht und Frieden; 1850–1940. Lida Gustava Heymann und Anita Augspurg, 1941. Helmer Verlag, Frankfurt a. M. 1992, ISBN 3-927164-43-7 (in German)
