= Sophia Goudstikker =

Dutch photographer (1865–1924)

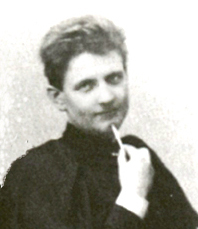
- In 1898 at Atelier Elvira
- Born: 15 January 1865; Rotterdam, Netherlands
- Died: 20 March 1924 (aged 59); Munich, Germany
- Occupations: photographer, women's rights activist
- Years active: 1889–1924
- Known for: first single woman to obtain a royal license for photography

Sophia Goudstikker (15 January 1865 – 20 March 1924) was a Dutch-born German photographer and feminist pioneer. She was one of the premier women's rights activists in Munich at the turn of the century and a business partner and companion of Anita Augspurg. When their partnership dissolved, Goudstikker became a more moderate feminist and partnered with Ika Freudenberg. Goudstikker was the inspiration for three different writers' depictions of a more masculine woman, who defied typical feminine characterizations. She was the first unmarried German woman to obtain a royal license for photography and the first German woman allowed to argue cases before the youth court.

== Early life ==
Sophia Goudstikker was born on 15 January 1865 in Rotterdam, Netherlands to Grietje (née Klisser) and Salomon Elias Goudstikker. In 1867, the family left Rotterdam and settled in Hamburg, Germany. They left thereafter with the youngest children and moved to Dresden, where Salomon died in 1892. Goudstikker attended an art school in Dresden, which was directed by Anita Augspurg′s sister and the two young women met, when Anita came to Dresden for a visit. Augspurg and Goudstikker determined that Munich would be open to a business enterprise run by women and relocated after Augspurg inherited her grandmother's estate.

== Career and feminism ==
Goudstikker and Augspurg arrived in Munich and founded the Hofatelier Elvira in 1887. Goudstikker was the first unmarried German woman to obtain a royal license for photography. The studio became a meeting place for the avant-garde and was frequented by many noted figures. Isadora Duncan, Marie-Adélaïde, Grand Duchess of Luxembourg, Rainer Maria Rilke, and other artists, intellectuals and royalty had their photographs taken there. In 1898 the partnership dissolved and Goudstikker ran the studio alone until 1908. She hired the architect, August Endell to design the studio, at #15 Von-der-Tann-Straße, which became quite noted. The turquoise and violet Art Nouveau façade with a stylized dragon in bas-relief was a recognizable landmark. Goudstikker's younger sister Mathilde Nora, often called Nora, joined her to work as a photographer. Near the end of her life, Goudstikker leased the business to the photographer Emma Uibleisen, but World War I and its aftermath had dispersed the traditional clientele.

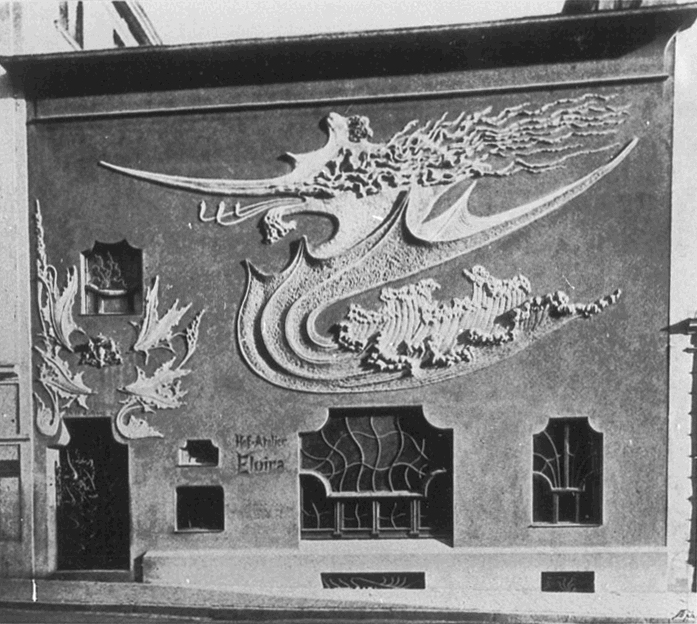
Atelier (Hofatelier) Elvira

As their photography business grew, the two women became staunch feminists. Goudstikker and Augspurg were interested in redefining women's spaces. Goudstikker wore short hair and simple, relaxed clothing and projected what seemed to contemporaries to be a female masculinity. She was the inspiration of characters such as "Hans" in Lou Andreas-Salomé′s Mädchenreign, "she" in Frieda von Bülow′s She and He and "Box" in Ernst von Wolzogen′s novel The Third Sex. Diary entries of Salomé and Bülow confirm that Goudstikker was the muse for all three characters and they gave Goudstikker the nickname "Puck".

In 1889, Goudstikker and Augspurg joined the movement to open university study to women, German Women for Reform, and then the following year, joined the Modern Life Society to advance modernity into social and artistic realms for women. The meetings of both organizations were kept under surveillance by police, who believed that they fostered immorality and breached the ban on women's political involvement. Augspurg was often the speaker, while Goudstikker's job was to convince the authorities that the meetings were not for the purpose of political agitation.

In May, 1894, Goudstikker and Augspurg founded the Society for Women's Interests (German: Verein für Fraueninteressen (VFF)), to broaden the reach of women's organizations to include the socio-economic sphere. Ika Freudenberg was one of the founders of this organization, and though a more moderate feminist, served as its manager from 1896 until her death. When Augspurg and Goudstikker's partnership dissolved, Goudstikker moved toward practical issues of feminism focusing on economic and legal parity. She led the legal protection office of the VFF from its founding in 1898 until her death and was the first German woman permitted to represent youth court cases. In the youth courts, a legal degree or license was not required and while self-taught, Goudstikker's prowess at legal defense earned respect in Munich. When the new studio building was completed, Goudstikker and Freudenberg lived together in the building behind the studio at #3a Königinstraße. In 1898 Goudstikker converted from Judaism to Protestantism.

Goudstikker died in Munich on 20 March 1924.

== Legacy ==
Goudstikker has become a focus of American gender scholars of lesbianism, though has largely been ignored by German scholars. The era was one in which Victorian ideals of womanhood still demanded that a woman's place was within a heterosexual union and in charge of bringing up children and managing the household affairs. Demands for sexual freedom and women's desire was a relatively new concept at the time and not accepted by the majority of women's activists or the public in general. The women in her circle strove to redefine what women's community was. Hofatelier Elvira was widely reported to be an enclave for homosexuality and the growing visibility of same-sex partnerships. From a gender perspective, Goudstikker avoids a strict binary interpretation as her business and intimate relationships were varied. With Augspurg, both strove to embody masculine traits, with Freudenberg the relationship was one in which Freudenberg has been described as a feminine and Goudstikker as a masculine partner, and in her relationships with Bülow and Salomé, there is a shared feminine aspect. In part, the era imbued masculine identity with independence, and Goudstikker's androgyny forced writers to try to restore her femininity or destroy it entirely and masculinize her. A park in Munich Ramersdorf is named after her.
