= Josephine Siebe =

German children's book author (1870–1941)

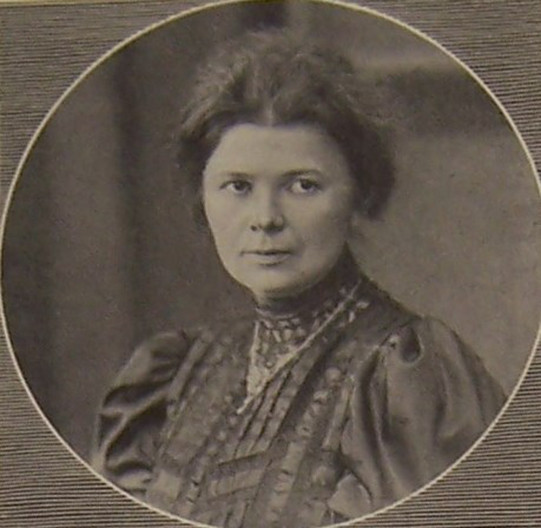
- Josephine Siebe
- Born: November 10, 1870; Leipzig
- Died: July 26, 1941 (aged 70); Leipzig, Germany
- Occupation(s): author of children's and youth literature

Josephine Siebe (November 10, 1870 – July 26, 1941) was a German editor and children's book author.

== Career ==
Between 1900 and 1940, she wrote almost 70 books for children and adolescent girls, as well as a large number of contributions to annual and anthologies.

Some of Josephine Siebe's books have also been translated into other languages, with known editions in Dutch, Spanish, Portuguese, French, English, Polish, Swedish and Finnish. Her books were illustrated by some of the best-known illustrators of the time: Ernst Kutzer, Fritz Bergen, Willy Planck, Joseph Mauder, Carl Schmauk, Prof. Hermann Stockmann, Prof. Wilhelm Claudius, Prof. Ernst Liebermann, Fritz Baumgarten, Else Raydt and others.

== Works ==
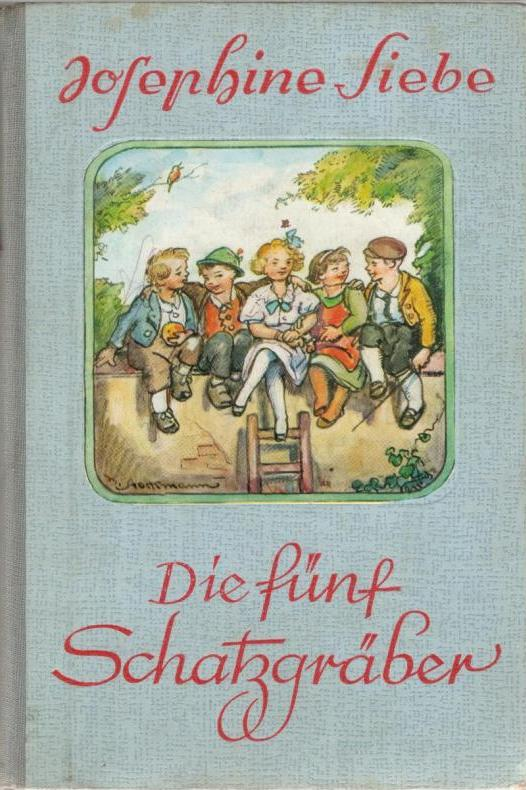
Die fünf Schatzgräber

=== Village and small town stories ===
- Oberheudorfer Buben- und Mädelgeschichten (1908)
- Neue Kindergeschichten aus Oberheudorf (1912)
- Die Oberheudorfer in der Stadt (1914)
- Drei aus Oberheudorf (1932)
- Rose, Linde und Silberner Stern (1917)
- Die Sternbuben in der Großstadt (1918)
- Feriengäste im Silbernen Stern (1920)
- Kleinstadtkinder (1910) {späterer Titel: Die fünf Schatzgräber (1937)}
- Meister Schnupphase und seine Freunde (1915)
- Die Schelme von Steinach (1916)
- Dudeleins Garten und Schippels Kinder (1919)
- Rund um die Rabenburg (1919) {späterer Titel: Die Schloßkinder auf Rabenburg (1927)}
- Im trauten Winkel (1922)
- Die neue Heimat (1924)
- Friedel und die vier Spatzen (1930)
- Die verbannten Prinzessinnen (1930)
- Die fünf Schatzgräber (1937)
- Fritz Immerfroh (1938)
- Maxels sieben Reisen in die weite Welt (1939)

=== Animal and toy stories ===
- Im Hasenwunderland (1910)
- Joli (1913) {späterer Titel: Bimbo (1937)}
- Das {lustige} Puppenbuch (1929)
- Lump und Schlingel (1934)
- Das Teddybuch (1924)
- Sechs Bärenbrüder (1927)

=== Kasperle books ===
- Kasperle auf Reisen (1921)
- Kasperle auf Burg Himmelhoch (1922)
- Kasperls Abenteuer in der Stadt (1923)
- Kasperles Schweizerreise (1925)
- Kasperle im Kasperland (1926)
- Kasperle ist wieder da (1928)
- Kasperles Spiele und Streiche (1930)

=== Girls' books ===
- Die Tasse des Königs (1916)
- Die goldene Brücke (1918)
- Die Nichten des Herrn von Trentlin (1919)
- Als noch die Postkutsche fuhr (1921)
- Am Höhenweg (1921) [späterer Titel: Ellen und die lustige Ursel (1932)]
- Im trauten Winkel (1922)
- Im hellen Tal (1923)
- Lene Kellermann (1925)
- Die Dietrichskinder und andere Erzählungen (1926)
- Liebesfeuer (1926)
- Anna Sabine und ihre Schwestern (1929)
- Das Wetterhexlein (1929)
- Frohe Mädel und ihre Kameraden (1930)
- Das Haus im Walde (1931)
- Lustige Feriengeschichten (1933)

=== Historical novels ===
- Deutsche Jugend in schwerer Zeit (1904)
- Heimatsucher (1911)
- Das Ruhmesbüchlein (1913)
- Die Steinbergs (1913) [späterer Titel: Die Jungen von Steinberg (1933)]
- Deutsches Herz im welschen [fremden] Kleid (1915)
- Herrn de Charreards deutsche Kinder (1922) [späterer Titel: Heimat im stillen Tal (1934)]
- Die kleine Mamsell Pfefferkraut (1923)
