= Höhere Mädchenschule =

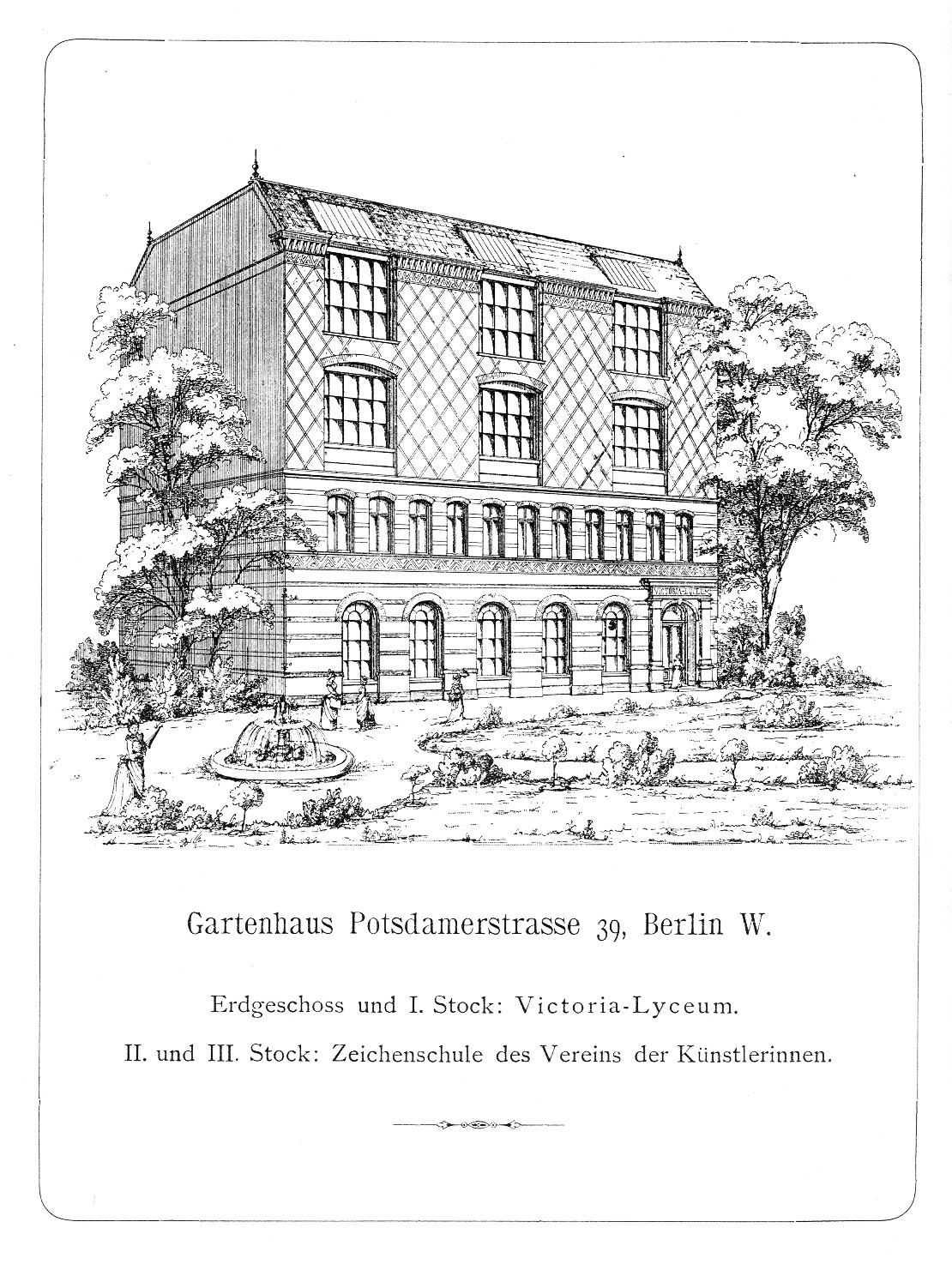
Victoria-Lyceum in Berlin, 1893

Höhere Mädchenschule or Höhere Töchterschule were names of historic schools for the higher education of girls in German-speaking countries between the beginning of the 19th century and 1908. The names may mean higher education, but also education of girls (or daughters) of the upper classes. Some early institutions of higher education for girls were called Lyceum, while the term Gymnasium was first used only for boys' schools.

== History ==
The term Höhere Mädchenschule was used for schools which promoted education of the mind ("geistige Bildung") beyond Volksschule (elementary school). They were sometimes reserved for höhere Töchter (literally: "higher daughters"), girls from the wealthy bourgeoisie. The Mariengymnasium in Papenburg, for example, was founded around 1835 for the female youth from upper estates ("die weibliche Jugend höherer Stände").

The first schools providing higher education for girls were founded at the beginning of the 18th century. The Gymnaecum, founded in 1709 by August Hermann Francke, is regarded as the first such institution. In 1717, Catholic "Englische Fräulein" of the Congregation of Jesus founded institutions for girls in Bamberg. In 1802, the first municipal school for girls was founded in Hanover, the "Städtische höhere Töchterschule". One of its teachers, Johann Heinrich Meier, founded in 1806 a private institution for girls in Lübeck, which existed until 1871. In 1808, "Madame Wippermann", the wife of a merchant and manufacturer in Quedlinburg, founded the first private Höhere Töchterschule for 40 students, which expanded to the Städtische Höhere Töchterschule in 1863 and to today's Neustädter Grundschule Quedlinburg.

Education at these schools aimed primarily to prepare the girls to become wives and mothers. For more scientific education, wealthy families sent their girls to a finishing school (Mädchenpensionat). Many girls from poor families left school as soon as compulsory education was served, to fulfil other duties. At the end of the 19th century, Prussia had 213 public höhere Mädchenschulen and 656 private ones.

The höhere Mädchenschulen had no Gymnasiale Oberstufe leading to the Abitur, a prerequisite for university studies. Girls, who usually left them aged 15 or 16, could only study at seminaries to be teachers ("Lehrerinnenseminar"). In the 1890s, the first high schools for girls (Mädchengymnasium) were founded, which enabled girls to study.

Helene Lange achieved in 1908, in collaboration with the responsible Prussian cultural politician Friedrich Althoff and other reformers, that schools for girls were fundamentally restructured.

== Literature ==
- Helene Lange: Die höhere Mädchenschule und ihre Bestimmung. 1887.
