= Marie Loeper-Housselle =

German educator and advocate for the education of girls and women

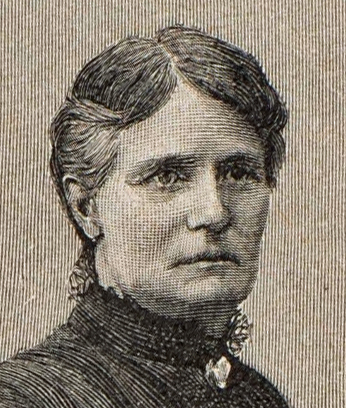
- Born: 11 February 1837; Gross-Lesewitz, West Prussia
- Died: 25 January 1916 (aged 78); Baden-Baden, Germany
- Occupations: Educator, Suffragist

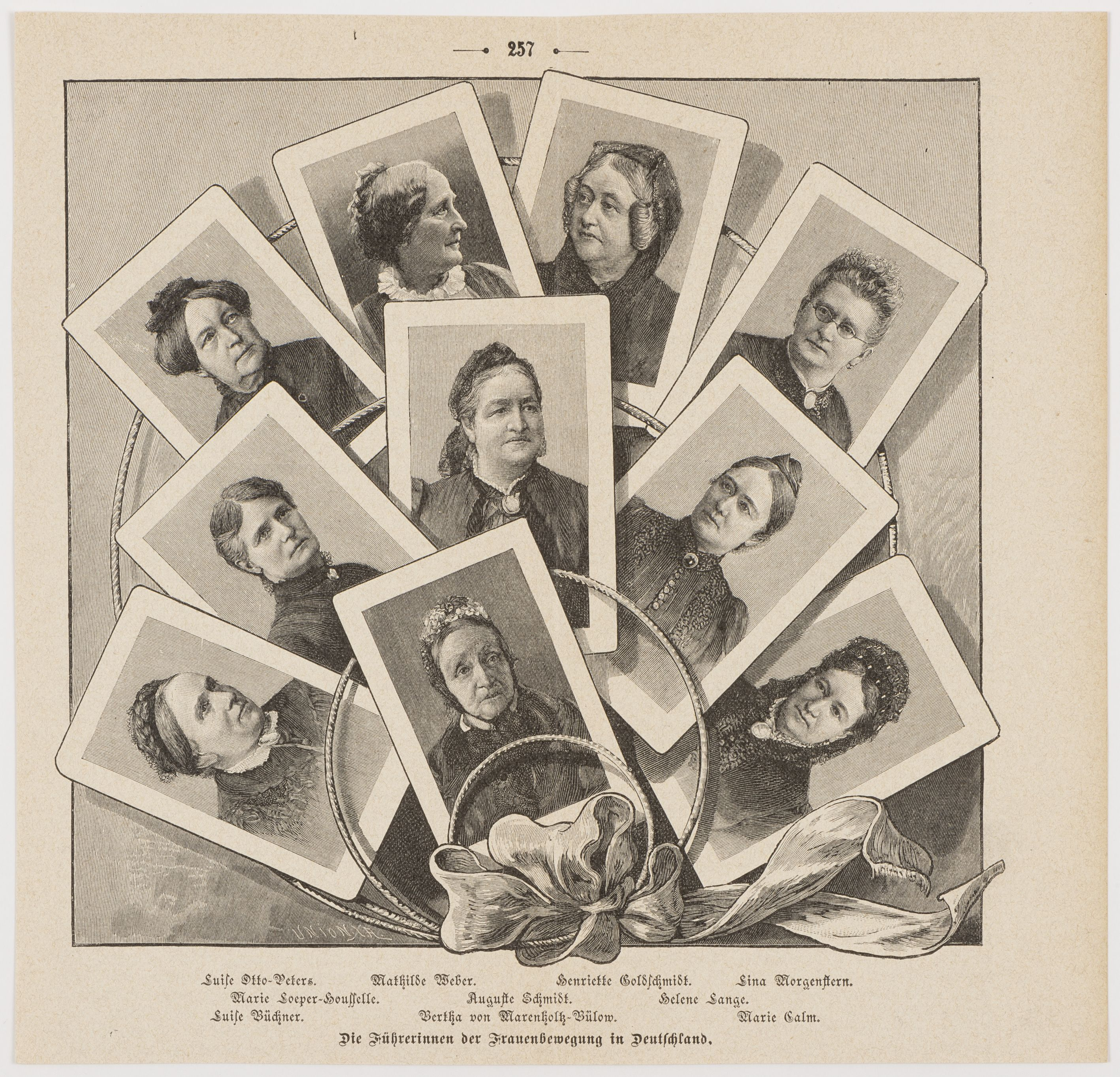
Führerinnen der Frauenbewegung in Deutschland 1894

Marie Loeper-Housselle (1837-1916) was a German educator and advocate for the education of girls and women. She founded the trade journal for teachers Die Lehrerin in Schule und Haus.

== Life ==
Loeper-Housselle was born on 11 February 1837 in Gross-Lesewitz, West Prussia.

Loeper-Housselle began her career as an educator in Elbląg where she finish her apprenticeship. After her marriage, she moved to Strasbourg, Alsace and there she became interested in organizing teachers and also improving education for girls.

She founded the first German teacher's professional journal, Die Lehrerin in Schule und Haus (The teacher in school and house) and the organization Allgemeine deutsche Lehrerinnen-Verein (General German teachers association).

Loeper-Housselle died on 25 January 1916 in Baden-Baden, Germany.

== See also ==
- List of suffragists and suffragettes
