= German Association of Female Citizens =

The German Association of Female Citizens (German: Deutscher Staatsbürgerinnen-Verband) is the oldest German women's rights organisation, founded on 18 October 1865.

== History ==
The association was created by Louise Otto-Peters and Auguste Schmidt in Leipzig on 18 October 1865. The first SPD chairman August Bebel was also present when the association was founded. It was originally named the General German Women's Association (German: Allgemeiner Deutscher Frauenverein).

One example of their early work was when Maria von Linden was refused full entry as a student to University of Tübingen. She was allowed by a vote of 8 to 10 to be allowed as a guest student. Her studies were financed and supported by this association. Linden would become one of Germany's first female professors.

The association adopted its current name in 1918. The German Association of Female Citizens is affiliated with the International Alliance of Women.

== See also ==
- Frauenwohl
