= Marie Stritt =

German feminist (1855–1928)

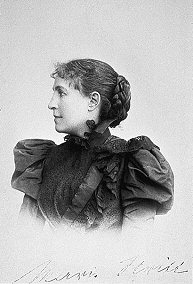
- Born: 18 February 1855; Segesvár, Kingdom of Hungary (today Sighișoara, Romania)
- Died: 16 September 1928 (aged 73); Dresden, Germany
- Occupations: Actor, suffragist
- Spouse: Albert Stritt (m. 1879; died in 1908)

Marie Stritt (18 February 1855 – 16 December 1928) was a German feminist and a leading force in the international and German women's suffrage movement. She helped work towards woman's education and fought against state regulated prostitution. Stritt also worked for changes regarding divorce laws through the Woman's Legal Aid Society. She was a strong proponent of birth control and abortion.

== Life ==
Stritt née Bacon was born on 18 February 1855 in Segesvár, Kingdom of Hungary (today Sighișoara, Romania). She had a career as an actress at the Badisches Staatstheater Karlsruhe. In 1879 she married fellow actor and opera singer Albert Stritt (1847–1908).

Stritt began her work in the late 1890s. She was an activist for many groups, including the women's group reform (1891) and the Women's Legal Aid Society (1894), organizations dedicated to fighting for women's rights to education equality and legal protection. Stritt proved an important leader in the International Woman Suffrage Alliance (IWSA), whose goal was to work towards women's education and to oppose state-regulated prostitution.

Marie Stritt was one of the founders of the International Alliance of Women 1904 in Berlin, Germany. She was the chairperson of Bund Deutscher Frauenvereine from 1899 to 1910, the Deutscher Verband für Frauenstimmrecht from 1913 to 1919, and the International Alliance of Women from 1913 to 1920.

Stritt's activism did not end with her retirement from the board of the International Woman Suffrage Alliance; she continued to write and participate in journalism fighting for feminism issues for the remainder of her life.

Stritt died on 16 September 1928 in Dresden, Germany.

== Literature ==
- Häusliche Knabenerziehung, Berlin 1891
- Frauenlogik, Dresden 1892
- Die Frau gehört ins Haus, Dresden 1893
- Die Bestimmung des Mannes, Dresden 1894
- Weibl. Schwächen, Dresden 1894
- Der Internationale Frauenkongress in Berlin 1904
