= Helene Lange =

German women's rights activist

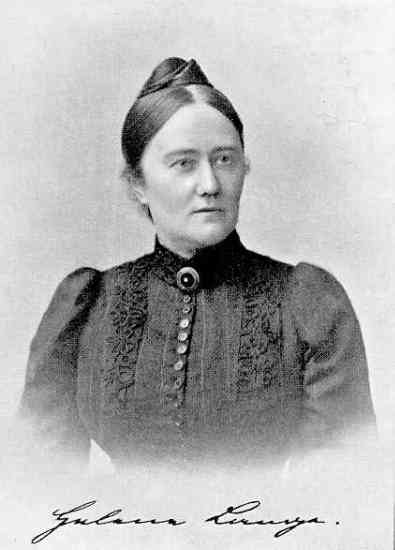
Helene Lange, portrait photo by Hofatelier Elvira.

Helene Lange (1848–1930) was a leading voice for German women's access to higher education and professional careers, particularly in teaching. She helped encourage the establishment of the Frauenbewegung, or women's movement, in Germany, and her life's work was to raise the standards of education among women. She believed that social progress was impossible without equal educational opportunities being given to women.

== Early life and education ==
Helen Lange was born in 1848 in Oldenburg. Through her determination, she rose above the trials of her early life, including the loss of her parents, to become a leading voice for women's access to higher education and professional careers, particularly in teaching. She helped motivate the establishment of the Frauenbewegung, or women's movement, in Germany. She worked to raise the standards of education among women, believing that social progress was impossible without equal educational opportunities being given to women.

In addition to her work as an educator, Lange was also active in politics and social reform. In 1890, she founded the Allgemeiner Deutscher Lehrerinnenverein a general association of German female teachers, which was a network that fought for women educators to improve their working conditions and have more access to leading positions in the field. The work of Lange was an important contribution to the role of women in public life and encouraged later generations of women to become leaders. She was an important figure in the history of the international women's movement due to her commitment to equal education.

When she was young, Helene Lange and her pursuits for gaining a higher education experienced challenges: German universities were practically closed to women. This did not turn her away from her goals, however. Lange proceeded with self-education and afterward she became a private tutor and then a teacher in Berlin. The limited opportunities she had created more determination, and she became set on taking down the restrictive norms which kept women out of academia and professional fields.

== Women's education reform ==
In 1887, women's opportunities changed when Lange wrote the Yellow Brochure, which was the memorandum that she submitted to the Prussian Ministry of Education. This became a powerful document that stated that reform within girls' education needed more intensive academic curricula and female teachers who were professionally trained. Many were supportive of the Yellow Brochure and gradually it created reforms in the introduction of a secondary education system for women. In the following years, Lange proceeded to publish other works advocating systematic educational reform for girls and women.

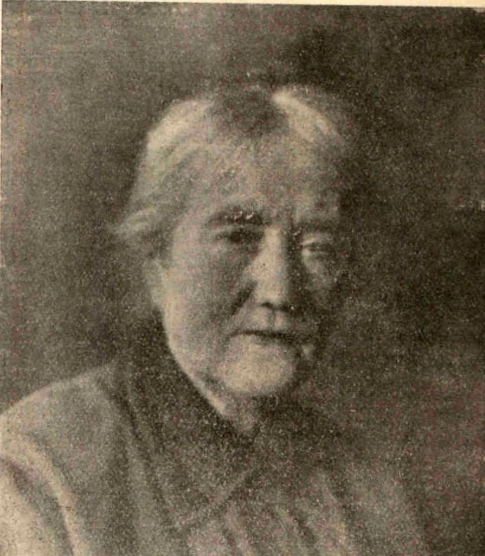
Image of Lange published in Modern Review, May 1927

Helene Lange was also influential in the field of teacher training. She founded and managed the Höhere Mädchenschule, a secondary school to train young women to become teachers. For those times, her method of training teachers was very modern. She emphasized pedagogical theory and thinking combined with a broad-based curriculum. She insisted that women educators receive as much rigorous academic training as was expected of their male peers so that the quality of education for girls would be lifted. Her work helped to professionalize women in education through slow and sure steps, gave them new career opportunities, and supported a model of academic excellence for girls' schools.

== Political engagement and feminist movement ==
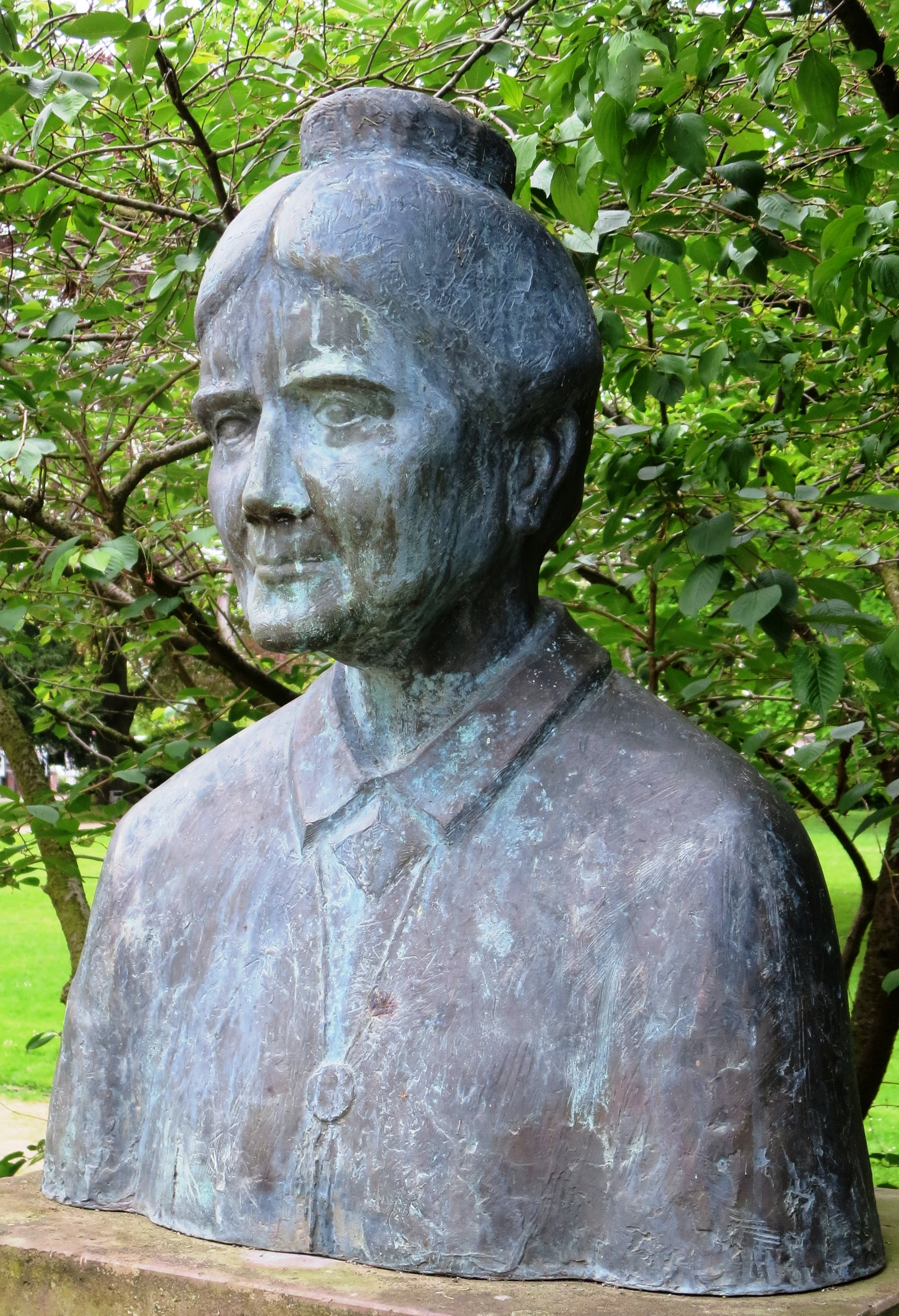
Bust by sculptor Udo Reimann (1995) at the Cäcilienplatz in Oldenburg

Lange's concern for political change also led her to join as one of the founding members the Bund Deutscher Frauenvereine, or Federation of German Women's Associations. As an umbrella organization, this brought together various local groups of women whose common goals were political rights and social reform. Through the work of the federation, Lange also wanted to advance the rights of women beyond education. These rights included suffrage and equality in work. While she was more moderate compared to some of her contemporaries, Lange approached things in such a strategic way that she chose gradual change to get broader acceptance of her ideas within German society. The role in the women's movement would change for Lange, especially in the politically turbulent Weimar Republic. While many other feminists began to push for faster, more radical changes, Lange urged more moderate reform. Her rationality sometimes set her at odds with the other women but emphasized her belief in lasting change. Her contribution to education and the general feminist movement is nonetheless fundamental, as she worked diligently for the creation of a society that would make it possible for future generations of women to have more empowered roles in society.

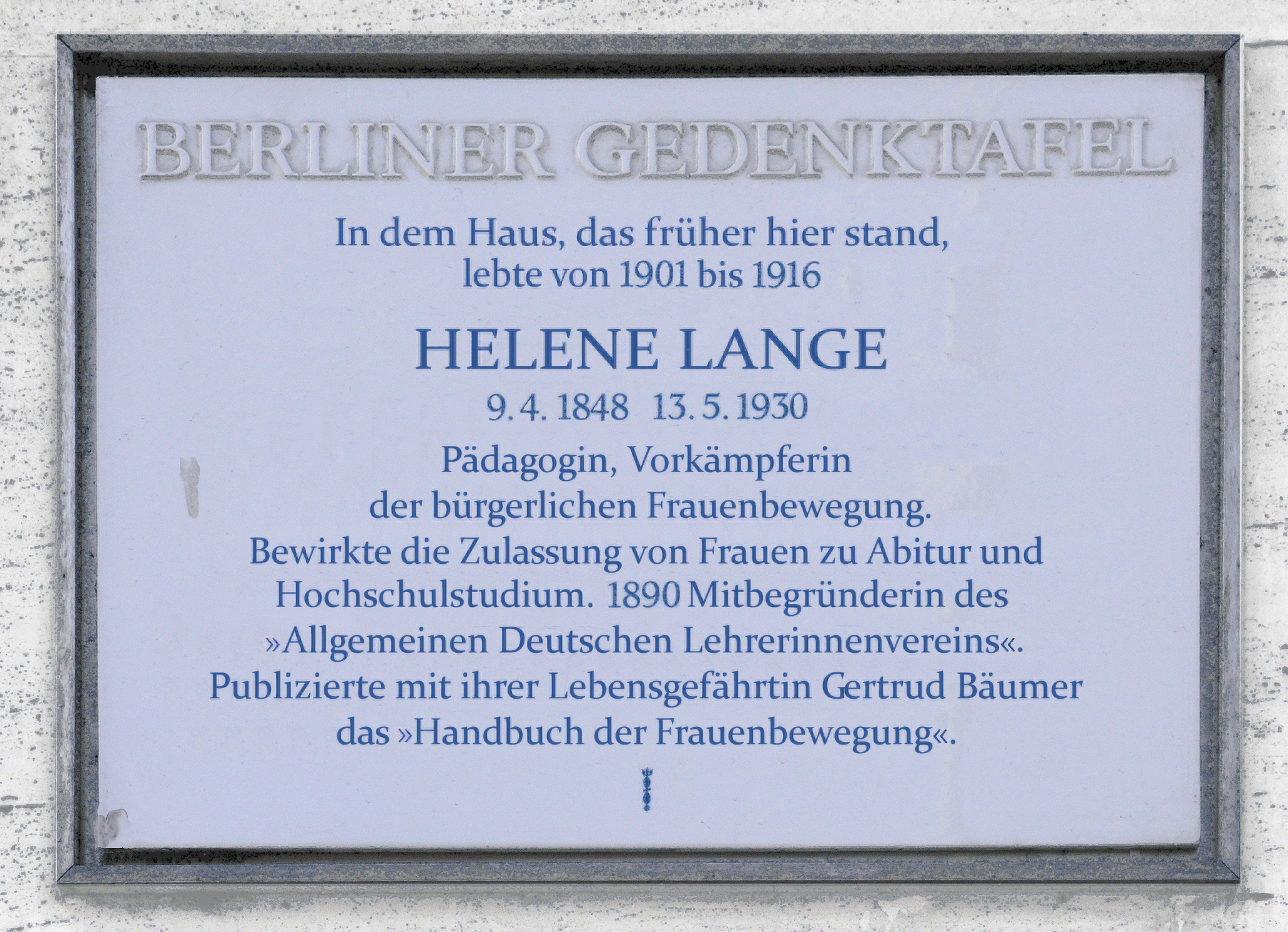
Porcelain Berlin Memorial Plaque on the house at Kunz-Buntschuh-Straße 7 in Grunewald

== Later life ==
In 1919, she was elected to the Hamburg Parliament on behalf of the German Democratic Party. In 1928, she was awarded the Grand Prussian State Medal. She also received an honorary doctorate in political science from the University of Tübingen.

Her work gained international recognition, and she stayed in contact with the various feminist movements throughout Europe and the United States as part of a network of international women's rights advocates. She spent her last years in Hamburg, where she continued with her writing on women's rights until she died in 1930.
