= Glückel of Hameln =

German-Jewish writer and businesswoman

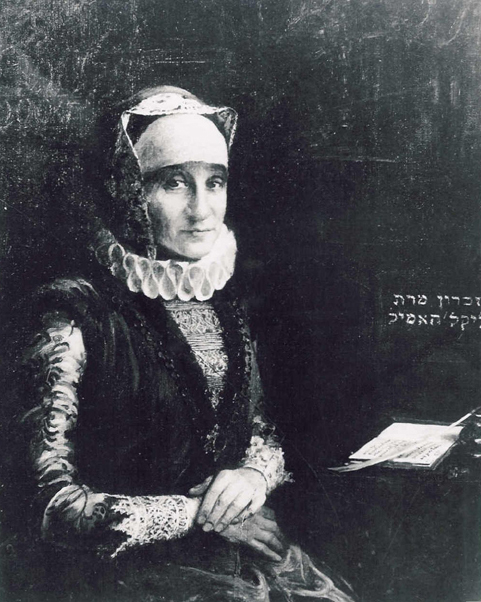
- A fancy portrait of Bertha Pappenheim wearing 17th-century costume in the persona of Glückel, painted by Leopold Pilichowski.
- Born: Glikl bas Judah Leib c. 1646; Hamburg, Danish monarchy
- Died: September 19, 1724 (aged 77–78); Metz, Three Bishoprics, France
- Other names: Glikl bas Judah Leib; Glikl of Hameln; Glückel von Hameln; Glückel Pinkerle
- Occupation: Businesswoman
- Years active: 1689–1719
- Known for: Memoirs
- Spouses: Hayyim Segal of Hameln (m. 1660; died 1689); Cerf Levy (m. 1700; died 1712)
- Parents: Judah Joseph Leib (father); Beila bat Nathan Melrich (mother)

Glückel of Hameln (Yiddish: גליקל בת ר׳ יהודה לייב האַמיל Glikl bas Reb Yehude Leyb Hamil; also spelled Glückel, Glüeckel, Glickl Hamel or Glikl of Hamelin; also known as Glikl bas Judah Leib) (c. 1646 – September 19, 1724) was a German Jewish businesswoman and diarist. Written in her native tongue of Western Yiddish over the course of thirty years, her memoirs were originally intended to be an ethical will for her children and future descendants. Glückel's diaries are the only known pre-modern Yiddish memoirs written by a woman. The Memoirs of Glückel of Hameln provide an intimate portrait of German-Jewish life between the late seventeenth and early eighteenth centuries and have become an important source for historians, philologists, sociologists, literary critics, and linguists.

== Background ==
=== Naming conventions ===
Glückel was a popular name in the Middle Ages. The name “Glückel” is diminutive of "Glück," the German translation of the Hebrew name “Mazal,” meaning “good fortune.” Mazal was exclusively used by Sephardic Jews, while Ashkenazi Jews used either the German variations of "Glück" and "Glueck" or the Yiddish version "Glick." The ending "el" is a diminutive which indicates "little" or "little one" and was used in the Yiddish and German variations of Glückel, Glukel, Glukil, Glickel, and Glikel. The pseudo-aristocratic variation "Glückel von Hameln" was used by the editor of the memoir's first publication in Yiddish.

Despite being referred to by many different variations, her preferred name would have most likely have been "Glikl bas Judah Leib," meaning "Glikl daughter of Judah Leib," in keeping with Jewish naming traditions of her time.

== Life and death ==
Glückel was born into a wealthy family in the city of Hamburg in 1646 or 1647, one of six children born to Judah Joseph Leib and his second wife Beila. She had one brother, Wolf, and four sisters: Rebekah, Elkel, Hendele, and Mate. Her father was a successful diamond trader and parnas, a leader in the Jewish community; her mother was also involved in business. In 1649, when Glückel was less than three years old, her family and the rest of Hamburg's Ashkenazic Jewish community was expelled to Altona. Her father had been so respected in Hamburg that he was the first German Jew permitted to return. Glückel's father ensured that all of his children were both pious and well-educated, including his daughters. Although she was unable to study the Torah, Glückel received a formal education in a Cheder, the traditional Jewish primary school, where she learned Hebrew and the basics of Judaism.

When she was twelve years old, Glückel was betrothed to Hayyim of Hameln, whom she married in 1660 at the age of fourteen. After the marriage, the couple lived in the groom's parents’ home in Hameln. A year after their marriage, the couple moved in with Glückel's parents in Hamburg, where Hayyim began dealing in gold and became an affluent businessman. A year after that, they became parents for the first time. Glückel assisted her husband in trading seed pearls, eventually taking over the family business when he died in 1689. She was one of few women who traveled by themselves to conduct trade at European markets and fairs. In addition to her business dealings, Glückel also maintained an extremely active social life which often required extensive travel. Her memoirs tell of travels to cities as varied as Amsterdam, Bamberg, Danzig, Hanover, Hildesheim, Copenhagen, Frankfurt, Leipzig, Berlin, Vienna, Metz, and Paris.

Glückel and Hayyim had a total of fourteen children, one of whom died as a 2-week old infant, another of whom died as a three-year old. The names of the 13 children to live beyond infancy are as follows: Zipporah (c. 1661), Nathan (c. 1663), Mata (c. 1666), Mordechai (c. 1670), Hannah (c. 1672), Loeb (c. 1673), Esther (c. 1677), Joseph (c. 1677), Hendelchen (c. 1678), Samuel (c. 1680), Freudchen (c. 1684), Moses (c. 1685), and Miriam (c. 1686). Glückel took great pride in the fact that many of her children were married into some of the most prominent Jewish families of Europe.

In 1700, eleven years after Hayyim's death, Glückel remarried. Although she had rejected a number of proposals, she finally acquiesced as she believed that remarrying would ultimately benefit her children by protecting their future. Her second husband was Cerf Levy, a successful banker and parnas from Metz. Two years after their marriage, Levy failed financially, losing not only his own fortune but hers as well. Still deep in the throes of bankruptcy, Levy died in 1712, leaving Glückel a widow for the second time. Ever fearful of becoming a burden to her children, Glückel lived alone until falling too ill to care for herself in 1715. At the age of seventy, after much pleading from her children, she moved in with her daughter Esther and her son-in-law Moses.

Glückel died from natural causes on September 19, 1724, in Metz.

== The Memoirs of Glückel of Hameln ==
=== History of the memoirs ===
In 1691, two years after the death of her beloved husband, Glückel began writing her memoirs in an attempt to comfort herself during her immense grief. At the time she was a 46-year-old widow with twelve children, eight of whom remained unmarried. She initially stopped writing the diaries in 1699, shortly before her second marriage to Cerf Levy, but resumed in 1715 while she was living with her daughter following her second husband's death. Glückel completed the seventh and final book in 1719.

Glückel was born two years before the end of the Thirty Years' War. She lived through, and subsequently wrote about, many other notable historical events, including but not limited to Charles X Gustav of Sweden's war on Denmark, the Khmelnytsky Uprising of 1648, the expulsion of the Jewish population of Hamburg to Altona, the scandal of the "Messianic pretender" Sabbatai Zevi, the Franco-Dutch War, and the War of the Spanish Succession. Glückel's stories reveal much about the often frightening and precarious situation under which the Jews of northern Germany lived during the late sixteenth and early seventeenth centuries.

Glückel's diaries, a rare account of an ordinary woman, offer a glimpse into the day-to-day life of Jewish inhabitants in northern Germany during the 17th century. The diaries are the sole pre-modern diary written by a woman in Yiddish. Glückel tells of how she guided the financial and personal destinies of her children through marriage arrangements, engaged in business travel and trade, and generally spent her life promoting the welfare of her large family. Glückel wrote extensively about both her own and her first husband's families because she wanted her children to be aware of their lineage. She was explicit that the works were to be preserved for future generations, fearing that her children's children or grandchildren would one day know nothing of their family history.

The memoirs amalgamate several Jewish literary traditions: the Tsava'ah, or ethical will; the tkhines, or women's prayer books; Musar literature, or books of moral instruction; the Mayse bukh, or Yiddish storybook; and the "Family Scroll."

=== Book One ===
The opening pages of Glückel's book include details of her reasons for writing, as well as the underlying beliefs that will come to define her entire narrative. She explains that she began writing her memoirs following the death of her husband of nearly thirty years, Hayyim of Hameln. She explicitly states that she does not wish to write a book of morals for her children to follow; she believes that the Torah provides all of the necessary instructions and thus should be studied diligently. She also states that she intends to complete the memoirs as a series of "seven little books."

Book One provides much of the backstory of Glückel's life. In this book, Glückel tells of her childhood in Hamburg. Though the second chapter begins with her birth, there is almost no reference to her childhood and upbringing except to mention that her father ensured that all of his children, male and female, received both secular and religious education. She mentions that her mother worked making gold and silver lace. Glückel recalls experiences of anti-semitism and how her community was severely impacted by the expulsion of Jews to Altona around 1650. Glückel illustrates her family's importance in the community by noting that her father was the first German Jew allowed to resettle in Hamburg. She has memories of the so-called "Swedish Winter" when the Swedes went to war with the King of Denmark, a monarch who she remembered as great man and friend to the Jews. Glückel also tells of the devastating effect that the plague had on Hamburg's Jewish community, including the death of her grandmother.

Glückel reveals that her father had been a widower when he married her mother. She remembers the circumstances of her sister Hendele's engagement to the son of Reb Gumpel of Cleves, in which Hendele received 1,800 Reichsthalers as her dowry, the most anyone had ever been dowered in Hamburg. Glückel recalls that the match been the most important in all of Germany and that "the whole world admired its excellence and the size of the dowry."

=== Book Two ===
Book Two is one of the shortest of the seven books, and it is also the most joyful. This book begins with Glückel's betrothal to Hayyim of Hameln at age twelve and their marriage two years later; the relationship was arranged by her father. After Glückel and Hayyim were married in Hameln, they moved in with his parents where she was "alone with strangers in a strange world." She recalls her first impressions of Hameln being "a dull shabby hole" and "back-country town where lived only two Jews." She was ultimately not discouraged by her new surroundings, however, because of how well she was treated by her in-laws, especially her father-in-law, Joseph Hameln.

She spends most of the second book giving details about Hayyim's family. She tells the story of Hayyim's eldest brother, Moses, who was shot and killed while being robbed on the way to his own wedding. Joseph's second son, Abraham, was a brilliant Talmud scholar who faced many hardships in his life, including difficulties conceiving without what was rumored to be mystical intervention. Hayyim had a sister named Yenta, who experienced great personal turmoil after marrying the son of the wealthy Sussmann Gans of Minden-on-the-Weser. The fourth child of the family, Samuel, studied in Poland and married the daughter of the prominent Rabbi Sholem of Lemberg. Glückel never met the fifth child, Isaac, who died at age fifty in Frankfort-on-the-Main. Glückel writes very little about Hayyim's sister Esther, stating instead that "all the world knows the excellent woman she was." The seventh child, Loeb, lived in Bonn. He died young "but in riches and honor." Hannah was the eighth child who, like Loeb, also died very young; she, however, was without any wealth. Hayyim was the ninth child, referred to in this book as "your faithful father." He is not discussed at length in the chapter, however, as Glückel advises that the details will be found in the coming pages instead.

=== Book Three ===
Signs of Glückel's business acumen begin to appear in Book Three. She reveals that her husband took business and financial advice from her and no one else, stating that he did nothing in business without her knowledge. Glückel mentions that she drafted a business contract when her husband took ill on a trading trip to Leipzig, a prime example of her husband's utmost confidence in her business capabilities. Hayyim's illness in Leipzig was particularly stressful for Glückel because of the well-known danger that the city posed to Jews. Although Jews were allowed to do business at the Leipzig Fair due to the high taxes they paid, they had not been allowed to live in Saxony since 1537. Glückel knew that if Hayyim had died in Leipzig, it would have been difficult to recover his body for a proper Jewish burial and that all of his possessions would be forfeited, resulting in major personal as well as financial damages.

In this book, Glückel tells of the commotion caused by the false prophet Sabbatai Zevi and how it impacted her family. As the plague continues, Glückel explains of the difficulty of conducting trade and receiving mail, as well as the strange illness and remarkable recovery of her daughter Zipporah, to whom she refers as the "Virgin of Peinholz." Over the course of Book Three, Glückel gives birth to two more daughters, Mata and Hannah. Unfortunately, at age three, Mata contracted a mysterious and painful illness which made her hands and feet swell; she died four weeks later.

=== Book Four ===
Glückel has another child in this volume, a son named Mordecai. Glückel gives more insight into her social and economic status by mentioning that she employs a servant named "Elegant Sam," who had been a replacement for a "Clumsy Sam." Zipporah follows in her mother's footsteps and is also engaged at age twelve, and the townspeople place bets on her marriage. Glückel tells of her embarrassment when, during the marriage ceremony, it was discovered that the ketubah, or Jewish marriage contract, had not been written; although the wedding proceeded without the official contract, this went against custom and Glückel feared that the community would react negatively. Zipporah's wedding is the first of many which are described at length in the memoirs. Glückel mentions the attendance of nobility as well as the performance of the "Dance of Death." Glückel suffers the loss of her beloved sister Hendel, who is buried in Emmerich. She mentions the dangers of sailing from Wangerooge to Hamburg due to pirates. By this time, her son Nathan is fifteen and becomes involved in the family business. Glückel and Hayyim have another daughter, Esther.

Glückel details many economic woes, including the loss of 11,000 Reichsthalers in one year. In a stroke of bittersweet luck, Glückel's father dies after suffering from gout and she gives birth to her son, Loeb, after sitting shiva. Glückel details the distribution of her father's will, which left 1,600 Reichsthalers to her mother and about 1,400 Reichsthalers to each of his children; although Glückel's husband and brother-in-law were entitled to a claim of half the share of a son, they insisted that the money be given to Glückel's mother and her children only. Glückel details the excellent treatment of her mother by her sons-in-law after she became a widow. Glückel notes that her mother's age at widowhood was forty-four and remarks on the fact that she never remarried. Glückel also mentions the existence of other female-authored wills, indicating that her memoirs were not an anomaly for the time.

She gives her impressions of the war between the King of France, Holland, and the Emperor. Hayyim again falls ill on a business trip, this time in Halberstadt. Glückel's father-in-law had died three years before she began writing the fourth book, and she tells a story about her daughter Hannah's experience with a ghostly presence the night before he died. She writes of her husband's experience with shneim asar chodesh, the twelve-month period of mourning for one's parent. Her mother-in-law died two years later at age eighty-two and was buried next to her husband. Glückel celebrates her daughter Esther and son Nathan both becoming engaged, but she also mourns losing an unnamed child in infancy. She describes her experience of giving birth every two years, a period which had begun with her daughter Hendele; two sons, Samuel and Moses, and two daughters, Freudchen and Miriam, followed. The book ends with the death of Hayyim, the "crown of [her] head," in 1689. She laments being left with eight unmarried children and mentions that the four married children also still need help.

=== Book Five ===
Book Five deals extensively with the sickness and eventual death of Hayyim. On January 11, 1689, he fell on a sharp stone, agitating his already long-suffering and "badly twisted bowels." Hayyim initially refused to call for a doctor for want of privacy, but he eventually calls for Abraham Lopez, a physician and "chirurgeon-barber." Glückel offers her body to console or comfort her dying husband, but he refuses her because she is "unclean" due to menstruation and had not visited the mikveh. Hayyim dies on Shabbat while reciting the first lines of the prayer Shema Yisrael: "Hear O'Israel, the Lord our God, the Lord is One!" He is buried January 16, 1689, after which the customary week of mourning commenced. Glückel describes her grief in great detail and also reveals that she felt that she was forgotten by the community after the mourning period ended.

Hayyim died 20,000 Reichsthalers in debt, but Glückel's business acumen ensured that the debts were completely cleared within a year. Life gradually returns to normal as Glückel officially takes over control of the business and family. She describes difficulty with her son Loeb's marriage plans as well as business decisions. After Loeb falls deep into debt after going into business for himself in Berlin, she begins to see the city as cursed. This feeling deepens after her daughter Hendele falls sick and dies there, only seventeen weeks after she got married. She describes how a trusted Talmud teacher misled her son Joseph at the age of fourteen. Glückel recalls the murders of Abraham Metz and Aaron ben Moses, a story which illustrates the complicated relationships that existed between Jews and Gentiles in Hamburg.

=== Book Six ===
Book Six opens with a sense of deep regret. Glückel describes her second marriage as the "change in life [she] sought to avoid." She interprets her second marriage as a punishment for her sins, especially for not committing herself to God after Hayyim's death. She tells of her secret betrothal to Cerf Levy, a widower from Metz, which occurred in June 1699. She relates the story of King Jedijah from Araby to illustrate how even good intentions, such as her desire to protect her children by remarrying, can sometimes go terribly wrong.

Although Glückel agrees to the marriage with the assurance that her new husband was a wise businessman who would offer her "nothing but abundance," she recalls her extreme hesitation. She details difficulties with both her new step-children and the Levy family's staff which included two manservants, two maids, and "numerous lackeys." Glückel describes how distraught she was after she learned her troubled son Loeb had died, expressing her grief with the story of King David and his son Absalom. Glückel ends Book Six by expressing her fears for her family with a desperate plea for God's forgiveness: "May the Almighty God spare us and Israel from further evil, and in His great mercy and grace forgive us sinners all our debts, and lead us back to the Holy Land, that our eyes may see the rebuilding of Thy holy house and our glory restored!"

=== Book Seven ===
According to Glückel, the final book "contains both pleasures and pains, as does the world itself." In this book, both her son Samuel and her second husband die. Samuel dies less than two years after the move to Metz and leaves behind a pregnant widow. After twelve years of marriage, Cerf dies on July 24, 1712. Glückel was unable to recover even her initial dowry because his business was in such a state of ruin at the time of his death. She recalls the dissatisfaction of living in the home of Jacob Marburg, an otherwise unidentified Metz resident who provided her with a room which featured "neither hearth nor chimney." Being old and ill, she had difficulty getting up the twenty-two stairs which led to her bedroom. Despite her previous protests, Glückel eventually gives in to her son-in-law Moses Krumbach's demands to move in with him and his wife, Esther. In 1715, she finally moves in with her daughter and son-in-law and experiences life in a rapidly changing Metz. The memoirs close with the following passage:

"In the month of Nisan, 5479 [March–April 1719], a woman was kneeling by the bank of the Moselle, washing her dishes. It was about ten o'clock at night, and of a sudden it became as light as day, and the woman looked in the Heavens, and the Heavens were opened, like unto a...[word illegible]...and sparks flew therefrom; and then the Heavens closed, as one closes a curtain, and all was dark again. God grant that it be for our good!"

=== Translations ===
The original manuscript was lost, but a copy made by Glückel's son Moses survived. The family copy was used to create the first printed edition entitled Zikhroynes (Yiddish for "Memoirs"), which was edited by David Kaufmann and published in 1896. Bertha Pappenheim, one of Glückel's great-granddaughters, published the first German translation of the Memoirs in 1910. In 1913, an alternate abridged German translation by Alfred Feilchenfeld was published and, due to its immense popularity, went into its fourth edition by 1923. Feilchenfeld's edition eventually became the basis of the first English translation by Marvin Lowenthal, published in 1932 and reissued in 1960 and 1977. In 1962, Beth-Zion Abrahams offered a more accurate English translation of the original Kaufmann edition. An abridged Hebrew translation based on the Feilchenfeld edition was published by A. Z. Rabinowitz in Tel Aviv in 1930. Joseph Berenfeld completed a full translation of the memoirs into modern Yiddish in 1967.

== Legacy and descendants ==
The permanent exhibition at the Jewish Museum Berlin (Jüdisches Museum Berlin) featured Glückel of Hameln from 2001 to 2017. "Two Millennia of German-Jewish History" was broken down into fourteen periods spanning from the Middle Ages to the present, with Glückel representing the Baroque period. The exhibit has been closed since 2017 for a complete redesign and is expected to re-open on August 23, 2020. It is still unclear if Glückel will be featured in the new redesign.

Her memoirs have been adapted several times. Margoa Winston's fictionalized "Glückel Von Hameln: a Dramatization of Her Autobiography" appeared in print in 1941. Adrienne Cooper and Frank London of the Great Small Works theater troupe brought the memoirs to the stage in the early 2000s. The production combined puppetry with European storytelling traditions and was performed in both Yiddish and English.

In 2016, a street in Hamburg was named after Glückel. Glückel-von-Hameln-Straße is located in the borough of Altona, the same place to which her family and all other Hamburg Jews were exiled in 1648.

Because her family lineage is so well documented, it has been possible to identify many of her descendants. Among these are notable figures such as Bertha Pappenheim, Heinrich Heine, and Rabbi Samson Raphael Hirsch.

Her importance further lies in giving a fuller picture of the lives of Jewish women of her time, as we have limited sources that do so. Gluckel's memoirs complicate the idea of Jewish women living entirely domestic lives, instead showing that some Jewish women could display autonomy outside the home and be deeply involved in business, commerce, etc. Her memoirs stand as a testament to the possibilities for independence that Jewish women had, whether with family, religion, business, or more.

== Bibliography ==
- Manuscript in original Yiddish:
  - Ms. hebr. oct. 2 - Zikhronot
- Original publication in Yiddish, with introduction in German:
  - Zikhroynes Glikl Hamel, זיכרונות גליקל האמיל, Die Memoiren der Glückel von Hameln, 1645–1719. Herausg. von David Kaufmann. Frankfurt am Main, J. Kauffmann, 1896.
- German translations:
  - Die Memoiren der Glückel von Hameln. Aus dem Jüdisch-Deutschen von Bertha Pappenheim (Autorisierte Übertragung nach der Ausgabe von Prof. Dr. David Kaufmann, Wien 1910). Mit einem Vorwort von Viola Roggenkamp. Weinheim und Basel: Beltz Verlag, 2005.
  - Denkwürdigkeiten der Glückel von Hameln. Aus dem Jüdisch-Deutschen übersetzt, mit Erläuterungen versehen und hrsg. von Alfred Feilchenfeld. Mit 25 Bildbeigaben. Berlin, Jüdischer Verlag, 1913.
- English translations:
  - Memoirs of Glückel of Hameln. Translated by Marvin Lowenthal, 1977 (ISBN 0805205721)
  - The Life of Glückel of Hameln 1646–1724, Written by herself. Translated from the original Yiddish and edited by Beth-Zion Abrahams, Yoselof 1963 (1962 Horovitz Publ. Co., London).
  - Glikl. Memoirs. 1691–1719, Edited and Annotated with an Introduction by Chava Turniansky, Translated by Sara Friedman, Brandeis University Press, Waltham, Massachusetts 2019.
- Hebrew translations:
  - Gliḳl : zikhronot 1691-1719, hehedirah ṿe-tirgemah mi-Yiddish Chava Turniansky, Jerusalem 2006. (English title: Glikl. Memoires 1691-1719, Edited and Translated from the Yiddish by Chava Turniansky, The Zalman Shazar Center for Jewish History and The Ben-Zion Dinur Center for Research in Jewish History, The Hebrew University, Jerusalem 2006).(ISBN 9652272132). (Note: this edition also includes the Yiddish text.)

== See also ==
- Yiddish language
- Yiddish literature
