= Rosenheim (disambiguation) =

Rosenheim may refer to:

- Rosenheim, a city in Bavaria, Germany
  - Rosenheim station, a railway station in the city
- Rosenheim, Rhineland-Palatinate, a municipality in the district of Altenkirchen, Germany
- Rosenheim (district), in Bavaria, Germany
- Rosenheim (electoral district), which elects a representative to the Bundestag in Germany
- Rosenheim, Alberta, a community in Municipal District of Provost No. 52, Alberta, Canada
- Rosenheim (surname)
