= Bertha Pappenheim =

Austrian-Jewish feminist (1859 – 1936)

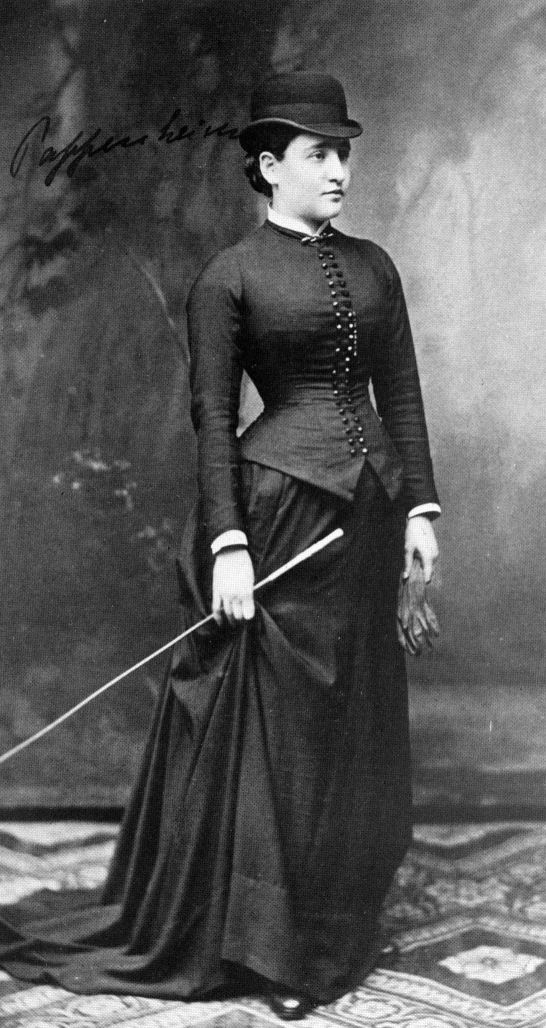
- Pappenheim in 1882
- Born: 27 February 1859; Vienna, Austrian Empire
- Died: 28 May 1936 (aged 77); Neu-Isenburg, Nazi Germany
- Other names: Anna O., Paul Berthold
- Occupations: Social worker and president of the Jüdischer Frauenbund
- Known for: Jüdischer Frauenbund, early case of Josef Breuer

Bertha Pappenheim (27 February 1859 – 28 May 1936) was an Austrian-Jewish feminist, a social worker pioneer, and the founder of the Jewish Women's Association (Jüdischer Frauenbund). Under the pseudonym Anna O., she was also one of Josef Breuer's best-documented patients because of Sigmund Freud's writings on Breuer's treatment of her.

== Childhood and youth ==
Bertha Pappenheim was born on 27 February 1859 in Vienna, the third daughter of Recha Pappenheim and Sigmund Pappenheim. Her mother Recha, née Goldschmidt (1830–1905), was from an old and wealthy family in Frankfurt am Main. Her father Sigmund (1824–1881), a merchant, the son of an Orthodox Jewish family from Preßburg, Austria-Hungary (today's Bratislava, Slovakia), was the cofounder of the Orthodox Schiffschul in Vienna; the family name alludes to the Franconian town of Pappenheim. As "just another daughter" in a strictly traditional Jewish household, Bertha was conscious that her parents would have preferred a male child. Her parents' families held traditional Jewish views on marriage and had roots in Orthodox Judaism. Bertha was raised in the style of a well-bred young lady of good class. She attended a Roman Catholic girls' school and led a life structured by the Jewish holiday calendar and summer vacations in Ischl.

When she was eight years old, her oldest sister Henriette (1849–1867) died of galloping consumption, now known as a form of tuberculosis. When she was 11 the family moved from Vienna's Leopoldstadt, which was primarily inhabited by poverty-ridden Jews, to Liechtensteinstraße in the Alsergrund. She left school when she was sixteen, devoted herself to needlework and helped her mother with the kosher preparation of their food. Her 18-month-younger brother Wilhelm (1860–1937) was meanwhile attending a high school, which offered in those days prestige and status, and which made Bertha intensely jealous.

== Illness and treatment as Anna O. ==
Between 1880 and 1882, Pappenheim was treated for a variety of symptoms that began when her father suddenly fell seriously ill in mid-1880 during a family holiday in Ischl. His illness was a turning point in her life. While sitting up at night at his sickbed she was suddenly tormented by hallucinations and a state of anxiety. At first the family did not react to these symptoms, but in November 1880 a friend of the family, the physician Josef Breuer, began to treat her. He encouraged her, sometimes under light hypnosis, to narrate stories, which led to partial improvement of the clinical picture, although her overall condition continued to deteriorate. Breuer kept his then-friend Sigmund Freud abreast of her case, informing his earliest analysis of the origins of hysteria.

Starting on 11 December, Pappenheim was bedridden for several months. When her father died, on 5 April 1881, she became fully rigid and did not eat for days. Her symptoms continued to get worse and on 7 June she was admitted against her will to the Inzersdorf sanatorium, where she remained until November. After returning she continued to be treated by Breuer. She returned to this sanatorium several times over the course of the following years (sometimes at her own wish).

The slow and laborious progress of what Breuer called her "remembering work", in which she recalled individual symptoms after they had occurred, thus "dissolving" them, came to a conclusion on 7 June 1882 after she had reconstructed the first night of hallucinations in Ischl. Breuer concluded his case report with the words "She has fully recovered since that time".

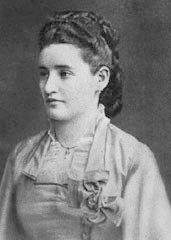
Pappenheim during her time as Anna O.

Anna O. was the pseudonym given to Pappenheim by Breuer while she was his patient, in his descriptions of her as a case study. The pseudonym was constructed by shifting her initials "B.P." one letter back in the alphabet to "A.O." Aspects of the Anna O. case were first published by Freud and Breuer in 1893 as preliminary communications in two Viennese medical journals. The detailed case history appeared in 1895 in his book Studies on Hysteria, written in collaboration with Freud.

=== Symptoms ===
Pappenheim was treated by Breuer for severe cough, paralysis of the extremities on the right side of her body, and disturbances of vision, hearing, and speech, as well as hallucination and loss of consciousness. She was diagnosed with hysteria. Freud implies that her illness was a result of the resentment felt over her father's real and physical illness that later led to his death.

Throughout the two years of her illness, she developed a wide spectrum of symptoms:

- Language disorders (aphasia): on some occasions she could not speak at all, sometimes she spoke only English, or only French, or Italian. She could however always understand German. The periods of aphasia could last for days, and sometimes varied with the time of day.
- Neuralgia: she suffered from facial pain which was treated with morphine and chloral and led to addiction. The pain was so severe that surgical severance of the trigeminus nerve was considered.
- Paralysis (paresis): signs of paralysis and numbness occurred in her limbs, primarily on only one side. Although she was right-handed, she had to learn to write with her left hand because of this condition.
- Visual impairments: she had temporary motor disturbances in her eyes. She perceived objects as being greatly enlarged and she squinted.
- Mood swings: Over long periods she had daily swings between conditions of anxiety and depression, followed by relaxed states.
- Amnesia: when she was in one of these states she could not remember events or any of her own actions which took place when she was in the other state.
- Eating disorders: in crisis situations she refused to eat. During one hot summer she rejected liquids for weeks and lived only on fruit.
- Pseudocyesis: there are some accounts that during her final meeting with Breuer she exhibited symptoms of a false pregnancy. Freud later claimed that she accused Breuer of impregnating her, but admitted that this was a guess.

While some believe that Freud misdiagnosed her, others meticulously refute these claims.

Many researchers have speculated about organic or neurological illnesses that may have caused Pappenheim's symptoms. Medical historian Elizabeth Marianne Thornton suggested in Freud and Cocaine (1983) that Pappenheim had tuberculous meningitis, a view supported by professor of psychology Hans Eysenck, but not by neuropsychiatrist and professor of neurology Richard Restak who describes the theory as "simply preposterous" since the mortality rate for tuberculous meningitis at the time was virtually 100 percent and those who survived were severely disabled (Pappenheim lived for another 55 years). Others have suggested it was encephalitis, a form of brain inflammation. Many have suggested that she suffered from a form of temporal lobe epilepsy since many of her symptoms, including imagined smells, are common symptoms of types of epilepsy. According to one perspective, "examination of the neurological details suggests that Anna suffered from complex partial seizures exacerbated by drug dependence."

=== Treatment by Breuer ===
Breuer began the therapy without a clear method or theoretical basis. The treatment of her symptoms ranged from feeding her when she rejected food to dosages of chloral when she was agitated. He described his observations as follows:

She had two completely separate states of consciousness which alternated quite often and suddenly, and in the course of her illness became more and more distinct. In the one state she was sad and apprehensive, but relatively normal. In the other state she had hallucinations and "misbehaved", that is, she swore, threw pillows at people ... etc.

He noted that when in one condition she could not remember events or situations that had occurred in the other condition. He concluded, "it is difficult to avoid saying that she dissolved into two personalities, one of which was psychically normal and the other mentally ill." Such symptoms are associated with the clinical picture of what was then referred to as "split personality" and today is referred to as dissociative identity disorder.

Breuer noted that "Although everyone thought she was present, she was living in a fantasy, but as she was always present when addressed, nobody suspected it." An initial therapeutic approach was suggested by the observation that her anxiety and language difficulties seemed to dissolve whenever she was asked to tell stories that had arisen from her daydreams. Breuer encouraged her to calmly "reel off" these stories by using such prompts as a first sentence. The formula he used was always the same: "There was a boy..." At times Pappenheim could only express herself in English, but usually understood the German spoken around her. Of her stories Breuer said, "The stories, always sad, were sometimes quite nice, similar to Andersen's Picture Book Without Pictures."

The patient was aware of the relief that "rattling off" brought her, and she described the process using the terms "chimney-sweeping" and "talking cure". The latter term subsequently became part of psychoanalytic terminology.

Other levels of story telling soon came up, and were combined with and penetrated each other. Examples include:

- Stories from a "private theater"
- Hallucinatory experiences
- Temporal relocation of episodes: during one phase her experience of the illness was shifted by one year
- Episodes of occurrence of hysterical symptoms

Breuer noticed that systematic remembering and spontaneously describing the occasions when hysterical symptoms first occurred had a therapeutic effect on Pappenheim. To his surprise, he noticed that a symptom disappeared after the first occurrence was remembered, or after the cause was "excavated".

Breuer described his final method as follows: in the morning he asked Pappenheim, whom he had put under light hypnosis, about the occasions and circumstances under which a particular symptom occurred. When he saw her in the evening, these episodes—there were sometimes over 100—were systematically "reeled off" by Pappenheim in reverse temporal order. When she got to the first occurrence and thus to the "cause", the symptoms appeared in an intensified form and then disappeared "forever".

Breuer later described the therapy as "a trial by ordeal". He spent 1,000 hours with his patient over the course of two years.

==== Accounts of final session ====
The first possible account is that this therapy came to a conclusion when they had worked their way back to a black snake hallucination which Pappenheim experienced one night in Ischl when she was at her father's sickbed. Breuer describes this finish as follows:

In this way all the hysteria came to an end. The patient herself had made a firm resolution to finish the business on the anniversary of her transfer to the countryside. For that reason she pursued the "talking cure" with great energy and animation. On the final day she reproduced the anxiety hallucination which was the root of all her illness and in which she could only think and pray in English, helped along by rearranging the room to resemble her father's sickroom. Immediately thereafter she spoke German and was then free of all the innumerable individual disorders which she had formerly shown.

An alternate story is that on the eve of his final analysis with her, he was called back to her home to find her experiencing severe stomach cramps and hallucinating that she was having his child. Of course, there was no child. His comportment towards her has never been questioned nor is there any indication that it should have been—as Breuer was the first analyst of the first patient to undergo analysis, transference was not understood. Breuer promptly handed Pappenheim's care over to a colleague. He would have no more to do with her. Freud's initial encouragement to continue his talking therapy was met by Breuer's insistence that he'd had quite enough of hysterical women and wanted nothing more to do with them. It would be another four years before Sigmund Freud could persuade him to once again attempt psychotherapy or to deal with women diagnosed as hysterical, and a further six years passed before Breuer was willing to publish on the subject of the talking cure.

One of the most discussed aspects of the case of Ana O. is the phenomenon of transference, in which the patient, Bertha Pappenheim, developed ambiguous feelings toward her doctor, Josef Breuer. These feelings varied between a desire for closeness and hostility. Accounts indicate a notable episode in which Ana O. reportedly manifested delusions, even suggesting an imaginary pregnancy by Breuer. This incident caused discomfort among her family and the doctors involved, and raised ethical questions about the emotional influence in the doctor-patient relationship. Sigmund Freud, who discussed the case with Breuer, recognized transference as a fundamental aspect of the therapeutic process, interpreting it as the manifestation of unconscious desires toward the figure of the therapist. This concept would become one of the pillars of psychoanalysis, later explored and deepened in Freud’s studies on the treatment of neuroses.

Legends arose of this alternate conclusion. It was handed down in slightly different versions by various people; one version is contained in a letter from Freud to Stefan Zweig:

I was in a position to guess what really happened with Breuer's patient long after we parted company when I recalled a communication from Breuer dating from the time before our joint work and relating to another context, and which he never repeated. That evening, after all her symptoms were overcome, he was again called to her, and found her confused and writhing with abdominal cramps. When asked what was the matter she responded, "Now the child I have from Dr. Breuer is coming". At that moment he had in his hand the key which would open the way to the Mothers, but he dropped it. With all his intellectual talents he was devoid of anything Faustian. He took flight in conventional horror and passed on the patient to a colleague. She struggled for months in a sanatorium to regain her health.
I was so sure of my reconstruction that I published it somewhere. Breuer's younger daughter (who was born shortly after the conclusion of that therapy, which is not irrelevant as to a meaningful connection) read my portrayal and asked her father about it (this was shortly before his death). He confirmed my analysis, which she later relayed to me.

As nothing is known of such a publication by Freud, it is not clear where Breuer's daughter could have read it. In the version by Ernest Jones, after his flight Breuer quickly goes on a second honeymoon to Venice with his wife Mathilda, who actually conceives a child there—in contrast to the imaginary child of Pappenheim. There is no evidence for any of this, and most of it has been proved false. Breuer did not flee but rather referred his patient to Kreuzlingen. He did not go to Venice, but with his family on a summer vacation to Gmunden, and he did not conceive a child (either in Venice or in Gmunden), since his youngest child—Dora Breuer—was born on 11 March 1882, three months before the alleged conception.

Freud's purpose in describing the conclusion of treatment in a way that contradicts some of the verifiable facts is unclear. The assumption that he wanted to make himself the sole discoverer of psychoanalysis at Breuer's expense is contradicted by the description of the discovery in Freud's writings, in which he does not minimize Breuer's role, but rather emphasizes it.

==== Success of treatment ====
After Breuer ceased treating her, both he and Freud continued to follow the course of Pappenheim's illness. Among Freud's disciples the dubiousness of the assertion of "treatment success" was discussed. In a private seminar Carl Gustav Jung said in 1925 that Freud's "famous first case he treated together with Breuer and which was vastly praised as an outstanding therapeutic success was nothing of the sort."

In contrast, Lucy Freeman reports that Pappenheim made a remarkable recovery following her treatment. Their talking therapy had helped her rid herself of every symptom manifesting from repressed events and emotions. Breuer left Pappenheim on the eve of their final session convinced she was completely cured. In the period following the treatment Pappenheim struggled with morphine addiction following a doctor's prescription. Over time she recovered and led a productive life.

How Pappenheim herself assessed the success of her treatment is not documented. It is assumed that Pappenheim destroyed all relevant documentation during her last stay in Vienna in 1935.

=== Bellevue Sanatorium ===
On 12 July 1882, Breuer referred Pappenheim to the private Bellevue Clinic in Kreuzlingen on Lake Constance, which was headed by Robert Binswanger. After treatment in Bellevue she was no longer personally treated by Breuer.

While in Kreuzlingen she visited her cousins Fritz Homburger and Anna Ettlinger in Karlsruhe. The latter was one of the founders of the Karlsruhe High School for Girls ('Mädchengymnasium'), which was attended by the young Rahel Straus. Ettlinger engaged in literary work. In an article which appeared in 1870 entitled "A Discussion of Women's Rights" ('Ein Gespräch über die Frauenfrage') she demanded equal education rights for women. She also gave private lessons, and organized "ladies' literature courses".

Pappenheim read aloud to her some of the stories she had written, and her cousin, 14 years her senior, encouraged her to continue her literary activities. During this visit toward the end of 1882 Pappenheim also participated in a training course for nurses which was offered by the Women's Association of Baden ('Badischer Frauenverein'). The purpose of this training was to qualify young ladies to head nursing institutions. She could not finish the course before her visit came to an end.

On 29 October 1882 her condition improved and she was released from treatment in Kreuzlingen. Though there were some initial setbacks, Pappenheim went on to become one of the most revered women in Germany and in European Jewry. She never discussed Breuer's treatment or Freud's later work, but opposed any attempts at psychoanalytic treatment of people in her care. Unlike Freud, who thought that anti-sexual childhood socialization could have a negative effect, Pappenheim thought that sexual promiscuity in young girls could be fought with education and Jewish values.

== Public life ==
In November 1888, when she was 29 and after her convalescence, she and her mother moved to her mother's home town of Frankfurt, Germany. Their family environment was partially Orthodox and partly liberal. In contrast to their life in Vienna they became involved in art and science, and not only in charitable work.

Shortly after moving to Frankfurt, she first worked in a soup kitchen and read aloud in an orphanage for Jewish girls run by the Israelitischer Frauenverein ('Israelite Women's Association'). In discovering the children's delight at H. C. Andersen's tales, she shared her own tales. In this environment, Pappenheim intensified her literary efforts and became involved in social and political activities. Her publications began in 1888 and were initially anonymous; they appeared from 1890 under the pseudonym Paul Berthold, and she began publishing under her own name in 1902, firstly in the journal Ethische Kultur ('Ethical Culture') .

In 1895 she was temporarily in charge of the orphanage, and one year later became its official director. During the following 12 years she was able to orient the educational program away from the one and only goal of subsequent marriage, to training with a view to vocational independence.

Having witnessed Catholic and Protestant charities working to address the issue of white female slavery, Pappenheim sought to align herself with a Jewish charity with a similar mission. Her cousin, Louise, informed her that not only did no such organization exist, but it was an issue the Jewish population wished not to acknowledge. She entreated several Rabbis to address the issue of Jewish men in Turkey and Frankfurt heavily involved in the trafficking of Jewish girls and women. As well, she addressed the problem of Jewish men walking out on their families to relocate and remarry without having issued a divorce, thus leaving their wives "Agunot", unable to remarry under Jewish law.

The situation forced many women to sell their children to men—often under the persuasion the girl would be hired out to a wealthy family with lifetime opportunities. Other women knowingly sold their daughters into prostitution because they had no means of supporting their children. Jewish girls caught in the white slavery trap discovered by the German police had no organization which advocated for them. Without proper papers and no means of returning home, many turned to prostitution.

=== Activism ===
In 1895, a plenary meeting of the Allgemeiner Deutscher Frauenverein (ADF; 'General German Women's Association') took place in Frankfurt. Pappenheim was a participant and later contributed to the establishment of a local ADF group.

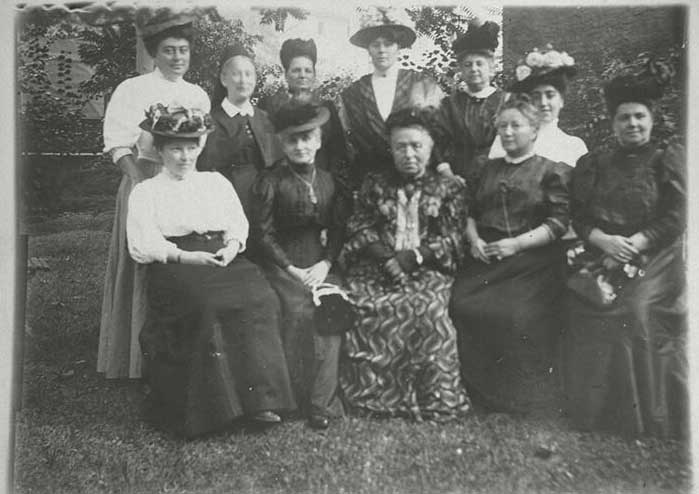
The first Board of the Weibliche Fürsorge in Frankfurt, 1904 (Pappenheim: first row, second from the left).

After she gave a speech at the Israelitischer Hilfsverein ('Israelite Women's Aid Association') in 1901, a women's group was formed with the goal of coordinating and professionalizing the work of various social initiatives and projects. This group was first a part of the Israelitischer Hilfsverein, but in 1904 became an independent organization, Weibliche Fürsorge ('Women's Relief').

At the first German conference on combating traffic in women held in Frankfurt in October 1902, Pappenheim and Sara Rabinowitsch were asked to travel to Galicia to investigate the social situation there. In her 1904 report about this trip, which lasted several months, she described the problems that arose from a combination of agrarian backwardness and early industrialization as well as from the collision of Hasidism and Zionism.

At a meeting of the International Council of Women held in 1904 in Berlin, it was decided to found a national Jewish women's association. Similar to the Bund Deutscher Frauenvereine (BDF; 'Federation of German Women's Associations'), co-founded by Helene Lange in 1894, the intent was to unite the social and emancipatory efforts of Jewish women's associations. Pappenheim was elected the first president of the Jüdischer Frauenbund (JFB; 'League of Jewish Women') and was its head for 20 years, contributing to its efforts until her death in 1936. The JFB joined the BDF in 1907. Between 1914 and 1924, Pappenheim was on the board of the BDF.

On the one hand the goals of the JFB were feminist—strengthening women's rights and advancing the gainful employment of Jewish women—and on the other hand they were in accordance with the traditional goals of Jewish philanthropy—practical charity, as a divine precept. Integrating these different objectives was not always easy for Pappenheim. A particular objection was that in her battle against traffic in women she not only spoke openly about Jewish women as victims, but also about Jewish men as perpetrators. She criticized how women were perceived in Judaism, and as a member of the German feminist movement she demanded that the ideal of equal rights for women be realized also within Jewish institutions. She was particularly concerned about education and job equality.

Meanwhile, the JFB grew steadily and in 1907 had 32,000 members in 82 associations. For a time the JFB was the largest charitable Jewish organization with over 50,000 members. In 1917 Pappenheim called for "an end to the splintering of Jewish welfare work," which helped lead to the founding of the Zentralwohlfahrtsstelle der Juden in Deutschland ('Central Welfare Agency of German Jewry'), which continues to exist today. Her work on its board was supported by Sidonie Werner.

In May 1923, she was one of the principal speakers at the First World Congress of Jewish Women in Vienna, where she spoke on the need to protect Jewish girls and women from trafficking and prostitution.

After the Nazis assumed power in 1933, Pappenheim again took over the presidency of the JFB. She resigned in 1934 because she could not abandon her negative attitude to Zionism, despite the existential threat for Jews in Germany, while in the JFP, as among German Jews in general, Zionism was increasingly endorsed after 1933. Especially her attitude toward the immigration of young people to Israel (Youth Aliya) was controversial. She rejected the emigration of children and youths to Palestine while their parents remained in Germany. However, she herself brought a group of orphanage children safely to Great Britain in 1934. After the antisemitic Nuremberg Laws were passed on 15 September 1935, she changed her mind and argued in favor of the emigration of the Jewish population.

After Pappenheim died, her JFB positions were partially taken over by her friend Hannah Karminski. In 1939 the JFB was disbanded by the Nazis.

=== Neu-Isenburg home ===
Pappenheim was the founder or initiator of many institutions, including kindergartens, community homes and educational institutions. She considered her life's work to be the Neu-Isenburg home for Jewish girls (Mädchenwohnheim Neu-Isenburg).

Starting around 1906 Pappenheim devoted herself to the goal of founding a refuge to help illegitimate girls and Jewish women endangered by prostitution and traffic in women, where she could implement the theories she had developed on Jewish social work. This home was to be operated on the following principles:

- In contrast to traditional Jewish charities, modern social work should be undertaken, focusing mainly on education and training for an independent life.
- In accord with the principle of "follow-up aid," former home inhabitants' progress through life was to be monitored for an extended period to avert renewed negligence.
- The home should not be "an establishment caring for juveniles in the legal sense, no monument in stone to some foundation, with inscriptions, votive tablets, corridors, dormitories and dining halls, an elementary school, a detention room and cells, and a dominating director's family, but rather a home, although it can be only a surrogate for the proper raising of children in their own families, which was preferable."
- The residents should become involved in Jewish tradition and culture.
- The home should be kept simple, so that the residents become familiar with the realities and requirements of a lower middle class household.

Louise Goldschmidt, a relative of Pappenheim's mother, made available a pair of semi-detached houses where a girl's home could be established in Neu-Isenburg near Frankfurt am Main with all its clinics and social institutions. In contrast to Prussian Frankfurt, Hessian Neu-Isenburg's less rigid laws also had advantages for stateless persons.

Thanks to donations amounting to 19,000 marks to furnish the house, it could begin operations on 25 November 1907 with the goal of providing "protection for those needing protection and education for those needing education."

The facility was plain, and was sometimes criticized for being excessively so. There was, for example, no running water in the bathrooms, and central heating was only added in 1920. But the facilities did make it possible to strictly adhere to Jewish dietary and purity requirements, (kashruth, kosher). In the basement a passover kitchen was available, although it was required only once a year.

Art in the house and the garden was to serve to educate the residents. Examples are the children's fountain, Der vertriebene Storch ('The Expelled Stork'), designed by Fritz J. Kormis to illustrate a tale by Pappenheim, lecture series, modest theater performances, and speeches, among others by Martin Buber, a friend of Pappenheim and a guest on several occasions.

The number of residents was initially low, but grew in the course of time from 10 in 1908 to 152 in 1928. The property and existing buildings were expanded with purchases and donations and adapted to meet increasing requirements, and additional buildings were constructed. In the end, the home consisted of four buildings, including one for pregnant women and those who had just given birth—the delivery itself took place in a Frankfurt clinic—and an isolation ward.

The home's school-aged children attended the Neu-Isenburg elementary school. There was extensive medical care for the residents, and—at regular intervals—psychiatric examinations. Pappenheim rejected psychoanalytic treatment for the residents. Although she technically never experienced psychoanalytic therapy herself due to it not yet existing, her treatment by Breuer can be regarded as an early form of the therapy. Pappenheim only spoke once about psychoanalysis in general:

Psychoanalysis is in the hands of a doctor, what confession is in the hands of a Catholic priest; whether it becomes a good instrument or a double edged sword depends on who is administering it, and on the treatment.

Since the ongoing financing of the home was preferably not to depend on rich individual patrons, an association, the Heim des jüdischen Frauenbundes e.V. ('Home of the Jewish Women's Association'), was established to act as its sponsor and owner. Membership fees of 3 marks per year were supposed to put the covering of running expenses on a broad basis.

Appreciation for her Neu-Isenburg work was not at first forthcoming for Pappenheim. Orthodox Jewish circles considered the founding of the home to be a scandal, and its existence a tacit toleration of prostitution and immorality. In order to reintegrate into the Jewish community single mothers, young prostitutes and their children, who in most cases had been disowned by their families, the home would urge families to resume relations with them, and known fathers to marry the mothers of their children, or pay alimony.

After the death of Pappenheim in 1936, the work in Neu-Isenburg could continue essentially unhindered until the 1936 Olympic Games. In 1937, the children residing in the home were no longer allowed to attend the Neu-Isenburg elementary school and had to be transported daily to the Jewish school in Frankfurt. In 1938, the Isenburg branch of the NSDAP instigated the closure of the home.

On 10 November 1938, one day after the November Pogrom ('Reichskristallnacht'), the home was attacked. The main building was set afire and burned down, and the other buildings were wrecked. On 31 March 1942 the home was disbanded by the Gestapo. The remaining residents were deported to the concentration camp in Theresienstadt, where many died.

=== Literary works ===
==== Stories, plays, poetry ====
Pappenheim published her first works anonymously, and later under the pseudonym Paul Berthold, a common practice among women writers of that time. She derived the pseudonym by modifying her first name Bertha to a surname, Berthold, and using the initial of her surname, P, as the first letter of the first name, Paul. Starting in 1902 she published novellas and plays under her own name.

Kleine Geschichten für Kinder ('Little Stories for Children') appeared anonymously in 1888, to be followed in 1890 by a volume of tales, In der Trödelbude (In the Junk Shop). The nine novella in this volume have as their subject in each case a defective or otherwise useless item, such as a piece of lace, a music box, or a coffee pot.

In 1913 she published the play Tragische Momente. Drei Lebensbilder ('Tragic Moments. Three Scenes from Life'). The scenes correspond to three episodes in the life of a Jewish couple. In the first scene the young couple experiences the atrocities of the 1904 Kishinev pogrom in the Russian Empire and flees to Frankfurt. In the second scene, as Russian Jews, they are not accepted in the community. A Jewish innkeeper wants to employ the woman as a hostess and the man as a trickster. When they turn down his offer, he denounces them as political criminals, and they flee to Palestine. The third scene shows the man as a widower waiting for his son to return from Europe. When the son confesses that he cannot imagine a life as a farmer in Palestine, his father commits suicide. Pappenheim refused to have the play performed at a JFP assembly of delegates in 1933, "since the 'Tragic Moments', which I wrote without an ulterior motive, would certainly give rise to objections in Zionist circles because of their timeliness." She advised against "scattering explosives among the women".

In addition, she wrote numerous texts that were unpublished during her lifetime. Most are lost, and what remains is scattered. Among the scattered texts are the so-called Denkzettel ("Memoranda"), short maxims and sayings, some of which are dated and some of which she later had her secretary Lucy Jourdan collect and copy. An example: "Whoever foregoes his freedom without an urgent necessity does not deserve it." These texts also include the prayers published by the League of Jewish Women shortly after Pappenheim's death. These are not prayers in the sense of traditional Judaism, but personal poems addressed to God.

One of Pappenheim's poems was written in 1910–1912:

Love did not come to me –
So I vegetate like a plant,
In a cellar, without light.
Love did not come to me –
So I resound like a violin,
Whose bow has been broken.
Love did not come to me –
So I immerse myself in work,
Living myself sore from duty.
Love did not come to me –
So I gladly think of death,
As a friendly face.

==== Translations ====
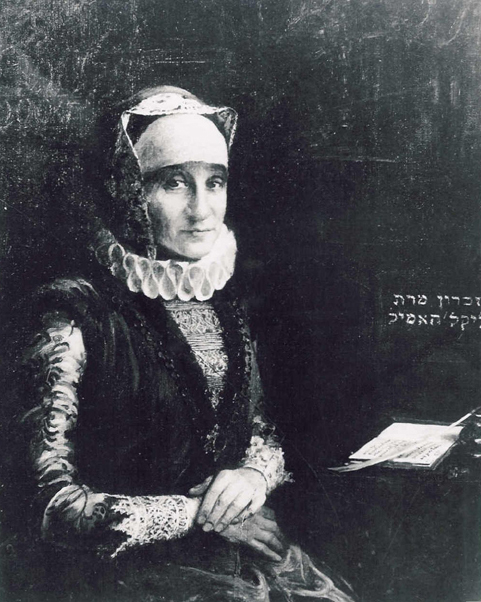
Pappenheim as Glikl bas Judah Leib

One of her first productions was a translation from English of Mary Wollstonecraft's programmatic paper in English on the women's rights movement, A Vindication of the Rights of Woman. It appeared in 1899 under the title Mary Wollstonecraft – Eine Verteidigung der Rechte der Frau.

Starting in 1910 she translated several important Yiddish texts into German:

- The memoirs of Glikl bas Judah Leib (also known as Glückel of Hameln), one of Pappenheim's ancestors (1910).
- The Maysebukh "Storybook", also known as the "Women's Talmud", a collection of stories from the Talmud and the Midrash (1929)
- Parts of Tz'enah Ur'enah, also known as the "Women's Bible."

Only the first part of her translation of the Women's Bible appeared, the Book of Genesis. The translations of Exodus and Deuteronomy have reportedly been lost.

Pappenheim dealt exclusively with texts written by women or for women. The Ma'assebuch and the Women's Bible were the most widely distributed works of Yiddish women's literature. She described the purpose of her translations in the foreword to the memoirs of Glikl:

Putting the text into modern language and punctuation has the purpose of reanimating the image of a woman who, deeply rooted in her times, stands out because of her unusual intellectual gifts, and is true to her faith, true to her people, true to her family, and true to herself.

And in the foreword to the Ma'assebuch she wrote:

In the hands of parents, educators and teachers the Allerlei Geschichten (All Kinds of Stories) can be a bridge to a new understanding of the meaning of traditional Jewish culture and beliefs.

Together with her brother Wilhelm and their relative, Stefan Meyer, she found out while researching her family tree that she was distantly related to Glikl. She also had Leopold Pilichowski (1869–1933) make a portrait of her as Glikl.

==== Articles and information pamphlets ====
The focus of her writings was to provide information, especially about the social situation of Jewish refugees and the traffic in women. In 1924 she published her most well-known book, Sisyphus-Arbeit (Sisyphean Labor), a study on the traffic in women and prostitution in Eastern Europe and Asia.

== Personal life ==
Women who influenced Pappenheim were Glückel of Hameln, Mary Wollstonecraft, and Helene Lange. Breuer describes her as a woman "of considerable intelligence, astonishingly astute reasoning and sharp-sighted intuition..."

After her mother died in 1905 Pappenheim lived alone for many years without a private attachment. "Mir ward die Liebe nicht" ('love did not come to me'), she lamented in a poem dated 1911.

In 1924 a close friendship began with Hannah Karminski, a woman 40 years her junior, when Karminski took over the leadership of the Jüdischer Mädchenclub ('Jewish Girl's Club'). Both women spent their free time together as much as possible. When in 1925 Karminski moved for a time to Berlin, they wrote to each other almost daily.

While on a trip in Austria in 1935, she donated two of her collections (lace and small cast iron objects) to the Museum of Applied Arts in Vienna. From Vienna she traveled on to Ischl. While traveling, her general condition deteriorated and she was taken to the Israelite Hospital in Munich. During an operation which took place there it was determined that she had a malignant tumor. Despite her illness she traveled, at the end of 1935, to Amsterdam in order to meet Henrietta Szold, the head of Youth Aliyah, and again to Galicia, to advise the Beth Jacob Schools. After returning to Frankfurt her condition deteriorated further and she became unable to leave her bed. She also had jaundice.

During her last few days of life, she was summoned for questioning by the state police station in Offenbach, the reason being denunciation by an employee of the home. A girl with an intellectual disability had made what was considered by the police to be a derogatory comment about Adolf Hitler. Pappenheim refused to appear at the hearing because of poor health. After the hearing on 16 April 1936, for which she calmly but firmly supplied information regarding the accusation, no further steps were taken on the part of the police.

She died on 28 May 1936, cared for until the end by her friend Karminski, and was buried next to her mother in the Jewish cemetery in Frankfurt.

After Pappenheim's death, Karminski took over many of her roles in the JBF. On 9 December 1942, Karminski was taken to the extermination camp in Auschwitz-Birkenau where she was murdered on 4 June 1943.

== Legacy ==
When the first volume of Ernest Jones' Freud biography appeared in 1953, in which Anna O. was identified as Pappenheim, her friends and admirers were outraged; they only knew her from her time in Frankfurt. One of the reasons for Dora Edinger's biography was to contrast her identification as being "mentally ill", which at the time was considered defamatory, with a depiction of Pappenheim as a philanthropist and advocate of women's rights.

As Pappenheim did not speak of her illness, let alone maintain a complete record, details of her life during that time are largely taken from records of Breuer and Freud. Jones' portrayal contained further details, especially legends about the conclusion of Breuer's treatment, but except for the information contained in the studies nothing was known about the further course of her illness. New facts only became known based on research by Henri Ellenberger and subsequently by Albrecht Hirschmüller, who were able to find Breuer's case history of Pappenheim and other documents in the archives of the Bellevue Clinic in Kreuzlingen. Freud's letters to his fiancée Martha Bernays which have been published contain a few hints about the course of Pappenheim's therapy and Freud's relationship to Breuer, but until all of Freud's letters are published there is room for speculation.

In 1954 a German postage stamp with a portrait of Pappenheim was issued in the series "Benefactors of Mankind" in recognition of her services. On the 50th anniversary of her death, a conference was held on various aspects of her life. On the former site of the Neu Isenburg home for endangered girls and unwed mothers, a seminar room and memorial to Pappenheim were inaugurated in 1997.

Aspects of Pappenheim's biography (especially her time as Breuer's patient) were treated in the film Freud: The Secret Passion by John Huston (along with elements of other early psychoanalytic case histories). The film is based on a screenplay by Jean-Paul Sartre who, however, distanced himself from the film version.

Josef Breuer's treatment of Pappenheim is portrayed in When Nietzsche wept by Irvin D. Yalom.

=== Psychoanalysis ===
Her treatment is regarded as marking the beginning of psychoanalysis. Breuer observed that whilst she experienced 'absences' (a change of personality accompanied by confusion), she would mutter words or phrases to herself. In inducing her to a state of hypnosis, Breuer found that these words were "profoundly melancholy fantasies...sometimes characterized by poetic beauty". Free association came into being after Pappenheim decided (with Breuer's input) to end her hypnosis sessions and merely talk to Breuer, saying anything that came into her mind. She called this method of communication "chimney sweeping" and "talking cure" and this served as the beginning of free association.

Her case history, under the pseudonym Anna O., was described in Studies on Hysteria (Studien über Hysterie) in 1895, which Breuer published together with Freud. She is presented as the first case in which it was possible to "thoroughly investigate" hysteria and cause its symptoms to disappear. Her statement that being able to verbalize her problem helped her to unburden herself is in accordance with the treatment later denoted in psychoanalysis as the catharsis theory. Accordingly, Freud described her as the "actual founder of the psychoanalytic approach". Based on this case study the assertion that "those with hysteria suffer for the most part from their reminiscences", in other words from traumatic memories which can be "processed" by relating them, was formulated for the first time.

Freud wrote:

Breuer's findings are still today the foundation of psychoanalytic therapy. The statement that symptoms disappear with awareness of their unconscious preconditions has been confirmed by all subsequent research...

Freud specified psychoanalytic therapy, but not theory. Psychoanalysis did not come into being until The Interpretation of Dreams was written five years later.

== See also ==
- Conversion disorder
- Hypnoid state
- Somatic symptom disorder
- Sergei Pankejeff ("Wolf Man")
- Rat Man
- Herbert Graf ("Little Hans")
- Dora (case study)
