= Hannah Karminski =

German educator

Hannah Karminski (real name Minna Johanna Karminski; born April 24, 1897, in Berlin; died June 4, 1943, in Auschwitz-Birkenau) was a German educator, and an important contributor to the Jewish Women's League and the Reich Association of Jews in Germany. She helped many persecuted people to emigrate, and was murdered in the Holocaust.

== Life and work ==
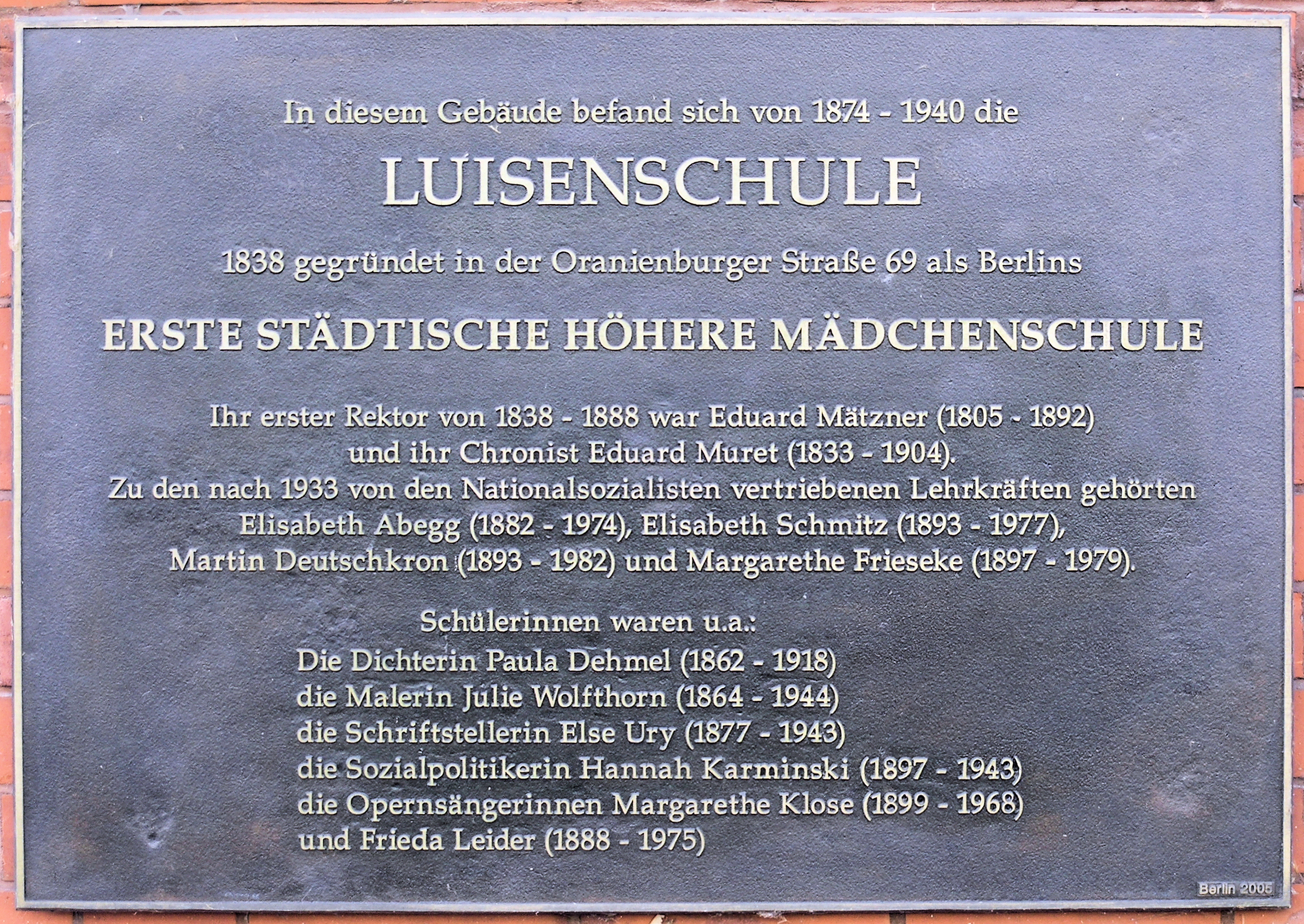
Memorial plaque at the house Ziegelstraße 12, in Berlin-Mitte

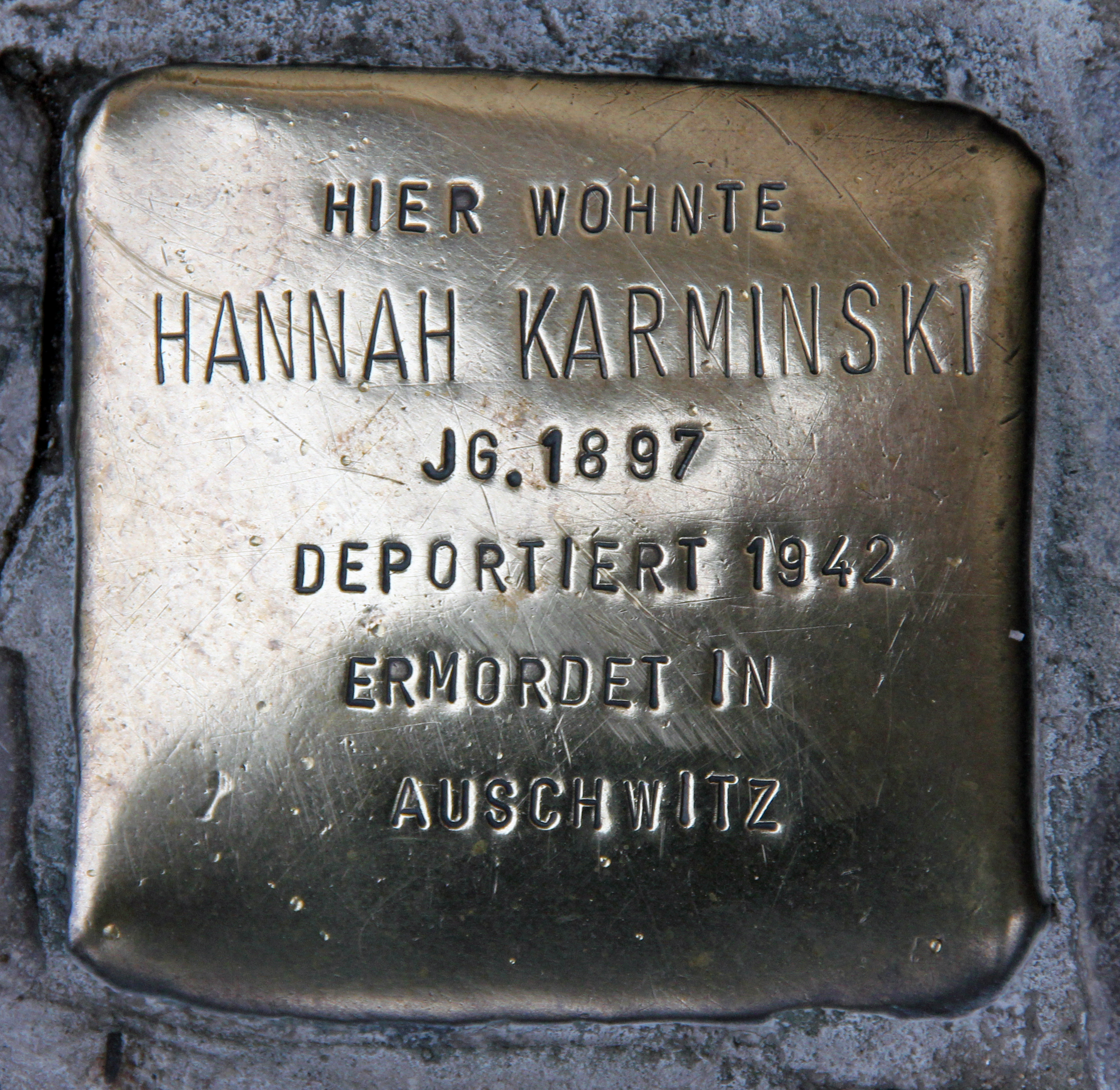
Stolperstein, Oranienburger Straße 22, in Berlin-Mitte

Hannah Karminski, daughter of the banker Adolf Abraham Karminski and his wife Selma, née Cohn, was born in her parents' apartment at 22 Oranienburger Strasse, in the Spandauer Vorstadt district of Berlin. After attending the Luisenschule, Hannah trained as a kindergarten teacher at the renowned Pestalozzi-Fröbel-Haus. She then worked for a short time in a Jewish kindergarten in Berlin, and subsequently attended the Social Pedagogical Institute in Hamburg, run by Gertrud Bäumer and Marie Baum, where she trained as a social worker. She took up her first post in Frankfurt am Main, as head of the Jewish Girls' Club there. Here, she came into contact with Bertha Pappenheim, who was almost 40 years her senior, and who won her over to the Jewish Women's League.

Around 1925, Hannah Karminski returned to Berlin, and took over the editorship of the Jüdischer Frauenbund's articles on the women's movement until 1938. An important concern of Hannah Karminski's was to assert, and develop, the education and occupation of adolescent Jewish women against the traditional image of the family, with the goal of their social equality.

== Nazi era ==
When, in April 1933, Jewish women were banned from kindergarten teachers' and nursery nurses' seminaries, Hannah Karminski helped create a Jewish seminary for the training of kindergarten teachers, nursery nurses, and child care workers.

On November 10, 1938, Hannah Karminski was arrested, but released after a few hours. From that day on, the Jüdischer Frauenbund's papers were banned. From 1939, after the forced dissolution of the Jewish Women's League, Hannah Karminski headed the welfare department, or later welfare and emigration counseling, within the Reich Association of Jews in Germany, which was forcibly merged by the Nazi authorities. She held this office until her deportation, helping thousands of people to emigrate, and, thus, saving them from imminent extermination. She personally accompanied children's transports to England, through which a total of about 10,000 Jewish children from Germany, Austria, and Czechoslovakia were saved.

In addition to her work for the Reichsvereinigung, Hannah Karminski taught in the Jewish Seminar for Kindergarten and After-School Teachers, which she co-founded, where she also occasionally had to give exams.

Until Bertha Pappenheim's death (1936), Hannah Karminski cared for her colleague and friend, and later took over her functions in the Women's Association. In the following years, she joined forces with the Montessori educator, head of the Theodor Herzl School, and school deputy at the Reichsvereinigung, Paula Fürst. Fürst was deported to Minsk on June 26, 1942, together with another friend, the economist Cora Berliner.

"Today is Paula's birthday. How may she spend it? Not even one's thoughts can be sent to a fixed point - and yet, she will feel them," she wrote in a letter in August 1942. Relatives in Switzerland persuaded her to leave Nazi Germany, but Hannah Karminski rejected all opportunities to emigrate herself or to escape illegally, out of a deep attachment to her humanitarian duties.

On December 9, 1942, Hannah Karminski - ill, with a high fever - was arrested and deported from Berlin to Auschwitz-Birkenau, with the 24th Osttransport, with over 1000 people. There, she was murdered on June 4, 1943.

== Honors ==
The city of Berlin has named Hannah-Karminski-Strasse in the Charlottenburg district after its former citizen.

== Writings (selection) ==
- Internationale jüdische Frauenarbeit. In: Der Morgen. Monatsschrift der Juden in Deutschland, 5 (1929) Nr. 3, S. 280–287. (Online, Jahrgang wählen)
- Berufsfragen für Mädchen [Rezension]. In: Der Morgen. Monatsschrift der Juden in Deutschland, 11 (1935) Nr. 5, S. 237. (ebenfalls online)
- Soziale Gesetzgebung. In: Vom jüdischen Geist: eine Aufsatzreihe. Hrsg. Jüdischer Frauenbund. Biko, Berlin 1934
- Jüdisch-religiöse Frauenkultur, in typischen Formen und Äußerungen, in Emmy Wolff Hg.: Frauengenerationen in Bildern. Herbig, Berlin 1928, S. 163–172.

== Literature (selection) ==
- Manfred Berger: Hannah Karminski. Der jüdischen Tradition verpflichtet. In: Berlin Aktuell. 2000/Nr. 66, S. 18–19
- Manfred Berger: Zum Gedenken des 100. Geburtstages der jüdischen Sozialarbeiterin Hannah Karminski. In: Unsere Jugend. Jg. 49 (1997) Nr. 4, S. 136.
- Manfred Berger: Führende Frauen in sozialer Verantwortung: Hannah Karminski, in: Christ und Bildung 2005/H. 1, S. 35
- Sabine Hering, Gudrun Maierhof: Hannah Karminski. In: Sozial Extra. Jg. 31 (2007) Nr. 3, S. 49. (Online-Version)
- Marion A. Kaplan: Die jüdische Frauenbewegung in Deutschland. Organisation und Ziele des Jüdischen Frauenbundes 1904–1938. Hamburg 1981, S. 148–150.
- Ursula Köhler-Lutterbeck, Monika Siedentopf: Lexikon der 1000 Frauen. Bonn 2000, S. 171–172. ISBN 3-8012-0276-3.
- Ernst G. Lowenthal: Bewährung im Untergang. Ein Gedenkbuch. DVA, Stuttgart 1966, S. 89–93.
- Gudrun Maierhof: Selbstbehauptung im Chaos. Frauen in der jüdischen Selbsthilfe 1933–1943. Frankfurt/New York 2002, S. 71–77, 193–195.
- Gudrun Maierhof: ‚Ich bleibe, um meine Pflicht zu tun‘. Hannah Karminski (1897–1942). In: Sabine Hering (Hrsg.): Jüdische Wohlfahrt im Spiegel von Biographien. Frankfurt/Main 2006, S. 220–228.
- Ludwig Romanoff: Jüdische Wohlfahrtspflege aufgezeigt am Beispiel ausgewählter Frauenbiografien (Cora Berliner, Clara Israel, Hannah Karminski, Hilde Lion, Bertha Pappenheim, Alice Salomon). Passau 2006, S. 83–126.
- Peter Reinicke: Karminski, Hannah, in: Hugo Maier (Hrsg.): Who is who der Sozialen Arbeit. Freiburg: Lambertus, 1998 ISBN 3-7841-1036-3, S. 289.

== See also ==
- The Holocaust
- Women's suffrage
- First-wave feminism
- History of the Jews in Germany
