= Anna Ettlinger =

German writer and poet (1841–1934)

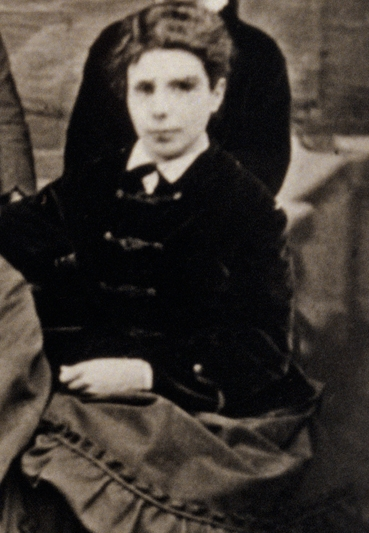
Anna Ettlinger

Anna Ettlinger (16 November 1841 – 17 February 1934) was a German writer and poet.

== Biography ==
Anna Ettlinger was born on 16 November 1841 in Karlsruhe, Baden-Württemberg, Germany. Her father, Veit Ettlinger was a respected lawyer. Her family was active in the cultural life of the town. Her parents' house was frequently visited by a number of musicians including Johannes Brahms and Hermann Levi.

Anna, along her sisters, sang in local choirs conducted by Brahms and Levi at Karlsruhe. She sang at the first performances of Schicksalslied, conducted by Brahms on 18 October 1871, and the Triumphlied, organized by Levi on 5 June 1872. At Levi's suggestion, she also wrote Melusine, an opera libretto in verse in 1871.

Her literary interest of becoming an author took the precedence over the marriage her family had planned for her. She played an important role in encouraging Bertha Pappenheim to write.

Her publications include Erinnerungen an Brahms und Levi and Lebenserinnerungen.

She died in Karlsruhe, Baden-Württemberg, Germany on 17 February 1934.
