= Marvin Lowenthal =

American writer and activist (1890-1969)

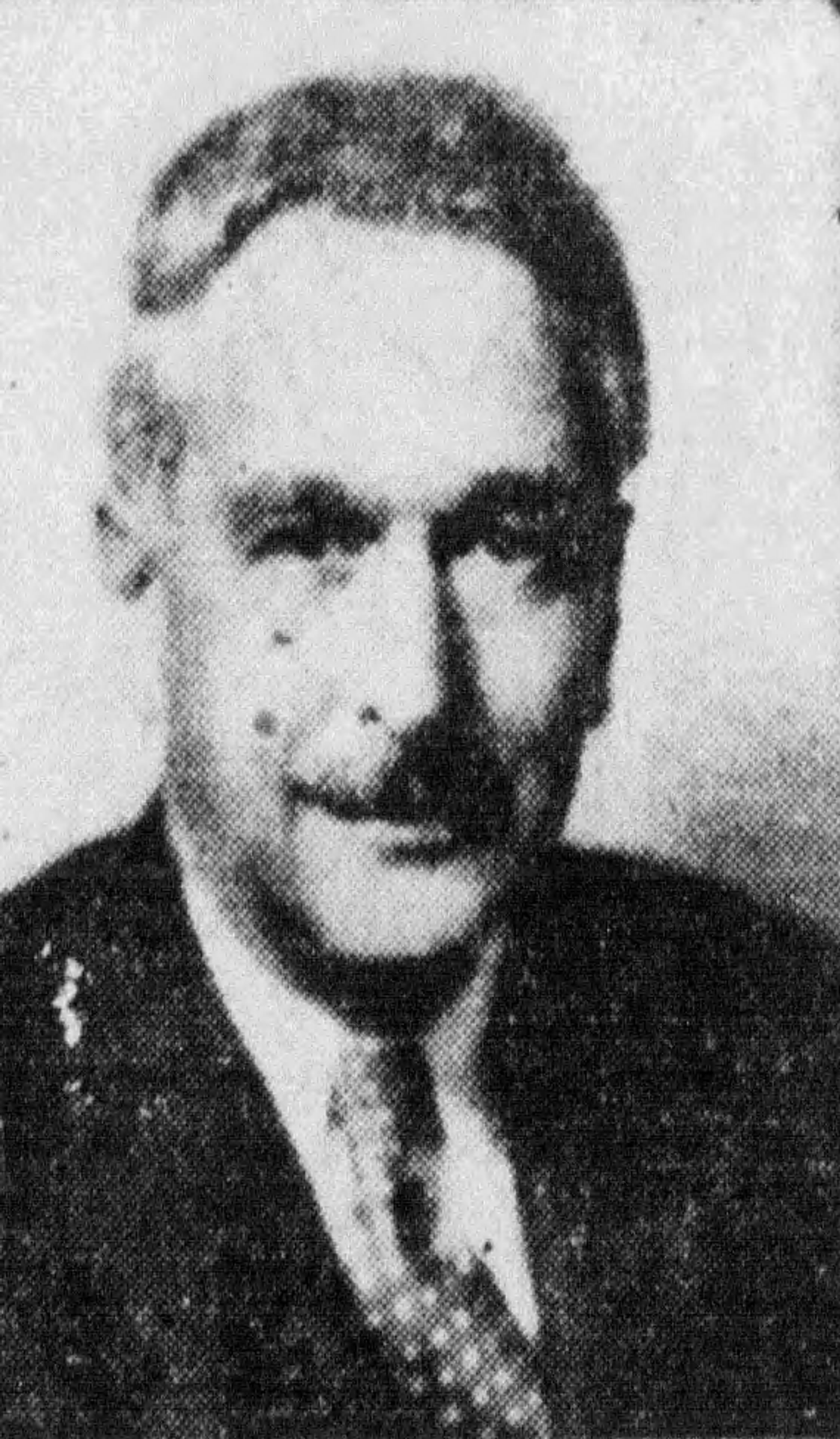
- Lowenthal c. 1940s
- Born: October 6, 1890; Bradford, Pennsylvania, U.S.
- Died: March 15, 1969 (aged 78); New York City, U.S.
- Education: University of Wisconsin at Madison; Harvard University
- Occupations: Writer; Zionist activist
- Employer: The Menorah Journal
- Spouse: Sylvia Mardfin

Marvin Marx Lowenthal (October 6, 1890 – March 15, 1969) was an American writer and activist. Originally an assistant superintendent at a local silk mill, he left to study at the University of Wisconsin at Madison, where Horace Kallen influenced him to go into Zionism. He joined the Zionist Organization of America, where he chaired the Zionist Bureau of the Pacific Coast, and was a journalist and editor for The Menorah Journal. He published several books related to history and Jewish studies, including The Jews of Germany (1936).

== Biography ==
Lowenthal was born on October 6, 1890 in Bradford, Pennsylvania; his parents were Pauline Marx and jeweler Louis S. Lowenthal and they were part of the city's Jewish Reform Temple. When he was 15, he was hired by a local silk mill as a bobbin boy, rising in the ranks for six years before finally becoming an assistant superintendent. Despite his trade job, he had a passion for writing, having sold a short story that he wrote to the magazine Stage when he was 14 and won first place at a Menorah Society essay content. He left his old workplace to become a university student, and obtained a BA in 1915 at the University of Wisconsin at Madison.

While Lowenthal had an initial apathy towards Jewish culture and history, this changed when Horace Kallen, a philosophy professor at UW, inspired him to specialize in Zionism and eventually study at Harvard University for a master's degree in philosophy, eventually obtaining it in 1916. He joined The Menorah Journal as a regular contributor in 1915, before becoming a part-time editor with them; he served as associate and foreign editor from 1921 until 1930. He joined the Zionist Organization of America and at the invitation of Louis Brandeis, moved to San Francisco to become head of the Zionist Bureau of the Pacific Coast, before serving in the ZOA's New York chapter in 1919. He also served as secretary for the World Conference for International Peace through Religion, as well as a representative for the American Jewish Congress.

As a journalist, Lowenthal started writing about Jewish culture and travelled for assignments or as a League of Nations representative for Jewish interests. While in Europe, he witnessed the rise of fascism in the continent, particularly the Nazi Party's threat to Jewish people. Despite fleeing the continent in 1923 due to antisemitism, Lowenthal returned to Paris the next year because he "felt too far away from the subject he cared about".

After publishing a 1932 translation of Memoirs of Glückel of Hameln, a 1933 book called A World Passed By, and a 1935 edited essay volume called The Autobiography of Michel de Montaigne, Lowenthal published The Jews of Germany in 1936. Following the Nuremberg Laws and the start of World War II, Lowenthal revisited Zionism and published The Life and Letters of Henrietta Szold (1942). He and Frank Monaghan co-authored a 1943 book called This Was New York: The Nation's Capital in 1789; Susanne Klingenstein said it was "clearly designed to instill Americans with a sense of pride in their country" amidst the country's involvement in the war. In addition to Jewish history and Zionism, he was "equally at home in ... American literature and French literature", and often was a critic and lecturer on these topics.

Following the end of World War II, Lowenthal continued his involvement in Zionism as Israel became independent, being part of the Zionist Advisory Committee from 1946 to 1949. He was editor for the American Zionist from 1952 to 1954, and published another edited volume, The Diaries of Theodore Herzl, in 1956. He also worked at the Brandeis University Library, where he was director of special studies in 1956.

Lowenthal married Sylvia Mardfin in 1918. At the time of his death, Lowenthal lived at 165 West 91st Street in the Upper West Side.

Lowenthal died on March 15, 1969, aged 78, while hospitalized at Montefiore Einstein Medical Center in the Bronx following an illness.
