= Rosenheim (surname) =

Rosenheim is a surnamed derived from the town of Rosenheim, Bavaria. It is largely a Jewish surname. Notable individuals with the surname include:

- Alfred Rosenheim (1859–1943), American architect
- Arthur Rosenheim (1865–1942), German chemist
- Jacob Rosenheim (1870–1965), German-born Israeli publisher
- Jens Toller Rosenheim (1636–1690), Norwegian nobleman
- Käte Rosenheim (1892–1979), German-American social worker who rescued children from Nazi Germany
- Max Rosenheim (1908–1972), British physician
- Mikhail Rosenheim (1820–1887), Russian poet and translator
- Otto Rosenheim (1871–1955), German-born English biochemist
