= The Jews of Germany =

1936 book by Marvin Lowenthal

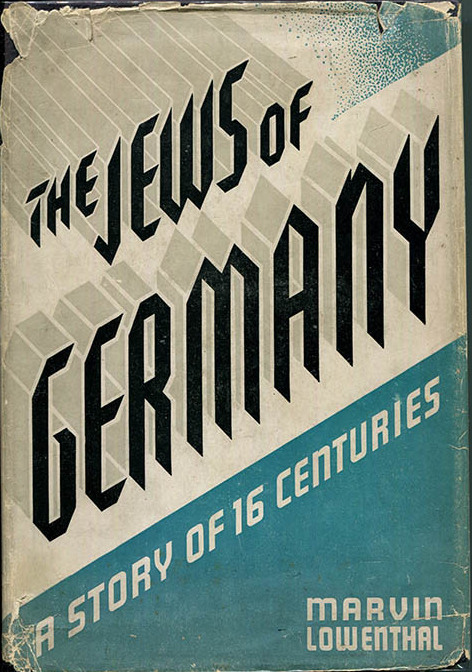
- Author: Marvin Lowenthal
- Language: English
- Subject: History of the Jews in Germany
- Published: 1936
- Publisher: Jewish Publication Society
- Pages: 443
- OCLC: 181395

The Jews of Germany: A Story of Sixteen Centuries is a 1936 book by Marvin Lowenthal, dividing the entire history of the Jews in Germany up to publication into four "book" sections. Lowenthal wrote the book after witnessing the rise of fascism and antisemitism while on duty in Europe as a journalist. It received praise for its accessibility and accuracy but drew mixed reception over its arguments and scope.

== Contents ==
The Jews of Germany encompasses the history of the Jews in Germany from 321 AD until the time of publication, in total sixteen centuries. The Jews of Germany is divided into four sections referred to as "books": the first extends a millennium from the Roman era to the First Crusade; the second is about the Middle Ages' religious conflict between Christianity and Judaism; and the third and fourth centered on the Reformation-era socioeconomic enfranchisement of Jews and the subsequent rise in antisemitism, respectively. In the conclusion, the National Socialist Program is found to have only its racially-motivated points fulfilled in practice, to the disadvantage of German Jews. Despite the name being centered on German Jews, the book effectively covers several historical events affecting Jews in general, including the impact of Roman and Islamic rule, the Crusades, or medieval political changes.

Throughout the book, several root causes behind the contemporary rise of antisemitism are explored including: forgeries such as The Protocols of the Elders of Zion and about Walther Rathenau, as well as the actions and statements of Hitler's Nazi movement. Littlefield remarked that in writing this book, Lowenthal had "rekindled the academic torch dropped by" Lucien Wolf, another writer interested in Jewish affairs. Lowenthal argues in the book that a new government that tolerates liberty must replace the one in Nazi Germany, equating the latter to death, and concludes that "the liberty of no individual can rise higher than its source; and this source is the general liberty of man".

== Background and release ==
While on duty in Europe, American journalist Marvin Lowenthal witnessed the rise of fascism and antisemitism throughout the continent - particularly the German Nazi Party - writing to a friend that there was an "atmosphere so thick with hatred against the Jews". Following Adolf Hitler's rise to power, he followed the developments surrounding the party's treatment of the Jews, including the 1935 enactment of the antisemitic Nuremberg Laws. By 1936, antisemitism's "bibliography in exposition, justification, condemnation [was according to Littlefield] one of the largest in the world".

Certain that their history "was rapidly coming to an end" with Nazi Germany's antisemitic regime, he subsequently started work on a book on German Jews; according to Klingenstein, the book was "his most painful work" on these grounds. It was reportedly claimed by its publisher to be the "first complete work on the subject in any language".

The Jews of Germany was published by the Jewish Publication Society in 1936. There are 443 pages in the book, as well as a bibliography. In 1970, Russell & Russell released a hardcover reprint of the book.

== Reception ==
Bourne described The Jews of Germany as "impressive", remarking that it provided "the clearest, most complete and most dispassionate explanation" of European antisemitism. Solomon Grayzel drew comparisons to Ismar Elbogen's Geschichte der Juden in Deutschland, another history book on German Jews, released the year before; he remarked that both books are centered more on the impact of broader German history than with internal Jewish life and praised them for their accessibility and comprehensivity. Littlefield praised it as "the wisest contribution so far made to" the study of Nazi Germany at the time, citing its ability to make Jewish history understandable to the general audience. Werthan showed mixed reservations about the inclusion of non-Jewish German history, calling it "superfluous, perhaps to the student, but necessary to the layman for whom this book is written".

Littlefield raised doubts about The Jews of Germany's argument that Europe's antisemitism was political and driven by xenophobia by explaining that that Jewish emancipation played against the existence of the ghetto and that German Jews were an influential part of the country. Conversely, Grayzel praised the book's criticism of Jewish assimilation for the near-accurate nature of its historical basis. Werthan praised the book for being written by a more experienced writer than one who "might have confused historical fact with his own feelings in the matter".

Retrospectively, Klingenstein said The Jews of Germany was Lowenthal's "most important book".
