= League of Jewish Women (Germany) =

Organization founded in 1904

The League of Jewish Women in Germany (German: Jüdischer Frauenbund, JFB) was founded in 1904 by Bertha Pappenheim. Pappenheim led the JFB throughout the first twenty years of its existence, and remained active in it until her death in 1936. The JFB became increasingly popular through the 20th century. At its peak in 1928, the organization had 50,000 members from 34 local branches and 430 subsidiary groups. At the time, the JFB was Germany's third largest Jewish organization, with 15–20% of Jewish women in Germany becoming members.

== Growth out of the Women's Movement ==
The JFB followed the 1899 founding of the German Evangelical Women's Association (German: Deutsch-Evangelischer Frauenbund), as well as the founding in 1903 of the German Catholic Women's Association (German: Katholischer Frauenbund). It was the part of the period of activity some call "First-wave feminism", in which women in some countries, including Germany, led movements aimed to increase women's rights. The foundation of the JFB shaped a distinct movement situated at the intersection of German society and Jewish tradition. From 1907 the JFB was a member of the Union of German Feminist Organizations (German: Bund Deutscher Frauenvereine, BDF), which had been developed as an umbrella organization for the various women's associations.

== Goals and work ==
The JFB was a community with a primary interest of improving women's experiences in the Jewish community. It was open about its desire to bring women into closer contact with Jewish tradition. Many members of the organization came from relatively assimilated Jewish families who had drifted far from tradition, and some were encouraged by their husbands to further conceal their Jewish identities. Some of these women reacted by developing a feminist practice of tzedakah, or the charitable giving mandated by Jewish law. The philanthropic contributions from local women's organizations supported centralized social outreach as well as the maintenance of relationships with international collaborators. This work led to the founding of the Central Office for the Welfare of Jews in Germany (ZWSt) in 1917. The organization, particularly in its early years, focused on fighting for women's right to vote within the Jewish community. The organization made combating antisemitism a main priority, even though it put less emphasis on the issue as many Jewish men's groups. The JFB provided social and educational resources for Jewish women and strove to end what was defined as "female slavery", prostitution, and moral degradation in Germany and abroad. Pappenheim traveled to Eastern Europe on various occasions, which motivated her to push the organization toward combating prostitution and improving the lives of Jewish women in Eastern Europe. The JFB shifted its efforts away from helping Jewish women abroad at the outbreak of World War I. After World War I, JFB struggled to appeal to younger Jewish women, and mainly prioritized Jewish issues over feminist issues.

== Role during World War I ==
The JFB, like many other woman's organization in the BDF (German: Bund Deutscher Frauenvereine), mobilized to assist the war effort on the home front. The JFB collaborated with the Red Cross to provide first aid services on the home front as well as in military hospitals. The JFB also helped support wives and families of soldiers who died in the war.

== Members ==
- Paula Ollendorff
- Käte Rosenheim
- Rahel Straus
- Margarete Tietz
