= Triumphlied =

Choral composition by Johannes Brahms

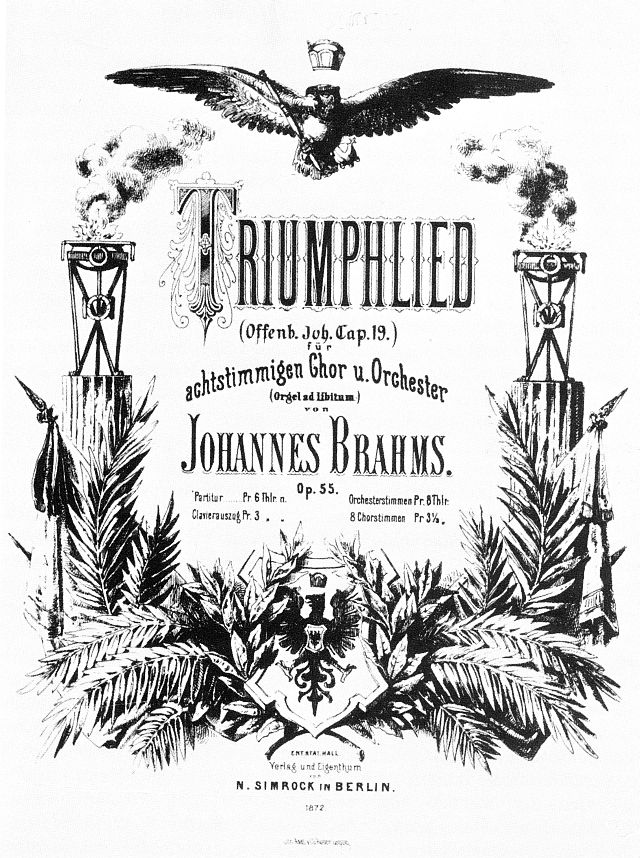
Title page of the score, published by N. Simrock

The Triumphlied (Op. 55) is a work for baritone solo, choir and orchestra by the German composer Johannes Brahms. Brahms wrote the work on the occasion of the German victory in the Franco-Prussian War and dedicated it to emperor Wilhelm I. The text itself emanates from the Book of Revelation predicting the downfall of Babylon but is consciously reinterpreted into political terms. It premiered on 5 June 1872 in Karlsruhe. Due to its patriotic message bound to the zeitgeist of the Unification of Germany, the Triumphlied lost popularity after World War I, despite its musical quality. Today it is one of Brahms's rather unknown œuvres.

== History ==
Brahms began the composition in autumn of 1870 under the impression of German victories during the Franco-Prussian War. The first part was finished after the proclamation of Wilhelm I as emperor. The second and third part were composed after the conclusion of a peace treaty in summer of 1871. The first print of the Triumphlied was published in 1872. It was dedicated to "His Majesty the German Emperor Wilhelm I reverentially devoted by the composer". Originally Brahms, who admired Otto von Bismarck, had intended to dedicate the work to both the emperor and the chancellor exalting the "victory of German arms".

== Scoring and structure ==
The Triumphlied is scored for choir (8 parts), baritone solo and orchestra. The orchestra includes 2 flutes, 2 oboes, 2 clarinets, 2 bassoons, 1 contrabassoon, 4 horns, 3 trumpets, 3 trombones, tuba, timpanis and strings. An organ may be included ad libitum.

1. Halleluja! Heil und Preis (Lebhaft und feierlich)
2. Lobet unsern Gott (Mäßig belebt)
3. Und ich sah den Himmel aufgetan (Lebhaft)

Performed, the work takes between 22 and 26 minutes.

=== First movement ===
Halleluja! Heil und Preis, Ehre und Kraft sei Gott unserm Herrn. Denn wahrhaftig und gerecht sind seine Gerichte. Halleluja! —
"Alleluia; Salvation, and glory, and honour, and power, unto the Lord our God. For true and righteous are his judgments. Alleluia!" (Revelation 19:2)

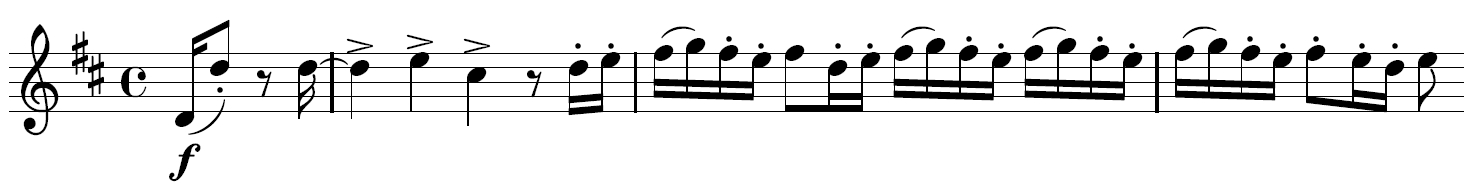
Beginning of the introduction, quoting the beginning of "Heil dir im Siegerkranz"

The movement is marked as "Lebhaft und feierlich" (Lively and festive). The main theme of the first movement is a motivic echo of "Heil dir im Siegerkranz", the unofficial national anthem of the German Empire. Although Brahms only set the first words of Revelations chapter 19 ("For true and righteous are his judgments") to music, the continuation of the biblical text ("For he has judged the great prostitute") — referring to Paris — are, however, insinuated in the music which is testified by a handwritten note on Brahms's copy of the score.

=== Second movement ===
Lobet unsern Gott, alle seine Knechte, und die ihn fürchten, beide, Kleine und Große. Halleluja! Denn der allmächtige Gott hat das Reich eingenommen. Lasset uns freuen und fröhlich sein, und ihm die Ehre geben. —
"Praise our God, all ye his servants, and ye that fear him, both small and great. Alleluia: for the Lord God omnipotent reigneth. Let us be glad and rejoice, and give honour to him." (Revelation 19:5b,6b,7a)

The second movement, moderately animated, starts in G major and consists of three parts. The choir is used in an antiphonal way. In the third part of this movement, Brahms incorporated the famous hymn "Nun danket alle Gott".

=== Third movement ===
Und ich sahe den Himmel aufgetan. Und siehe, ein weißes Pferd, und der darauf saß, hieß: Treu und Wahrhaftig, und richtet und streitet mit Gerechtigkeit. Und er tritt die Kelter des Weins des grimmigen Zorns des allmächtigen Gottes. Und hat einen Namen geschrieben auf seinem Kleide, und auf seiner Hüfte, also: Ein König aller Könige, und ein Herr aller Herrn. Halleluja. Amen! —
"And I saw heaven opened, and behold a white horse; and he that sat upon him was called Faithful and True, and in righteousness he doth judge and make war. And he treadeth the winepress of the fierceness and wrath of Almighty God. And he hath on his vesture and on his thigh a name written, King of Kings, and Lord of Lords. Alleluia. Amen!" (Revelation 19:11,15b,16)

Also consisting of three parts, the last movement begins in D minor and ends in D major.

== Premiere and publication ==
The premiere of the first part took place on 7 April 1871 on the occasion of the Good Friday concert "In Memory of those who fell in Battle" in the cathedral of Bremen. The newspaper Weser-Zeitung wrote that the first part of the Triumphlied was a "real paean", "worthy of a great nation". The first performance of the complete work took place on 5 June 1872 in Karlsruhe.

It was published by N. Simrock.

== Literature ==
- Daniel Beller-McKenna: Brahms and the German spirit. Harvard Univ. Press, Cambridge, Mass. u.a., 2004, ISBN 9780674013186, p. 98-132.
- Klaus Häfner: Das „Triumphlied“ op. 55, eine vergessene Komposition von Johannes Brahms. In: Badische Landesbibliothek Karlsruhe (Hrsg.): Johannes Brahms in Baden-Baden und Karlsruhe, Ausstellungskatalog, Selbstverlag der Bad. Landesbib. Karlsruhe, 1983, ISBN 3-88705-008-8, p. 83-102.
