= Rahel Straus =

German-Jewish medical doctor and feminist

- רחל שטראוס
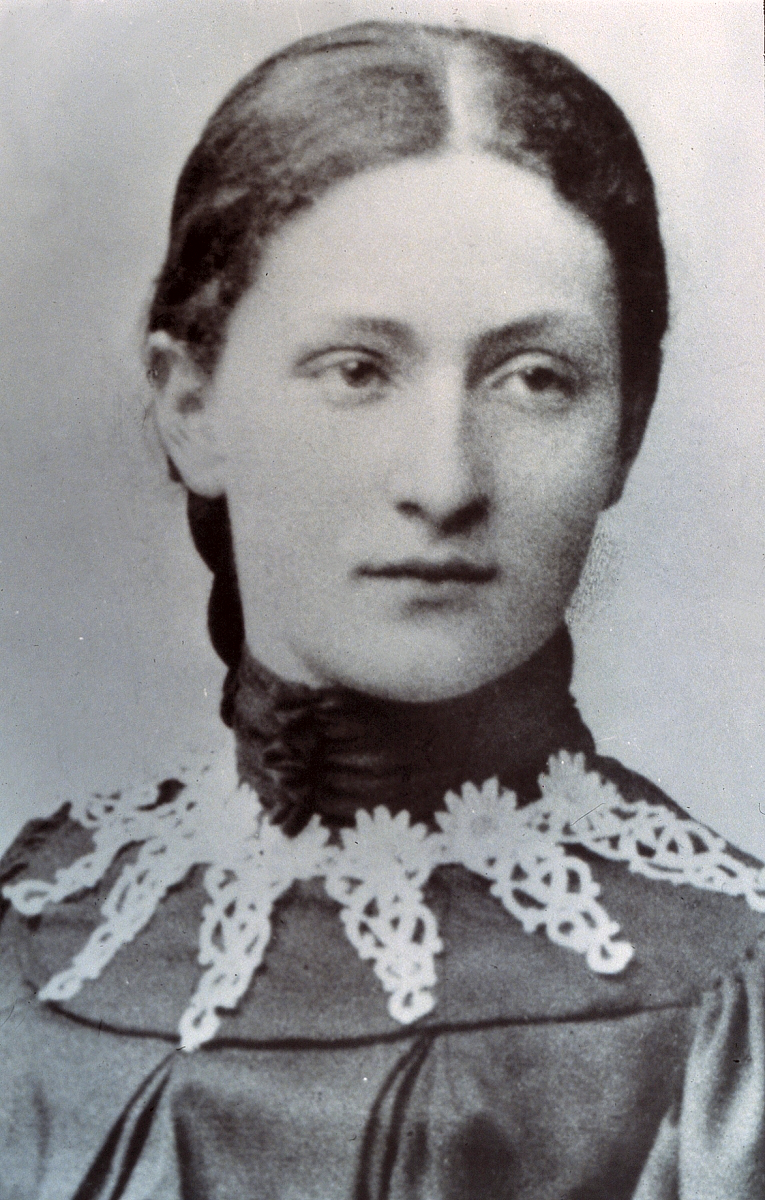
- Rahel Straus (1905)
- Born: Rahel Goitein; March 21, 1880; Karlsruhe, German Empire
- Died: May 15, 1963 (aged 83); Jerusalem, Israel
- Education: Heidelberg University
- Occupations: Medical doctor, feminist, writer
- Known for: First female medical student at Heidelberg University, Zionist activism, feminist activities
- Spouse: Elias Straus
- Children: Isa, Hannah, Frederic, Gabriele, Ernst

Rahel Straus née Goitein (Hebrew: רחל שטראוס; 1880–1963) was a pioneering German-Jewish medical doctor, feminist and writer. She was the first normal female student of medicine at Heidelberg University, graduating in January 1905. After marrying her childhood friend, the lawyer Elias Straus (1878–1933), she moved with him to Munich where she opened a medical practice and became an important figure in support of Zionism and the League of Jewish Women. After her husband's death in 1933, she emigrated to Palestine with her four teenage children. There, she continued to practice medicine until 1940 when she retired to devote her time to activities in support of women, especially young immigrants. In 1952, she was a co-founder and active member of the Israeli branch of the Women's International League for Peace and Freedom.

== Biography ==
Born on 21 March 1880 in Karlsruhe, Rahel Goitein was the daughter of Gabor Goitein (1848–1883), an Orthodox rabbi from Hungary, and Ida Löwenfeld (1848–1931), a schoolteacher. After her father died when she was three years old, she was raised by her mother. Thanks to her matriculation in 1899 from Germany's first gymnasium for girls, she became the first regular female student at the University of Heidelberg. She graduated from the medical faculty in January 1905, her degree enabling her to practice anywhere in Germany.

Immediately after graduating, she married her childhood friend, the lawyer Elias Straus and moved with him to Munich. Together they had five children: Isa (1909), Hannah (1912), Frederic (1914), Gabriele (1915) and Ernst (1922), all of whom she brought up in a traditionally Jewish home. As a general practitioner and a gynaecologist, from 1908 she ran her own medical practice for some 25 years, attending principally to women and children.

In Munich, Straus became active in various Zionist and women's groups including the League of Jewish Women and the Women's International Zionist Organization. She contributed articles to Jewish journals and edited Blätter des Jüdischen Frauenbundes für Frauenarbeit und Frauenbewegung. Their Munich home became a meeting point for the Jewish elite including Albert Einstein, Martin Buber and Judah Leon Magnes.

Following her husband's death from cancer in June 1933, Straus realized she could no longer remain in Germany where she was increasingly threatened by the Nazis. The following November, she emigrated to Palestine with her children. There she established a medical practice but retired in 1940 to participate in social activities. After the establishment of the state of Israel, her efforts extended to training young female immigrants, distributing clothing to the needy and creating a workshop for rehabilitating handicapped women. She established the AKIM training institute for disabled children in Jerusalem, now known as Beit Rahel Straus. In 1952 she helped to establish the Israeli branch of the Women's International League for Peace and Freedom, remaining an active honorary member for the rest of her life.

In later life she wrote her memoirs, covering life in Germany before the Nazis came to power. She also published children's fairy tales in Hebrew. Rahel Straus died in Jerusalem on 15 May 1963, aged 83.

== Publications ==
- Straus, Rahel (1961). Wir lebten in Deutschland : Erinnerungen einer deutschen Jüdin, 1880-1933 / Rahel Straus herausgegeben und mit einem Nachwort versehen von Max Kreutzberger. Stuttgart: DVA. ISBN 3-379-01423-0.
