= History of the Jews in Hamburg =

The history of the Jews in Hamburg in Germany is recorded from at least 1590 on. Since the 1880s, Jews of Hamburg have lived primarily in the neighbourhoods of Grindel, earlier in the New Town, where the Sephardic Community "Neveh Shalom" (Hebrew: נוה שלום) was established in 1652. Since 1612 there have been toleration agreements with the senate of the prevailingly Lutheran city-state. Also Reformed Dutch merchants and Anglican Britons made similar agreements before. In these agreements the Jews were not permitted to live in the Inner-City, though were also not required to live in ghettos.

From 1600 onwards, also German Jews settled in Hamburg, but in 1649 these Ashkenazim were driven out of the city-state. From then on, only Sephardim were permitted to live in Hamburg. Ashkenazi Jews returned to Hamburg in 1656.

Around 1925, about 20,000 Jews lived in Hamburg, of whom about 400 were Sephardim. After the Nazis had come to power, most synagogues were destroyed in 1938 and 1939 and soon the associated communities also were dissolved. In 1945, a Jewish community was founded by survivors of the Shoah. And finally in 1960 the new Synagogue on "Hohe Weide" street was built. In the 1970s about 1,000 immigrant Jewish Iranians joined the congregation.

== Origins ==
The Jewish Community in Hamburg, began with the establishment of Sephardim from Spain, as they were expelled from their home country in 1492, they came through stopovers in Portugal, Amsterdam and Antwerp arriving around 1577. Before the destruction of the Jewish community by the Nazis, the Grindel, Harvestehude and Eimsbüttel were centres of Jewish life in Hamburg. There were several synagogues, the most famous were the "Neue Dammtorsynagoge" (1895), the "Bornplatzsynagoge" (1906) and the new Temple on Oberstrasse (1931).

== Sephardic Jews ==
Notable Sephardim in Hamburg include Duarte Nunes da Costa (alias Jacob Curiel) (1587-1665), Agent of the Spanish and later, Agent of the Portuguese Crown in Hamburg, and ennobled by Joao IV of Portugal on 14 June 1641. Son of the eminent physician Abraham Curiel.

== Ashkenazim ==
In 1710 an imperial commission, which visited the town for the purpose of making peace between the senate and the aldermen, fixed the position of Hamburg's Ashkenazim and Sephardim by certain regulations (Reglement der Judenschaft in Hamburg sowohl portugiesischer als hochdeutscher Nation, lit. Regulation of the Jewry of Portuguese as well as of High German Nation in Hamburg), promulgated in the name of Emperor Joseph I. This edict became the fundamental law for the treatment of Jews in Hamburg during the ensuing century.

== Jewish community in Altona ==
Different regulations applied to Sephardim and Ashkenazim in Altona which — unlike its easterly adjacent imperially free city-state and republic of Hamburg — formed part of a non-constitutional monarchy, the county of Holstein-Pinneberg.

In 1584 Count Adolphus XI of Holstein-Pinneberg and Schauenburg granted individual staying permits (Partikulargeleit, i.e. particular escort) for Altona and the neighbouring village of Ottensen to four families who are the first Ashkenazi Schutzjuden recorded for Altona. The Senate of Hamburg, the city-state's government, granted no such permissions to Ashkenazim, nevertheless, by 1610 some Ashkenazim had managed to factually live in Hamburg, however, not in households of their own, but in those of their employers, usually established Sephardim of Hamburg. However, as a member of someone else's household founding an own family was forbidden and one's stay depended on the employment. In 1611 two other families were permitted to settle in Altona, with their writs of permission mentioning four Ashkenazi families already living there.

In 1612 Altona's Ashkenazim managed to negotiate with the comital government staying permissions for them as a community (Generalgeleit, i.e. general escort, a general privilege), not as individuals, and thus the community arranged the reception of more Ashkenazim increasing their number to 30 families in 1622. The Ashkenazim established under the general privilege a fully fledged qehillah, the Hochdeutsche Israeliten-Gemeinde zu Altona (i.e. High German Israelite community/congregation at Altona), with elected council, agreeing religious taxes to finance teaching, miqve, cemetery and synagogue.

In the adjacent Lutheran city-state of Hamburg Sephardim enjoyed a certain protection within the framework of her contracts with communities of foreign merchants of non-Lutheran faith such as Calvinist Reformed Dutchmen, Anglican Englishmen, or Catholic French with the Senate of Hamburg. In this context Hamburg had received the Sephardim in 1590 as the natio lusitana (as supposed Catholic Portuguese), with both parties tacitly overlooking their Jewishness in the beginning. So as their residence, only few Sephardim chose Altona.

The senate and other republican bodies (Hamburg's aldermen, Lutheran elders [Oberalte], commercial deputation etc.), ruled the city-state in a system of checks and balances. In 1603 some aldermen complained to the senate that the Portuguese were actually Sephardim, with the senate ignoring that, and after a repeated complaint in 1604 the senate pretended in its response, it had no indication for that assumption. However, with the ongoing anti-Judaic debate in the republic's legislative and ruling bodies, the senate denied Hamburg's Sephardim to buy land for a cemetery within the city-state territory.

So in 1611 Hamburg's Sephardim acquired land from Count Ernest for their cemetery just 1,300 metres beyond Hamburg's state border on Altona's today's Königstraße, which was used until 1871 when it ran out of space. In 1612 Count Ernest sold an adjacent plot to Altona's Ashkenazim for their cemetery. After the senate had obtained the expert opinion of Viadrina's faculty of Lutheran theology on 29 August 1611 that tolerating Portuguese Jews was "paternal and Christian" as is the continuation of this practice, the senate rejected the criticism by aldermen. On 19 February 1612 the senate concluded the Designatio Articulorum, darauf sich E. E. Rath mit der portugiesischen Nation verglichen und dieselben in Schutz und Schirm genommen with the Sephardim as a recognised and protected corporation of persons. However, of the Ashkenazim indeed living in Hamburg, where they only received legal recognition in 1710, many tried to secure legal protection of the Danish crown in case of any attempt to expel them from Hamburg.

So besides the legally recognised Hochdeutsche Israeliten-Gemeinde zu Altona there lived many Ashkenaszim in Altona who made no use of its premises and services because they were members of Hamburg's Ashkenazi congregation. As Hamburg's Sephardim called the city's Ashkenazim in Portuguese as Tudescos (Germans), the latter styled their congregation as Deutsch-Israelitische Gemeinde zu Hamburg (lit. German Israelite Community at Hamburg; est. 1661/1662). In Altona the conditions of residence were favorable, in Hamburg the conditions for business. These were the reasons for the genesis of a branch community of Hamburg's Ashkenazi congregation in Altona. A similar development took place in Hamburg's eastern neighbour, the Danish-Holsteinian city of Wandsbek where Ashkenazim from Hamburg used to live, or at least used to be legal residents there, whereas their religious affiliation was with the Deutsch-Israelitische Gemeinde zu Hamburg. In the 17th and early 18th century the Deutsch-Israelitische Gemeinde zu Hamburg had more members officially residing and occasionally factually living in Altona or Wandsbek than in Hamburg proper.

Thanks to immigration from the central eastern Europe, Altona's Ashkenzi congregation became a center of research and scholarship in Jewish teaching (e.g. Jonathan Eybeschütz, Jacob Emden), attracting hundreds of students. The officially recognised Beth Din had a reputation as one of the most distinguished in the whole Jewish world. No wonder that the three Ashkenazi congregations, anyway intertwined by members of Hamburg's Deutsch-Israelitische Gemeinde spending their working hours and many a night intown, although officially residing and occasionally actually living in Altona and Wandsbek, established a close coöperation in 1671. Their overwhelming umbrella was styled Dreigemeinde AH"U (Hebrew: אה"ו; i.e. tri-community AH"U, derived from the Hebrew acronym of the initials of Altona, Hamburg, and Wandsbek) led by Altona's Hochdeutsche Israeliten-Gemeinde, the most renowned and legally best protected of the three. However, the tri-community was no merger, then legally impossible across state borders. The Altona rabbinate was recognised as the chief rabbinate for the tri-community umbrella and all of Holstein.

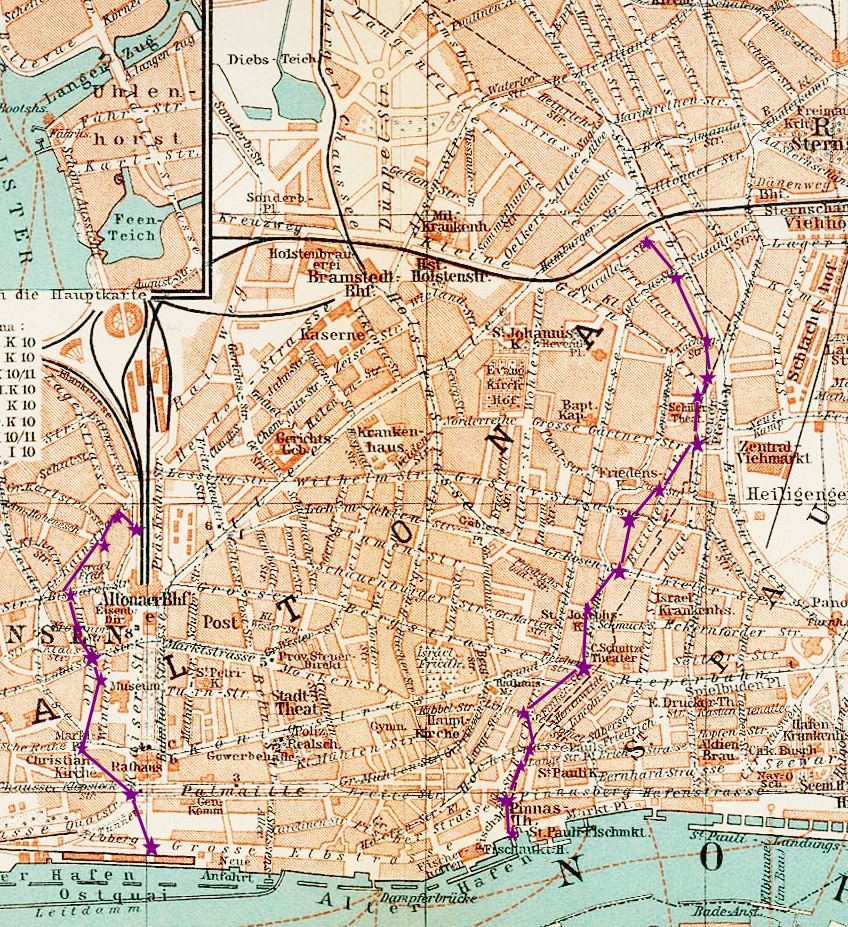
1910 map of Altona depicting in purple the posts and wires of the eruv

A general privilege expired with the rulers' deaths and thus Adolphus' successors Ernest, Jobst Herman and Otto V all confirmed it. Following the county's integration in 1640 into the German Duchy of Holstein-Glückstadt, ruled in personal union by the kings of Denmark–Norway, on 1 August 1641 King Christian IV had formally reconfirmed the Ashkenazim their general privilege including their cemetery and a synagogue, thus continuing the basis for the existence of their community. By the end of the 17th century the Hochdeutsche Israeliten-Gemeinde established the Altona Eruv, maintained until the 1930s, when on 1 January 1938 Altona's Hochdeutsche Israeliten-Gemeinde merged with the Ashkenazi congregations of Hamburg (Deutsch-Israelitische Gemeinde zu Hamburg), of Harburg-Wilhelmsburg (Synagogengemeinde Harburg) and of Wandsbek (Israelitische Gemeinde zu Wandsbek), following the incorporation of the smaller cities into the by far larger Hamburg by way of the Greater Hamburg Act of 1937.

In 1697 the freedom of religious practice which Hamburg's Sephardic congregation had obtained was disturbed by hostile edicts of the aldermen, and Jews were extortionately taxed (Cf. Taxes on the Jews in Altona and Hamburg). On this account many of the rich and important Sephardim left Hamburg, some of them laying the foundation of the Portuguese congregation of Altona. The number of Sephardim in Altona only then reached the critical number to form congregations, first known as Beit Yacob ha-Katan (Hebrew: בית יעקב הקטן). In 1770 they founded the Holy Community of Neveh Shalom (Hebrew: נוה שלום), making Altona — within the area which later became Germany — one of the few places where Sephardic communities ever established, besides Emden, Glückstadt, Hamburg, Stade and Wandsbek. Altona's Sephardim, like all Jews of Danish-ruled Holstein, gained legal equality on 14 July 1863 through an act of the Danish-Holsteinian government. In 1887, Altona had become part of Prussia in 1867, the few remaining Sephardic congregants had to dissolve their community due to lack of members.

After in 1811 the First French Empire had annexed Hamburg, French centralist authorities forbade any coöperation beyond France's borders thus terminating the tri-community. Under French rule the Jews in Hamburg were emancipated, residence restrictions were dropped, and so many previously commuting Hamburg Jews took permanent residence in Hamburg proper. Joseph Carlebach served as chief rabbi of the Hochdeutsche Israeliten-Gemeinde in Altona between 1925 and 1936, when he changed as rabbi to the Deutsch-Israelitische Gemeinde in Hamburg.

== Haskalah / Jewish emancipation ==
Approximately 6,500 Jews lived in Hamburg in 1800. Thus, they represented a share of six percent of the city's total population. This was the largest Jewish community in the area which would later become Germany. After in 1811 the First French Empire had annexed Hamburg, now called Hambourg, already suffering three French occupations since 1806, all Hamburgers became French citizens of equal rights. Thus residence restrictions on Jews had disappeared and many Hamburg Jews previously commuting in and out from and to Altona and Wandsbek took permanent residence in Hamburg proper. The Holy Community of the Sephardim of Beit Israel and the Ashkenazi Deutsch-Israelitische Gemeinde zu Hamburg became subject to the Israelite Central Consistory of France. French centralist authorities forbade any coöperation beyond France's borders thus terminating the 1671-founded cross-border joint Ashkenazi tri-community umbrella Altona-Hamburg-Wandsbek (Hebrew: אה"ו; German: Dreigemeinde AH"U), previously combining the three Ashkenazi congregations of Altona (est. 1612), Hamburg and Wandsbek (est. 1637, but recognised in 1671 only), both in Holstein. Hamburg's Ashkenazim and Sephardim each retained separate congregations, the Altona Ashkenazim retaining their own rabbinate which was also recognised by the Jews of Wandsbek until 1864 and all of Holstein.

In 1814 Hamburg resumed independence and sovereignty as a city-state, and in the following year the senate deprived the Jews their legal equality. Arguing it was the French state and not the Free and Hanseatic City of Hamburg which had emancipated the Jews in town, the senate took the decisions of the German Confederation on the rights of the Jews, in Johann Smidt's manipulated formulation, as the legal grounds. The old Reglement der Judenschaft of 1710 regained legal validity with few modifications, e.g. Jews who had moved into Hamburg under French rule were all granted residence permits under the restrictive 1710 regulation allowing them to stay.

== In civic equality and religious freedom ==
The decisive assistance in the finally successful fight for equal rights came because in the elections of autumn 1848 for the Hamburg State Constituent Assembly (Konstituante) also the Jews had voting rights. To get those votes, two opposing groups promised them equal rights. On 21 February 1849, adopting the legislation of the Frankfurt National Assembly, the city-state administration granted equal rights to Jews (Jewish emancipation). The Constituent Assembly enacted the Constitution of the Free State of Hamburg of 11 July 1849, confirming the equal rights to all citizens which was the start for widespread integration. Unlike some other states in the German Confederation the city-state did not revoke the Jewish emancipation in the following years in the restorative Concert of Europe.

On 1 February 1865 a new law abolished the compulsion for Jews to enroll with one of Hamburg's two statutory Jewish congregations (the Ashkenazi Deutsch-Israelitische Gemeinde (DIG); or the Holy Congregation of the Sephardim Beit Israel [German: Heilige Gemeinde der Sephardim Beith Israel / Hebrew: בית ישראל]; est. 1652 by merging Hamburg's three previously separate Sephardic congregations).

So the members of the Reform-aligned New Israelite Temple Society were free to found their own Jewish congregation. The fact that its members were no longer compelled to associate with the Ashkenazi DIG meant that it could possibly fall apart. In order to prevent this and to reconstitute the DIG as a religious body with voluntary membership in a liberal civic state the DIG held general elections among its full-aged male members, to form a college of 15 representatives (Repräsentanten-Kollegium), who would further negotiate the future constitution of the DIG. The liberal faction gained nine, the Orthodox faction six seats. After lengthy negotiations the representatives enacted the statutes of the DIG on 3 November 1867.

The new DIG constitution provided for tolerance among the DIG members as to matters of the cult (worship) and religious tradition. This unique model, thus called Hamburg System (Hamburger System), established a two-tiered organisation of the DIG with the college of representatives and the umbrella administration in charge of matters of general Ashkenazi interest, such as cemetery, zedakah for the poor, hospital and representation of the Ashkenazim towards the outside. The second tier formed the so-called Kultusverbände (worship associations), associations independent in religious and financial matters by their own elected boards and membership dues, but within the DIG, took care of religious affairs.

Each member of the DIG, but also any non-associated Jew, was entitled to join a worship association, but did not have to. So since 1868 the Reform movement formed within the DIG a Kultusverband, the Reform Jewish Israelitischer Tempelverband (Israelite Temple association). The other worship associations were the Orthodox Deutsch-Israelitischer Synagogenverband (German-Israelite Synagogue association, est. 1868) and the 1892-founded but only 1923-recognised conservative Verein der Neuen Dammtor-Synagoge (Association of the new Dammtor synagogue). The worship associations had agreed that all services commonly provided such as burials, britot mila, zedakah for the poor, almshouses, hospital care and food offered in these institutions had to fulfill Orthodox requirements.

Zionists saw in the two-tiered Hamburg System recognition of their point of view that the ancient term ʿAm Yisrael (People of Israel), having been used since diaspora as the term describing the religious community of Jews, translates in modern political theory into a modern style nation. So very secular Zionists, engaged in the community on tier one of the Deutsch-Israelitische Gemeinde (DIG), praised the model, and never or hardly ever made use of the services supplied by any of the worship associations on tier two, let alone ever joined one.

Within the scope of modern city-life religious exogamy was widespread among Hamburg Jews with 1,409 DIG members alive being spouses in an interfaith marriage in 1924, and 20,266 such couples all over Germany (and c. 35,000 countrywide in 1932, with then almost 500,000 Jewish Germans), whereas 57.6% of all new marriages of 1924, including enrolled members of the Deutsch-Israelitische Gemeinde, were interfaith.

== Under Nazi rule ==
With and maybe due to government enforced anti-Semitic propaganda following the Nazi takeover of rule in 1933, the number of interfaith marriages dropped to 32% of all marriages including enrolled members of the DIG in 1934, the last year before the Nuremberg Laws outlawed what Nazis considered miscegenation and forbade from then on to conclude so-called mixed marriages, however, without compulsorily divorcing all extant such couples. Of course the Deutsch-Israelitische Gemeinde did not include marriages of born Jews with spouses previously converted to Judaism in these statistics, by the Halachah converts are Jews, and marriages with them are not interfaith.

This makes these statistics uncomparable with Nazi statistics on what they called mixed marriages (Mischehen), which they claimed to be interracial marriages based on the garbled Nazi racism of a superior Aryan race, however, with racial status for an individual technically fixed along enrollments of parents and grandparents with religious congregations, recorded in archives and certified in 'Aryan' certificates, regardless of her or his actual religion, let alone applying genetical research of any kind.

On 1 January 1938, after the incorporation of neighbouring cities into Hamburg in 1937, the smaller Ashkenazi congregations of Altona (Hochdeutsche Israeliten-Gemeinde zu Altona; HIG), Harburg-Wilhelmsburg (Synagogen-Gemeinde Harburg-Wilhelmsburg) and Wandsbek (Israelitische Gemeinde zu Wandsbek) merged in the DIG, on this occasion the Nazi Reich Ministry of ecclesiastical affairs forced the greater DIG to adopt a new name. The Nazi administrators took pleasure in humiliating the congregation by denying its continued use of the name Deutsch-Israelitische Gemeinde, arguing the term Deutsch (i.e. German) would be impossible for Jewish organisations, the Nazi government generally denied Jewish Germans their Germanness, Israelitisch (i.e. Israelite) were too ambiguous, the clearly anti-Semitic doctrine demanded the term Jüdisch (i.e. Jewish) and in December 1937 the Reich Ministry of the Interior objected the term Gemeinde which would be inapt, because the term also stands for a commune or municipality in German law (Gemeinde, however, means as much congregation, but there was no way to argue with the ministry), so the greater DIG renamed as Jüdischer Religionsverband Hamburg (JRH; i.e. Hamburg Jewish religious association).

In March 1938 the JRH was deprived its status as statutory corporation (Körperschaft des öffentlichen Rechts; entailing loss of tax privileges), followed by the abolition of its constitutional bodies on 2 December the same year, such as the legislative college of representatives (Repräsentanten-Kollegium), subjecting the JRH executive board directly to Gestapo orders. In 1939 the tiny Sephardic congregation was forced to merge in the JRH, which again had to also enlist non-Jews of Jewish descent categorised by the Nazis as so-called racially Jewish, such as irreligionists or Christians with three or more Jewish grandparents. Thus having lost its character as a merely religious congregation, but turned into an administration of those Hamburgers persecuted by Nazi anti-Semitism. On 1 August 1942 the tasks of the JRH were handed over to the new Reichsvereinigung (RV), on 21 November the JRH was formally merged in the RV becoming its local branch office, styled Bezirk Nordwest of the RV (District Northwest). Its remaining assets and staff was assumed by the RV-District Northwest.

=== Holocaust ===
Systematic deportations of Jewish Germans and Gentile Germans of Jewish descent started on 18 October 1941, logistally and technically supported by the remaining rump administration of JRH and subsequently RV Northwest, e.g. as to choosing who is put on lists, when the Gestapo demanded a certain number of people to be collected for a deportion it planned. Deportations were all directed to Ghettos in Nazi-occupied Europe or to concentration camps. The few remaining employees of the RV Northwest, except for those somewhat protected by a so-called mixed marriage, were deported from Hamburg on 23 June 1943 to Theresienstadt.

Most deported persons were murdered in the Shoah, and roughly 7,800 Jews from Hamburg were murdered during the Nazi era. The Neuengamme concentration camp, established in 1938 by the SS near the village of Neuengamme in the Bergedorf borough of Hamburg, originally mostly incarcerated prisoners, regardless of their racist categorisation by arbitrary Nazi ideology, suspected of political resistance or opposition, later received inmates imprisoned for the sheer reason of being Jewish, especially by the end of the Nazi era when extermination camps were inaccessible because Allied forces had liberated them. On 14 February 1945 a last deportation train with 124 Jews from Hamburg departed to Theresienstadt of whom 120 survived and returned in summer 1945 because their tragedy had soon been ended by their liberation in May of that year.

Many murdered or else persecuted Hamburg Jews are commemorated by Stolpersteine.

== Jewish Community since 1945 ==
Jewish survivors in town, especially those 650 somewhat protected by a so-called mixed marriage, some few who had survived hiding, or those liberated and released from forced labour made up the community in town. Returners from deportations starting coming in summer, while Jewish foreigners stranded after liberation started to return home or to new destinations. Jews from exile usually returned only once living conditions in destitute defeated Germany had stabilised again. On 8 July 1945 twelve Jews met in Hamburg in preparation of a refoundation of the congregation. On 25 July more interested persons joined and they appointed a provisional board of 15, with 170 people who indicated their will to join. On 6 September 1945 a provisional synagogue opened on the street Kielort 22/24 and on 18 September the same year 72 members elected the first postwar board.

Max Brauer, an outspoken non-Jewish fighter against anti-Semitism already before 1933, returned from US exile to Hamburg being elected its first post-WW II First Mayor (Hamburg's head of government) in 1946, managed to win Herbert Weichmann in 1948 to remigrate from US exile too, joining Brauer's senate and becoming the first Jew to be elected into office of First Mayor (1965-1971), and with Hamburg being a city-state of the Federal Republic of Germany, the first Jewish head of state government in Germany.
