= Viola Roggenkamp =

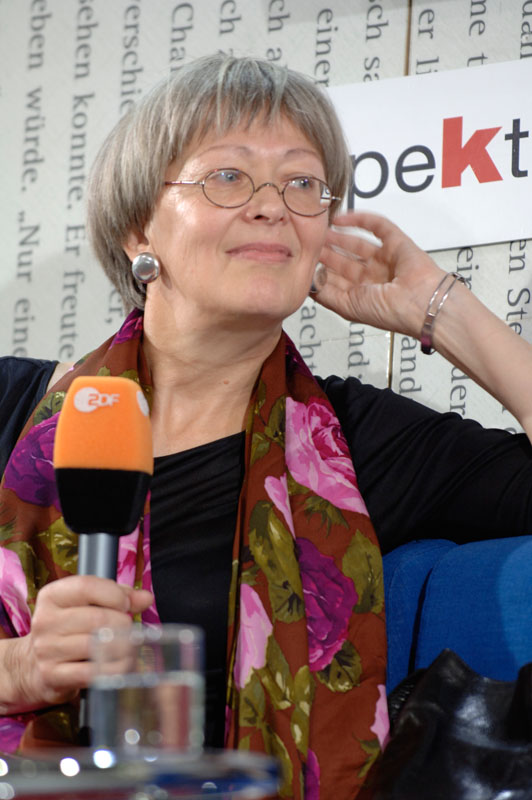
- Viola Roggenkamp in 2005
- Born: 15 April 1948; Hamburg, Germany
- Occupations: Journalist; commentator; feminist activist; author
- Father: Paul Roggenkamp

Viola Roggenkamp (born 15 April 1948) is a German journalist-commentator and writer. The themes to which she most often returns are those surrounding Feminism and Judaism in Germany during and following the brutish middle years of the twentieth century. Although these topics have been much revisited by scholars and critics throughout her lifetime, several of Roggenkamp's own perspectives and conclusions are well outside the mainstream. Her output includes (but is not limited to) literary portraits, essays, opinion pieces and novels.

== Life and works ==
Viola Roggenkamp was born and grew up in Hamburg. Although she has relocated abroad at several points during her adult life, it is to Hamburg that she has always returned, despite having a somewhat conflicted and at times alienated relationship with the city. It was in Hamburg that her parents had ended up "following the liberation" in 1945, having lived "illegally" in Polish Silesia during the wartime Polish occupation. After her father died (but while her mother was still alive) she explored her parents' lives during the war years in her 2011 semi-novel, "Tochter und Vater". Discussing the book with an interviewer she later explained that "the daughter is not me, but the father in the novel is my father. My father did all the courag[e]ous and unbelievable things [as a secret member of the Polish resistance in Kraków] that Paul, the father in the novel, did".

She studied Psychology, Philosophy and Music and then set out on her travels. During the later 1970s she visited India where she stayed for seven or eight months, living under the simplest of conditions and producing reports and stories about her surroundings for a German readership. She returned to Hamburg, but there have been frequent return trips to south Asia since then. Every time she returned to Germany, she told an interviewer later, the conditions back home came as a shock. She would notice how much more thinly spread the human population was in Hamburg than in India, and how the German supermarkets seemed troublingly overstocked. For two years between 1989 and 1991 Roggenkamp lived in Israel.

Throughout her itinerant years she worked as a free-lance journalist, regularly contributing thoughtful well-researched pieces in the (West) German press, most notably and regularly for the Hamburg-based weekly mass-circulation national newspaper Die Zeit, for which she wrote regularly between 1976 and 2013. In 1977 Roggenkamp was a founder member of the team around Alice Schwarzer that created the magazine EMMA. (The name of the magazine is a wordplay based on the word "emancipation".) She worked for EMMA as a free-lance reporter till the early 1990s. For four years between 2000 and 2004 she provided a regular column for the progressive centre-left cooperative-owned newspaper "taz". Since 1990 she has been writing for the Berlin-based weekly publication die Jüdische Allgemeine. In 2016 she became, in addition, a regular contributor to the monthly magazine, Cicero.

"I am a German Jewess. I am the daughter of a Jewess. And in my judgment Judaism is no mere question of belief.”
"Ich bin deutsche Jüdin. Ich bin die Tochter einer Jüdin; und meiner Meinung nach ist Judentum keine Glaubensfrage."

Viola Roggenkamp in conversation with Michael Wolffsohn and Andreas Main
Deutschlandfunk radio interview, 22 September 2016.

Roggenkamp's first published "novel" appeared only in 2004. "Familienleben" ("Family life"), which can be described as an "autobiographically inspired novel", was well received by leading critics. Recommended to television viewers by the influential presenter and literary critic Elke Heidenreich, it quickly proved a commercial success, notwithstanding its unfashionable length. It runs to more than 400 pages and has been translated into a number of different languages. The narrator-protagonist is a 13-year-old child called Fania. Fania is the younger of the parents' two daughters. The narrative deals with the daily life of a German-Jewish family living in Hamburg in 1967. In her powerfully positive review of the book in Der Spiegel, Jana Hensel provides a little context: "For three decades Viola Roggenkamp kept her project for a novel to herself. The result, now, is an almost eerily perfect book ... All the characters in it are perfectly defined with great dramatic clarity, replete with their psychological contradictions". The relationship between holocaust survivors and their children in Germany was the underlying theme both of "Familienleben" and of Roggenkamp's next book, "Die Frau im Turm" ("The woman in the tower") which appeared in 2009. "Tochter und Vater" (2011) again incorporated as its starting point and at its core, the author's own experiences, and what she had discerned of her parents' lives in Silesia during the war. Her mother was dead by the time she started writing this third book, and had, with tact but also evident difficulty, refrained from asking questions about the earlier work, "Familienleben" after Viola had admitted that she was writing it. Nevertheless, the author sent her mother a copy in the mail and was surprised by the reaction: "After she read the book, she told me she was surprised to discover that I was aware of the trauma she carried with her. She always thought she protected me and my sister from all that." The three books driven by her own experiences of growing up as the child of holocaust survivors in Hamburg only came after years of soul searching and quiet enquiry about the experiences of German Jews who had grown up in Germany as the children of holocaust survivors. By the end of the twentieth century there had been plenty published by then children of parents who had perpetrated holocaust killings and other acts of persecution – or simply quietly colluded, taking care not to follow up the rumours of what was going on in the camps. But there had been virtual silence from the children in Germany of holocaust survivors who simply wanted to forget, and lived under the shadow of a deeply entrenched terror that somehow, it could all happen again one day. There were, in any case, not too many holocaust survivors who had ended up bringing up children still living in Germany. From the perspective of a writer with insights to share, as Roggenkamp has told at least one interviewer, her "family suffered, but [she is] lucky to have [her] non-typical background." But her experiences are nevertheless in many respects far from unique: before publishing the three books based on her own childhood experiences she had already, in 2002, published "Tu mir eine Liebe. Meine Mamme" (loosely, "Be a love... My mummy"). The subtitle is more enlightening than the main title: "Jüdische Frauen und Männer in Deutschland sprechen von ihrer Mutter" ("Jewish women and men in Germany talk about their mothers"). The volume is based on 26 interview-portraits in which higher-profile Germans talk about their mothers, all of whom are holocaust survivors. The interviewees include Stefan Heym, Esther Dischereit, Wladimir Kaminer, Rachel Salamander, Stefanie Zweig, and Michael Wolffsohn. Most of these are members of Roggenkamp's own generation or younger, and so unable to remember the holocaust on their own account: yet all of them have had their lives defined by the holocaust, primarily through the effect the experiences of it had on their mothers. Survivor guilt is, perhaps, the most frequently recurring of the Leitmotiven identified in the interviews. Prior to the volume's publication the interview-portraits had already been published individually in Jüdische Allgemeine.

== Erika Mann controversy ==
In 2005 Viola Roggenkamp published a lengthy essay – some identify it as a short book – on Erika Mann, a daughter – probably her father's favourite daughter – of Thomas Mann. The essay was entitled "Erika Mann. Eine jüdische Tochter": it reignited the smouldering controversy about Erika Mann's own attitude to her mother's Jewish ancestry. For many people Thomas Mann was the greatest German language writer of the twentieth century. Roggenkamp's contribution concerning his attitude to his wife's Jewish provenance was bound to attract attention. Roggenkamp asserted that although much had been written about Thomas and Katia Mann, Katia's Jewish ancestry had been very little delved into, beyond bald statements recording the fact that she had, like her mother and like her children, been baptised (as a Christian). Roggenkamp was particularly critical, in this respect, of so-called "Mann-experts" such as Heinrich Breloer, as well as Inge and Walter Jens. Roggenkamp contended that the tendency of the Mann family (along with their many admirers and other researchers) to ignore the Jewish roots of Thomas Mann's wealthy father-in-law, Alfred Pringsheim amounted to denial and was deeply damaging. From California, the scholar (and Vienna-born holocaust survivor) Ruth Klüger summarized Roggenkamp's position for readers of Die Welt:

- "According to Roggenkamp Erika Mann consistently denied her Jewish provenance on her mother's side, in the sense that she never classified herself as Jewish. This denial came close to becoming a piece of psychological repression in a Freudian sense, which then worked itself out destructively – or at least negatively – in Erika's life, her writing and her thinking. You can, to be sure, pick out and question individual details on this hastily written polemical little book, but the author is certain correct to feel the need to raise questions if the daughter of a prominent and only partially assimilated [Jewish] family (Katia – Erika's mother – had been baptised into Christianity, but Old-man Pringsheim had not), during a period of very great persecution of Jews to which she might easily have fallen victim, should have set aside her Jewish heritage. ....so this highly gifted woman gradually became Thomas Mann's daughter, and nothing more. Her exceptionally close relationship to an exceptionally self-centred father blocked her own path to a life of her own".

Klüger is strongly positive about Roggenkamp's imputations as to Erika Mann's inner thoughts and beliefs. Her insistence that much of the book's explosive impact comes from a wider context, in which discussion of the fate of German Jewry during the post-war period has been suppressed, is a judgement that Roggenkamp self-evidently shares. The summary to her review is overwhelmingly supportive:

- "Roggenkamp irritates and provokes. But it is difficult to resist the urgency and topicality of the irritations. By sharing her insights and conclusions on the German-Jewish relationship within the cultural élite, the author has shown no small courage in opening up a hornets' nest.

Another expatriate observer, Manfred Koch, writing in the Neue Zürcher Zeitung, was less sympathetic:

- "The writer's judgmental attitude is astonishing. From the outset, she does not shy away from placing anyone who might criticise her case under suspicion of antisemitism. Roggenkamp eulogises a vague 'essentialism of Jewishness', which spares her the necessity of coming up with any more precise historical analysis. .... At the launch of the German empire almost two-thirds of Germany's Jews were part of an economic and cultural elite; they had left religious constraints and lifestyles behind. .... The lack of interest in their Jewish heritage that the Pringsheims, like many others like them, took is not the result of some pathological repression or betrayal. Erika Mann fought against antisemitism whenever she encountered it. That she thought of herself not as a Jew but as a democratic humanist like any other ... who should blame her?"

Commentators piled in on both sides. (Some were even content to try colonizing the middle ground.) Viola Roggenkamp's public profile, along with appreciation of her insights, were permanently raised and enhanced. Roland H. Wiegenstein applied a little psychological interpretation of his own in Die Berliner Literaturkritik, suggesting that Roggenkamp's decision to share her conclusions on Erika Mann's denial of her Jewishness was,

- "... certainly all of a piece with the historical illuminations that the author has previously shared in her novels of family life. .... For Viola roggenkamp, Erika Mann becomes a kind of flawed role model ("Identifikationsfigur"), just as Rahel Varnhagen was for the young Hannah Arendt. Roggenkamp conducts a phoney battle with her heroine and wishes the matter could be other than it is".

Tilmann Lahme, who provided his review in the Frankfurter Allgemeine Zeitung, is deeply underwhelmed. He does not think that Roggenkamp had found out too much about why Erika Mann, like her mother before her, wanted nothing to do with her Jewish roots. But he has discovered plenty about Roggenkamp's own grief over the loss of Jewish lives in Germany, and about her anger, "although it remains unclear why this is principally directed against Thomas Mann".
