= Käte Rosenheim =

German-American Jewish social worker (1892-1979)

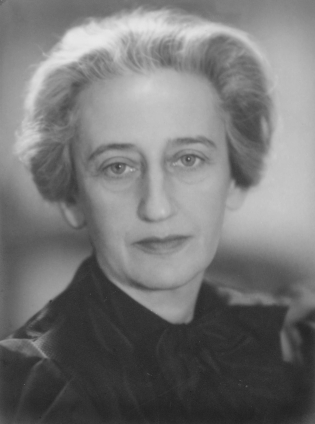
- Born: January 13, 1892; Berlin
- Died: December 4, 1979 (aged 87); Cupertino, California
- Known for: Social worker

Käte Rosenheim (born January 13, 1892 in Berlin; died December 4, 1979 in Cupertino, USA) was a German - American Jewish social worker, especially known for her help in rescuing children and young people from Nazi Germany.

== Life and work ==
Käte Rosenheim was the elder of two daughters of the physician and lecturer Theodor Rosenheim and his wife Hedwig, née Lipmann, a homemaker. Her younger sister was Hildegard (1903-1986). For her well-to-do, non-religious Jewish parents, their children's education was of great importance. Theater and concert outings, as well as longer trips, were central to family life. Käte received some private tutoring and attended the Kallmorgen Higher School for Girls. Afterward, she, who had been active in the Jewish Women's League since 1904, chose one of the traditional forms of self-employment within her circles—the profession of social worker. From 1909 to 1912, she attended the Social Women's School in Berlin, which had been founded and directed by Alice Salomon in 1908. Following this, Rosenheim completed training as a maternity nurse and attended lectures at the University of Berlin.

She was active in many areas of social welfare: until 1914 in child welfare, from 1914 to 1915 in the National Women's Service, from 1915 to 1916 in the library of the Women's Vocational Office, from 1916 to 1918 at the War Office in the Marches as a transport supervisor and advisor for female auxiliary workers. Between 1918 and 1919, Rosenheim worked for the German League for the League of Nations (Women's Department), and from 1919 in the Prussian Ministry of the Interior, where she became the personal secretary of Minister Carl Severing. From 1930 to 1933, she was employed as a department head for social welfare in the government department of the Berlin Police Headquarters.

Jews had been persecuted in Germany for a long time prior to 1933, but the problem became much more acute when the Nazis came to power that year. Rosenheim was removed from her position of responsibility under the Law for the Restoration of the Professional Civil Service. She subsequently became involved with the Central Welfare Agency of Jews in Germany. There, she organized the emigration of children and young people (up to 16 years old) to safety abroad and, in this capacity, also served as the contact person for the German Jewish Children's Aid (GJCA), a Jewish organization in New York that had been facilitating the entry of Jewish children from Germany into the USA since 1934. In 1936, Rosenheim traveled to the USA in person to learn about the situation of the rescued children. That year, through the cooperation between the Central Welfare Agency and the GJCA, 161 boys and 76 girls had been brought to the USA.

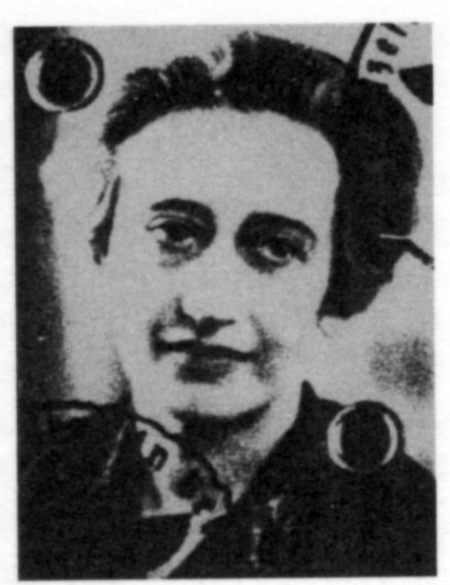
Käte Rosenheim

After the November pogroms of 1938, Rosenheim herself accompanied several Kindertransports to England. She experienced firsthand the strange mixture of happiness and pain, of gratitude and worry among the parents of the children and young people as well as among the transport escorts.

By August 1939, Rosenheim and her staff had enabled approximately 7,250 children and young people to escape from Germany. When the Second World War broke out in September 1939, the Kindertransports to England came to an abrupt end. Rosenheim was the head of the Berlin office of child emigration. While very capable, she was insistent on following correct procedures and behavior and as such was opposed acts such as smuggling children past the Gestapo and other officials. She severely criticized those who did do such things, including Max Plaut.

In December 1940, she fled with her mother via Cuba to the United States. (Note: South sources also list her route as including France, Spain, and Portugal prior to her getting to Cuba.) There she later graduated from the New York School of Social Work and worked as a social worker in New York City and San Francisco until her retirement in 1958. She never married. Her younger sister had come to America in 1939. In their senior years they lived near each other in California.

Between 2003 and 2004, five students from the Schiller Gymnasium and three students from the Catholic Liebfrauenschule in Berlin researched the rescue of Jewish children from Nazi Germany. They paid particular attention to the enormous achievements of Käte Rosenheim and Recha Freier. The resulting exhibition was on display at the Centrum Judaicum until January 31, 2005.
