= World's Congress of Representative Women =

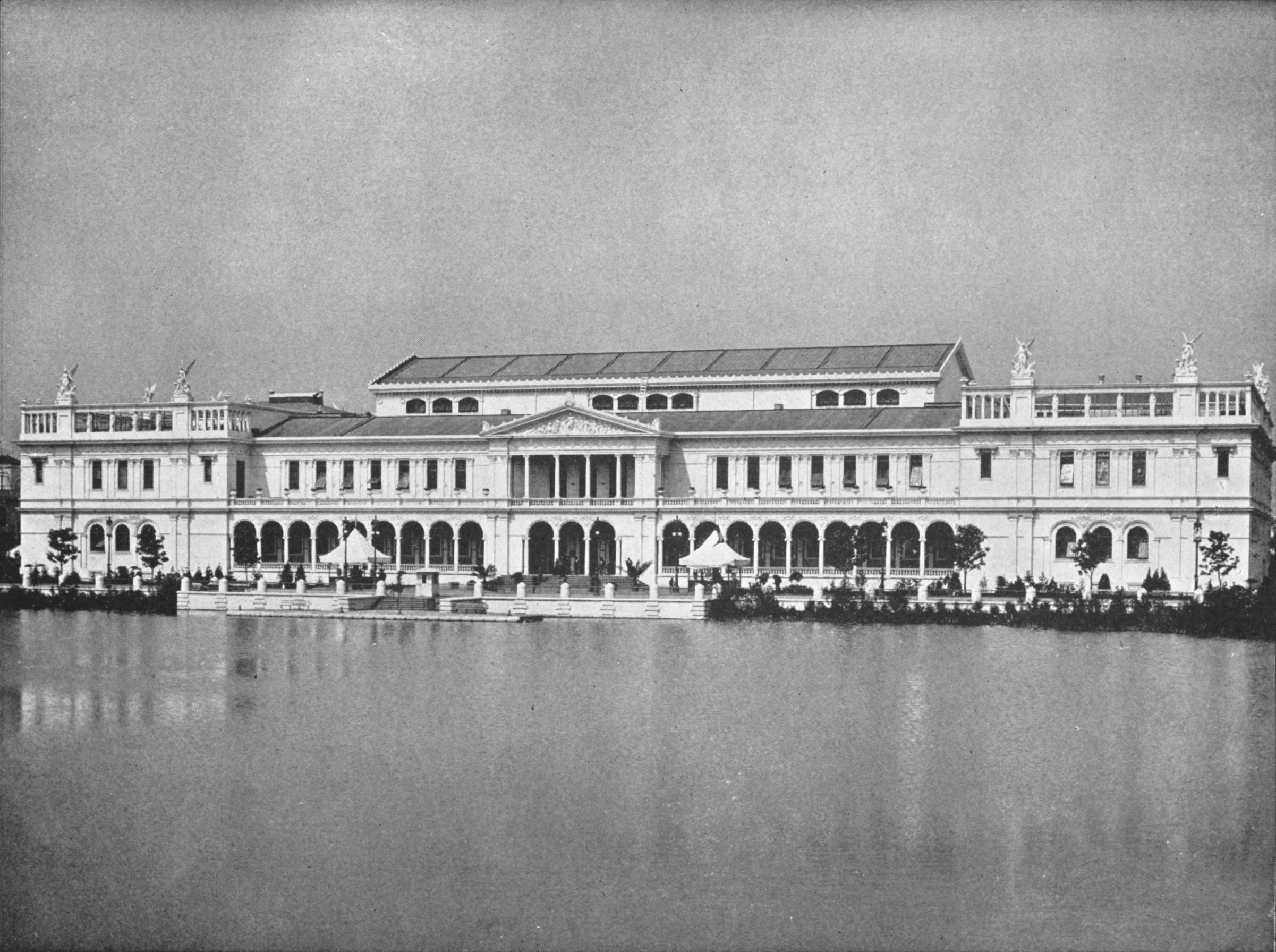
The Woman's Building

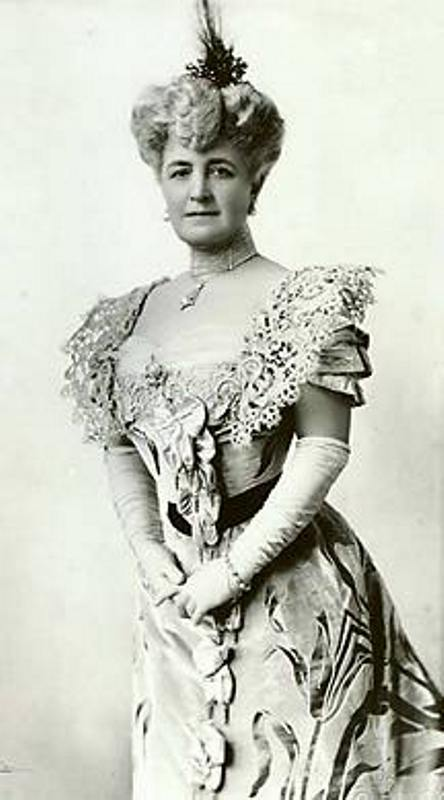
Bertha Palmer, president

The World's Congress of Representative Women was a week-long convention for the voicing of women's concerns, held within the World's Congress Auxiliary Building in conjunction with the World's Columbian Exposition in Chicago, Illinois, United States in May 1893. At 81 meetings, organized by women from each of the United States, 150,000 people came to the World's Congress Auxiliary Building and listened to speeches given by almost 500 women from 27 countries.

The World's Congress of Representative Women was arranged, sponsored and promoted by the Board of Lady Managers of the World's Congress Auxiliary, under the guidance of President Bertha Palmer, the wife of prominent Chicagoan Potter Palmer. The men of the Auxiliary formed seventeen departments and held more than 100 congresses with a variety of political, social and technical agendas; the women's branch held just one congress. Of all the congresses at the World's Columbian Exposition, the World's Congress of Representative Women was the most highly attended.

== Inception ==
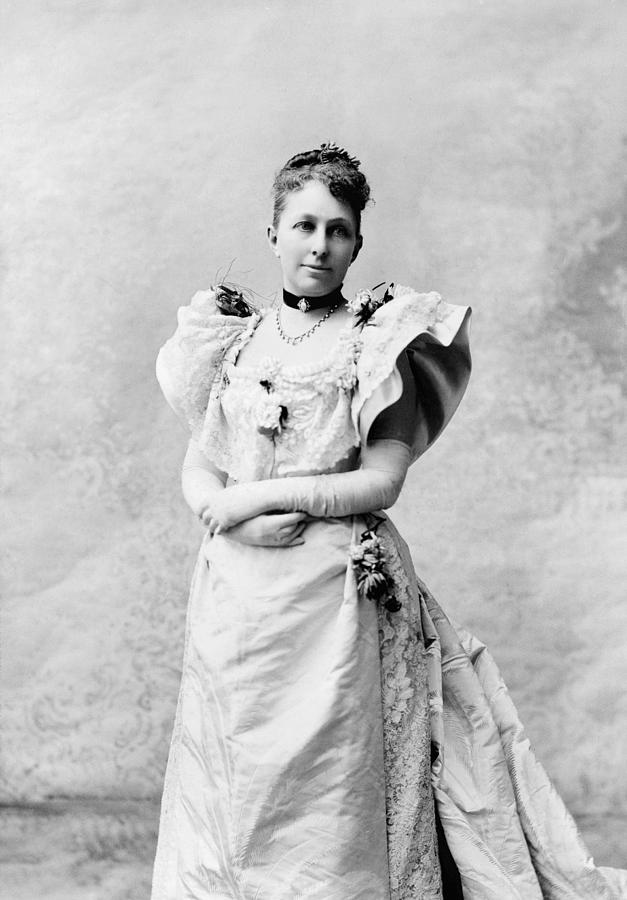
Ellen Martin Henrotin, vice-president

The inception of the World's Congress of Representative Women may be traced back to February, 1891, when the National Council of Women of the United States, then in session in Washington, D.C., decided to recommend to the officers of the International Council of Women that the first quinquennial session of the International Council should be held in Chicago in the summer of 1893 instead of in London as originally intended. This decision was reinforced by the very cordial invitation of Mrs. Palmer, who attended the sessions of the National Council as the delegate of the Board of Lady Managers, and as president of the Woman's Branch of the World's Congress Auxiliary. This invitation was supplemented by a similar one from Ellen Martin Henrotin (Mrs. Charles Henrotin), vice-president of the Woman's Branch of the World's Congress Auxiliary, who also was in attendance at the Council sessions.

In pursuance of the plan thus initiated, the U.S. officers of the International Council obtained the consent of the foreign officers to the proposed change from London to Chicago. The Executive Committee of the National Council of Women of the United States pledged the National Council to entertain free of expense all foreign delegates while in attendance upon the proposed meeting of the International Council.

The call for the meeting of the International Council in Chicago was promptly issued, accompanied by the pledge of entertainment above referred to, and both call and pledge were given wide publicity through the home and foreign press, and through private and official correspondence, in the early summer of 1891, the documents bearing date May 31, 1891.

In due time, as the plan of the World's Congress Auxiliary developed, the officers of the National Council of Women of the United States entered into correspondence with the Hon. Charles C. Bonney, president of the World's Congress Auxiliary, requesting that the quinquennial meeting of the International Council of Women, announced for the summer of 1893, should be adopted as one of the series of congresses organized by the Auxiliary, with the understanding that its scope should be enlarged to the greatest possible extent; that it should take the name of “The World's Congress of Representative Women;" and that it should be subject to the same rules and enjoy the same privileges as the other congresses in the series.

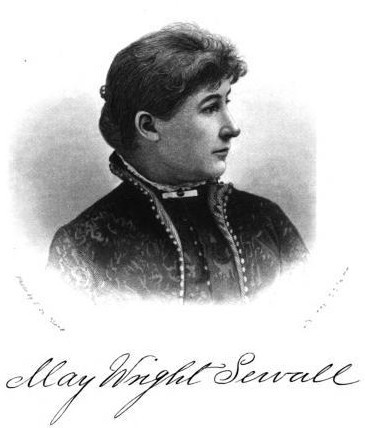
May Wright Sewall, chair

This formal application from the officers of the National Council of Women of the United States was made by its president, May Wright Sewall, of Indianapolis, under date of May 29, 1892. The executive committee of the National Council of Women, at a meeting held in Chicago on May 9 and 10, had authorized the president of the council, Mrs. May Wright Sewall, to represent the interests of the council in Europe during the summer of 1892, with a view to increase foreign interest in the proposed meeting of the International Council of Women in Chicago in May 1893.

== Preparations ==
After this proposed meeting of the International Council of Women had been merged into the greater project of a World's Congress of Representative Women under the auspices of the World's Congress Auxiliary, Sewall naturally devoted herself, during the three months spent in Germany, Belgium, and France, in the ensuing summer, to awakening among the prominent women with whom she came in contact an interest in the proposed World's Congress of Representative Women. While invested with no official authority to represent the Auxiliary, Sewall was greatly aided in her efforts by her position as chairman of the Committee of Arrangements, and by her connection with the National and International Councils of Women, the essential features of which were already well known abroad, and served to divest the idea of a World's Congress of Women of much of the strangeness it would otherwise have assumed in the minds of foreign women.

The main objects to be accomplished in this foreign work were as follows: First, to make clear the distinction between the World's Columbian Exposition, the Board of Lady Managers, the World's Congress Auxiliary, with its Woman's Branch, and the National and International Councils of Women, these bodies being naturally confounded continually, and almost hopelessly, by those who heard of them only through the vague paragraphs of the foreign press; second, to impart a clear understanding of the magnitude of the proposed congress, both as a whole and in its infinite details and subdivisions; third, to show the exact nature of the papers and reports desired from European delegates, and the character of the subjects to be treated; fourth, to stimulate the foreign women to appoint delegates from organizations already existing, and to form new organizations to be represented in like manner; fifth, to encourage individuals to come to Chicago whether connected with organized bodies or not; sixth, to endeavor to reach the general European public through reports, interviews, and articles published in the European press; and, seventh, to combat unceasingly not only the general apathy in regard to a project so remote in time and place, but also the specific objections everywhere encountered, based upon the date chosen for the congress, which did not fall within the foreign vacation period, upon the length, hazard, and cost of the journey, and upon the grossly exaggerated reports of the expense of living in Chicago, and the heat of Chicago summers.

In Berlin, Sewall devoted a month to personal interviews with women prominent in philanthropy and education, and to informal conferences with groups of ladies representing, among other organizations, the following: the Scheppeler-Lette Verein, the Frauenwohl, the Jugendschutz, the Vaterländischer Frauenverein, the Edelweiss Verein, the Victoria Haus, the Victoria Lyceum, the Pestalossi Froebel-Verein, the Künstlerinnen- und Schriftstellerinnen-Verein, the Mädchen Realschule-Verein, and the Volksküchen. Many of these enjoy the protection of the Empress Frederick. Among the women who were most responsive to her appeals and most influential in spreading a knowledge of the movement among a wider circle were Henriette Schrader-Breymann, Anna Von Helmholtz, Hedwig Heyl, Elisabet Kaselowsky, Lina Morgenstern, Helene Lange, Lucie Crain, Dr. Henriette Hirschfeld-Tiburtius, Frau Direktor Iessen, Claire Schubert-Feder., Ph.D.; Ulrike Henschke, Fräulein von Hobe, and Hanna Bieber-Böhm.

Sewall supplemented her work in Berlin by a visit to Hamburg, where she was granted an extended interview with the Empress Frederick, who showed herself deeply interested in the plan of the proposed congress, and declared herself ready to aid by every means in her power in securing an adequate representation of German women in its deliberations. In Brussels, Sewall addressed the Ligue belge du droit des femmes ("Belgian Woman's Rights League"), an influential organization, whose leaders were Marie Popelin and Louis Frank. Popelin and Frank advanced the cause of women in Belgium. In Paris, Sewall spoke in the Hall of the Mairie St. Sulpice to a large audience, and devoted the following fourteen days to conferences with the leaders among the women of Paris, singly and in groups. In addition to the interest aroused in these influential groups of German, Belgian, and French women by the visit and personal solicitations of the chairman of the Committee of Arrangements, wide publicity was given to her addresses by the press of France, Russia, Belgium, England, and Italy, and thus the scope of the great congress was made known to many thousands of European women of influence in their respective localities.

Sewall returned to the U.S. early in September. Meanwhile, Rachel Foster Avery, in her office at Somerton, Philadelphia, Pennsylvania, was planning and carrying out a voluminous and searching correspondence with prominent individuals in the U.S. and other countries, and especially with the executive officers of every national body of women at home and abroad, preparing the way for the selection and appointment of prominent women from every nation on the Advisory Councils, for the selection of persons to prepare papers for the General Congress and reports for the Report Congresses, and for the formal enrollment of all national organizations of women as members of the World's Congress of Representative Women, entitled to send delegates thereto and to hold department congresses in connection therewith. The responses to the appeals thus made by the secretary were so prompt and so generally sympathetic that it became immediately evident that a wide-spread interest was aroused, and that the success of the congress was assured. Every precaution was taken to place the movement on the broadest possible plane, and thus to allay any apprehensions of unfair treatment that might arise on the part of weaker or younger organizations.

After the simple facts regarding the inception of the plan had been stated, all organizations were placed upon exactly the same level, and all official documents issued reiterated in appropriate terms the assurance that all organizations, whether large or small in membership and influence, stood upon an equal footing in the opportunities granted to each by the committee charged with the preparations for the programme of the great congress. The spirit of fairness was so manifest in all the preliminary work of the committee that organization after organization gave in its formal adhesion to the congress, until scarcely a national woman's organization in the United States or in Europe stood aloof.

The most important document was the Preliminary Address, issued in September, 1892. It was distributed in French and in English versions by tens of thousands—not at random, but to carefully selected addresses in every country. It was reprinted from time to time substantially without change, either alone or as a part of more comprehensive statements, as the needs of the work required, the last edition bearing date April 12, 1893, about four weeks before the convening of the congress.

== Administration ==
The series of World's Congresses which convened in Chicago during the World's Columbian Exposition under the auspices of the World's Congress Auxiliary were opened by a "Congress of the Representative Women of all Lands". This Congress was, without doubt, the largest and most representative gathering of women ever convened in the U.S. or any other country. It assembled in the Woman's Building on Monday morning, May 15, 1893, immediately after the general opening of the World's Congress series, and adjourned Sunday evening, May 21, 1893. There were 76 sessions and over 600 participants. The greatest interest was manifested by participants from all parts of the world, and the aggregate attendance for the week was over 150,000.

While the officers of the World's Congress Auxiliary provided for the liberal participation of women in other departments of thought, like Education, Science, Music, Religion, Moral and Social Reform, Government, they also decided to give a full week to a Woman's Congress for the purpose of presenting to the people of the world the wonderful progress of women throughout the world in the many departments of intellectual activity.

This Congress, which represented the "Department of Woman's Progress" in the general programme of the World's Congress Auxiliary, was under the direct supervision of the Woman's Branch of the Auxiliary, of which Bertha Palmer was president and Ellen Martin Henrotin, vice-president. The work of organization was committed, under the supervision of those officers, to a general committee composed of the following women: May Wright Sewall, chair; Rachel Foster Avery, secretary; Frances Willard, Dr. Sarah Hackett Stevenson, Dr. Julia Holmes Smith, Lydia Avery Coonley, Elizabeth Boynton Harbert, and Mary Spalding Brown.

== Program ==
=== Education ===
- The Kindergarten as an Educational Agency and the Relation of the Kindergarten to Manual Training – Sarah Brown Ingersoll Cooper
- The Kindergarten and the Primary School — Miss N. Cropsey
- The Ethical Influence of Woman in Education - Kate Tupper Galpin
- The Popular Inculcation of Economy - Sara Louise Vickers Oberholtzer
- Educational Training in Its Bearing Upon the Promotion of Social Purity - Dr. Jennie de la Montagnie Lozier
- The Highest Education - Mary Mathews Adams
- The Catholic Woman as an Educator - Mary A. B. Maher

=== Literature and the dramatic art ===
- Member of the Literary Committee - Louise E. Francis
- Woman's Place in the Republic of Letters - Annie Nathan Meyer
- Woman in the Republic of Letters - Alice Wellington Rollins
- Organization as a Means of Literary Culture - Charlotte Emerson Brown,
- The Polish Woman in Literature - Prepared by T. E. C., M. D.
- Insurance Against Piracy of Brains — Kate Brownlee Sherwood
- Woman and the Stage – Helena Modjeska
- Woman in the Emotional Drama — Clara Morris
- The Stage and Its Women - Georgia Cayvan
- Woman's Work Upon the Stage — Julia Marlowe

=== Science and religion ===
- Woman in Science - Dr. Mary Putnam Jacobi
- The Medical Woman's Movement in the United Kingdom of Great Britain and Ireland to January, 1893 – Dr. Elizabeth Garrett Anderson
- The Medical Education of Women in Great Britain and Ireland - Dr. Sophia Jex-Blake
- Woman in the Pulpit - Rev. Florence E. Kollock
- Woman's Call to the Ministry – Rev. Caroline Bartlett Crane
- Woman as a Minister of Religion – Rev. Mary J. Safford

=== Charity, philanthropy, and religion ===
- The Modern Deaconess Movement – Jane Bancroft Robinson, Ph.D.
- Organization among Women Considered with Respect to Philanthropy - Mary E. Richmond
- The Organized Work of Catholic Women — Lily Alice Toomy
- Woman's Place in Hebrew Thought - Minnie Dessau Louis
- Woman as a Religious Teacher — Ursula Newell Gestefeld
- The Light in the East – Eliva Anne Thayer
- Organization Among Women as an Instrument in Promoting Religion - Mary Lowe Dickinson
- The Elevation of Womanhood Wrought through the Veneration of the Blessed Virgin – Emma F. Cary
- The Sisters of the People – Katherine Barrett Hughes

=== Moral and social reform ===
- The Moral Initiative as Related to Woman - Julia Ward Howe
- The Civil and Social Evolution of Woman - Elizabeth Cady Stanton
- Woman as a Social Leader - Josefa Humpal-Zeman
- The Ethics of Dress — Alice Timmons Toomy
- Woman's Dress from the Standpoint of Sociology - Prof. Ellen Hayes
- Dress Reform and Its Necessity – Florence Wallace Pomeroy, Viscountess Harberton
- Organization as an Instrument in Promoting Moral Reform – Maud Ballington Booth
- The Double Moral Standard, or the Moral Responsibility of Woman in Heredity – Helen H. Gardener
- The Moral Reform Union - Helen Taylor
- Temperance Education - Mary H. Hunt
- The Power of Womanliness in Dealing with Stern Problems - Florence Collins Porter
- Origin and Early History of the British Women's Temperance Association – Lady Henry Somerset
- The Origin, History, and Development of the World's Woman's Christian Temperance Union – Elizabeth Wheeler Andrew

=== The civil and political status of women ===
- The Origin and Objects of the Women's Franchise League of Great Britain and Ireland — Ursula Bright (Mrs. Jacob Bright)
- Work of the Franchise League - Florence Fenwick Miller
- Woman as an Actual Force in Politics - Ishbel Hamilton-Gordon, Marchioness of Aberdeen and Temair (The Countess of Aberdeen)
- Woman's Political Future – Frances Ellen Watkins Harper
- Woman as a Political Leader - J. Ellen Foster

=== Civil law and government ===
- Women in Municipal Government - Ida A. Harper
- One Phase of Woman's Work for the Municipality – Lillian Davis Duncanson
- Woman's Participation in Municipal Government - Laura M. Johns
- Organization Among Women as an Instrument in Promoting the Interests of Political Liberty - Susan B. Anthony
- Woman's Position and Influence in the Civil Law – Martha Strickland
- The Ethics of Suffrage - Elizabeth Cady Stanton
- Woman as an Annex – Helen H. Gardener
- The Value of the Eastern Star as a Factor in Giving Women a Better Understanding of Business Affairs, and Especially those Relating to Legislative Matters – Mary A. Flint
- The Relation of Woman to Our Present Political Problems - Abbie A. C. Peaslie
- Women's National Indian Association - Mrs. William E. Burke
- The Women's Liberal Federation of Scotland - The Countess of Aberdeen
- Finsk Qvinnoforening, the Finnish Women's Association - Alexandra Gripenberg, Baroness Gripenberg
- The Association for Married Women's Property Rights - Thorborg Rappe, Baroness Thorborg-Rappe

=== Industries and occupations ===
- Woman the New Factor in Economics – Augusta Cooper Bristol
- A New Avenue of Employment and Investment for Business Women - Juana A. Neal
- The Bohemian Woman as a Factor in Industry and Economy - Karla Máchová
- The Contribution of Women to the Applied Arts – Florence Elizabeth Cory
- The Influence of Women in Ceramic Art - M. B. Alling
- Pottery in the Household – M. Louise McLaughlin
- The Trades and Professions Underlying the Home – Alice M. Hart
- The Effect of Modern Changes in Industrial and Social Life on Woman's Marriage Prospects — Käthe Schirmacher
- Organization Among Women as an Instrument in Promoting the Interests of Industry – Kate Bond
- The Women's Protective and Provident League of Glasgow – E. E. Anderson
- Coöperative Housekeeping — Mary Coleman Stuckert
- Domestic Service and the Family Claim - Jane Addams

=== The solidarity of human interests ===
- The Solidarity of Human Interests – Isabelle Bogelot
- Women in Spain for the Last Four Hundred Years - Catalina d'Alcala
- Woman's Position in the South American States - Matilde G. de Miro Quesada
- The Women of Brazil - Martha Sesselberg
- Women in South America – Isabel King
- The Progress of Women in England – Helen Blackburn
- A Century of Progress for Women in Canada – Mary McDonnell
- The Progress of Women in New South Wales — C. C. Montefiore
- Our Debt to Zurich - Helen L. Webster
- The Intellectual Progress of the Colored Women of the United States Since the Emancipation Proclamation – Fannie Barrier Williams
- The Organized Efforts of the Colored Women of the South to Improve their Condition - Sarah Jane Woodson Early
- Woman's War for Peace — Nico Beck-Meyer
- Woman as an Explorer – May French-Sheldon
- The Organized Development of Polish Women - Helena Modjeska
- Woman in Italy - Fanny Zampini Salazar
- Women in Agriculture in Siam — Lady Linchee Suriya
- The Position of Women in Iceland - Sigrid E. Magnusson
- The Position of Women in Syria – Hanna K. Korany

== Legacy ==
Women at the World's Congress achieved the goals they sought. They had come from each state in the Union to staff and run offices, gather and spend resources, pay their workers, sign contracts; all without going into debt as had many of the men's subcommittees.

== Notable attendees ==
- Hallie Quinn Brown
- Fanny Jackson Coppin
- Barbara Galpin
- Mary Kenney
- Lorraine J. Pitkin
- Mary Stuart Smith
- Lucy Stone

Germany

- Auguste Förster
- Anna Simson
- Hanna Bieber-Böhm
- Käthe Schirmacher

== See also ==
- Convention on the Elimination of All Forms of Discrimination Against Women (CEDAW)
- History of feminism
- First-wave feminism
- List of suffragists and suffragettes
- Queen Isabella Association
