= Anna Simson =

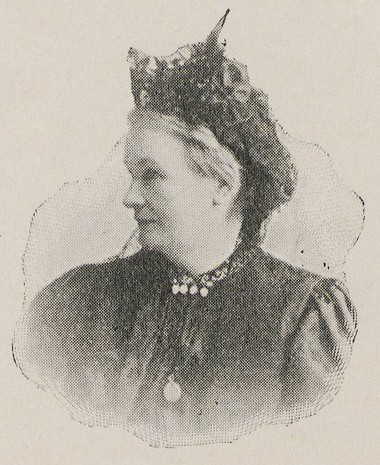
Anna Simson as depicted in Program of 1899 International Congress of Women at which she was a representative of Germany

Anna Simson, née Haberkern (20 August 1835, Werder – 14 March 1916, Lubiąż Abbey, Silesia) was a German women's rights activist.

In 1893 she attended the founding of the World's Congress of Representative Women meeting on the occasion of the 1893 World's Columbian Exposition in Chicago. She was accompanied by Auguste Förster, Hanna Bieber-Böhm and Käthe Schirmacher. They took the example of the American National Council of Women as inspiration for founding the Bund Deutscher Frauenvereine (BDF – Federation of German Women's Associations). She became the first secretary of the BDF and was later Deputy Chairwoman. In that capacity she corresponded with Teresa Wilson, the secretary to Lady Aberdeen leader of the International Council of Women. Here she expressed the differing aspirations of the BDF who considered that Aberdeen's leadership was too disorganised and showed too much of a class orientation in favour of the aristocracy.

“The German women’s movement is a thoroughly ‘bourgeois’ one and as a women’s movement rejects all mere charity work by aristocrats, the conservatives, and the Church.”

Within the BDF Anna was aligned with the moderates who were worried about a more radical group emerging.
