= Bund Deutscher Frauenvereine =

The Bund Deutscher Frauenvereine (Federation of German Women's Associations) (BDF) was founded on 28/29 March 1894 as umbrella organization of the women's civil rights feminist movement and existed until the Nazi seizure of power in 1933.

Its creation was inspired by the founding of the World's Congress of Representative Women meeting on the occasion of the 1893 World's Columbian Exposition in Chicago. Several women from Germany attended this event: Anna Simson, Hanna Bieber-Böhm, Auguste Förster, Käthe Schirmacher. They took the example of the American National Council of Women as a model for the BDF. The International Council of Women also played a role in strengthening the co-operation between the NCW and the BDF.

== Governance ==
Chairwoman	period of service
Auguste Schmidt	1894–9
Marie Stritt	1899–1910
Gertrud Bäumer	1910–1919
Marianne Weber	1919–1924
Emma Ender	1924–1931
Agnes von Zahn-Harnack	1931–1933

Deputy Chairwoman	period of service
Anna Schepeler-Lette	1894–?
Anna Simson	?–?
Gertrud Bäumer	1919–1933

The first board was composed of:

- Auguste Schmidt
- Anna Schepeler-Lette, Chairperson of the Latvian Club
- Anna Simson
- Hanna Bieber-Böhm as chairwoman of the association for the protection of minors Representative of the morality movement
- Auguste Förster
- Ottilie Hoffmann, temperance activist
- Helene von Forster, chairwoman of the Nuremberg Association Women's Welfare
- Helene Lange
- Betty Naue

In 1896 they were joined by:

- Jeanette Schwerin, Head of girls and women's groups for social work
- Marie Stritt, Founder of the first legal protection association for women in Germany

== Constituent groups ==
Among others, the Reifensteiner Association was among the members.

== History ==
=== Nazi period ===
In 1933, the Nazis rose to power, and asserted control over women's associations. Groups involving communists or socialists were forbidden, and members were arrested or even assassinated in rare cases. All associations were asked to turn in Jewish members, including the Union of Protestant Women, the Association for Home and Countryside, the Union of German Colonial Women, and the Union of Queen Louise. Soon enough, however, the majority of the organizations were either forcibly destroyed or decided internally to disband, like the BDF which dissolved itself in 1933 to avoid being controlled. Some of the affiliated associations joined the Deutsches Frauenwerk.

== Membership ==
Membership steadily grew in the first twenty years:

- 1895 : 65 chapters
- 1901 : 137 chapters and 70,000 members
- 1913 : 2200 chapters and 500,000 members

== Articles ==
- Women in the Third Reich
- Deutsches Frauenwerk
- Frauenschaft
