= Auguste Förster =

German educationalist and feminist (1848–1926)

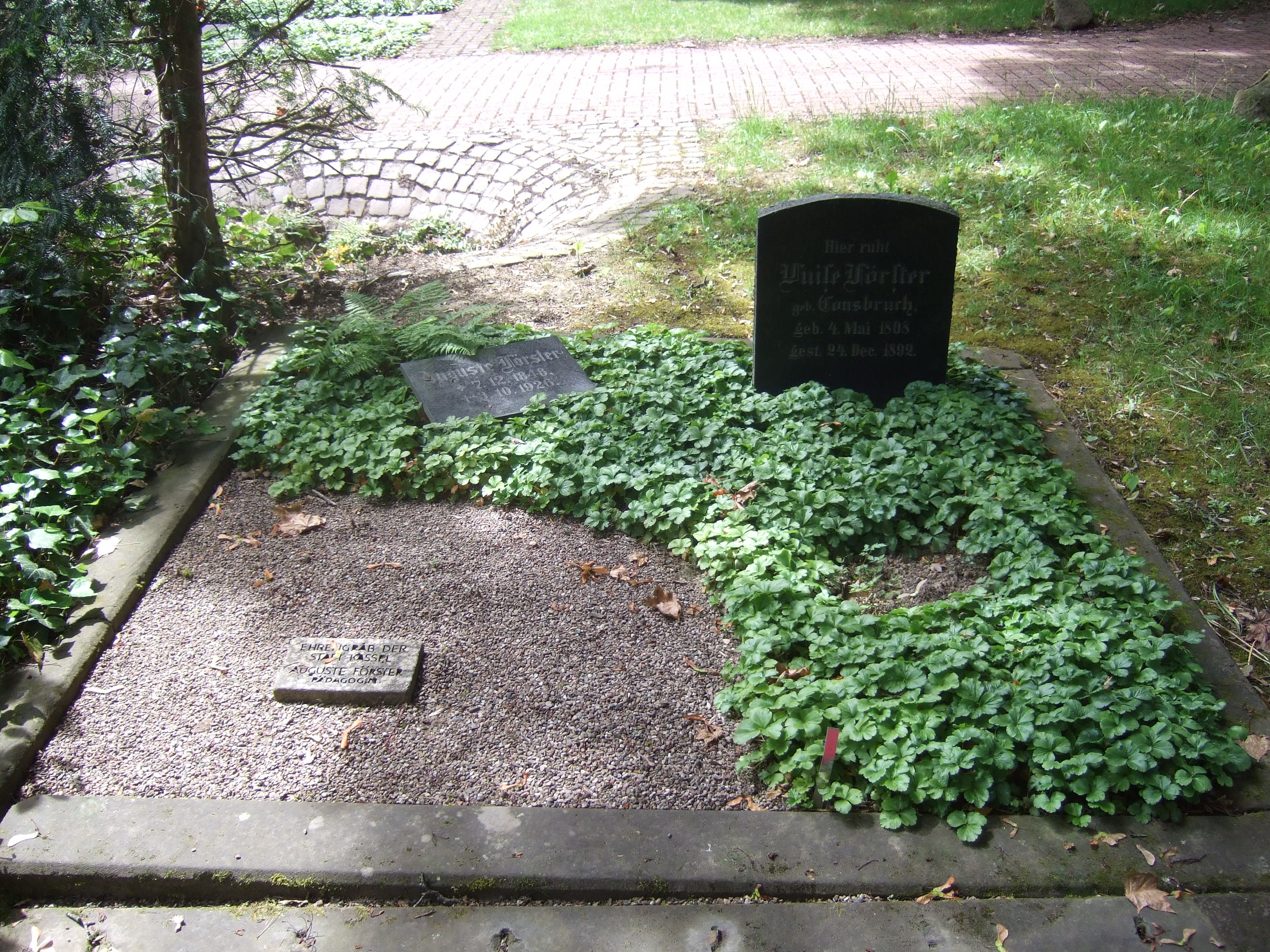
Grave of Auguste Förster, Hauptfriedhof, Kassel

Auguste Förster (7 December 1848, Warburg – 3 October 1926, Brunswick) was a German educationalist and activist in the bourgeois women's movement. She was founder of the Kassel Organization of Women's Groups (Gründerin des Verbandes Kassler Frauenvereine).

In 1893 she attended the founding of the World's Congress of Representative Women meeting on the occasion of the 1893 World's Columbian Exposition in Chicago. She was accompanied by Anna Simson, Hanna Bieber-Böhm and Käthe Schirmacher. They took the example of the American National Council of Women as inspiration for founding the Bund Deutscher Frauenvereine (Federation of German Women's Associations), of which Auguste became one of the founding board members.
