= Corinne Stubbs Brown =

American Marxist social activist

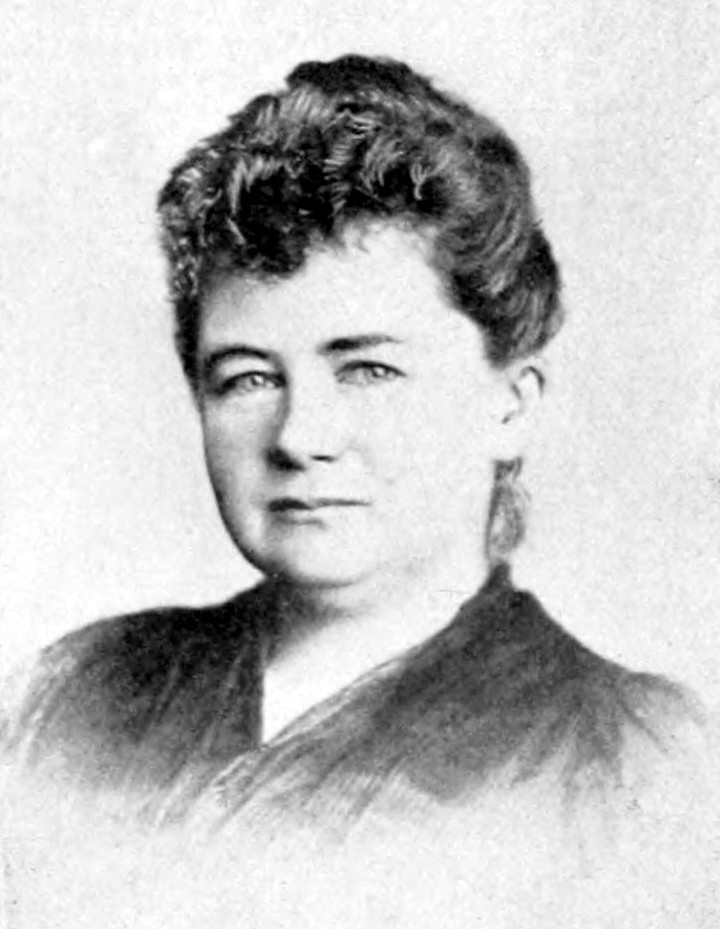
- Corinne Stubbs Brown, from A Woman of the Century (1893)
- Born: Corinne Stubbs; 1849; Chicago, Illinois, United States
- Died: 1914 (aged 64–65)
- Occupations: Social activist, educator
- Organizations: Illinois Women's Alliance (president); Ladies Federal Labor Union; Nationalist movement; Queen Isabella Association
- Known for: Leadership in socialist and women's labour reform movements
- Movement: Socialism
- Spouse: Frank E. Brown
- Parent(s): Jane McWilliams; Timothy R. Stubbs

Corinne Stubbs Brown (1849 – 1914) was an American Marxist social activist.

Born in Chicago, 1849, she taught in its public schools. Brown became a student of social problems and a socialist of some prominence. She served as president of the Illinois Women's Alliance for the purpose of obtaining the enactment and enforcement of factory ordinances and compulsory educational laws. She was also an active worker in the study of economic and social questions among women's clubs.

== Early years ==
Corinne Stubbs was born in Chicago, Illinois, in 1849. Her mother, Jane McWilliams, was born in London, England, and when a child, was aware of the part taken by her elder brothers in the repeal of the Corn Laws of England. Coming to the United States when she was the seventeen years old, she met and was married to Timothy R. Stubbs, the father of Corinne. He was from Maine, a stair-builder by trade, and a man of strong and somewhat the domineering character. His idea of parental duty led him to keep strict watch on his daughters. He forbade the reading of fiction and insisted on regular attendance at the Swedenborgian Church. The latter command was obeyed, but the former was, by Corinne, considered unreasonable and therefore disregarded. She acquired her education in the public schools of Chicago.

== Career ==
After her graduation, she taught in the public schools of Chicago. Good order and discipline were the rule in her department, and her governing ability led in the time to her appointment as principal, a post which she relinquished after marrying Frank E. Brown, a businessman who was an officer of various enterprises.

During a quiet period of the domestic life succeeding her marriage, Brown's active mind prepared itself for new fields of thought and research, and she eagerly seized upon social problems. She read, studied and talked with those who had investigated the causes of the inequalities in social position, and of the increasing number of immense fortunes on the one hand and pauperism on the other. For a time, she affiliated with the Single Tax Party, but its methods did not satisfy her as being adequate to effect the social revolution necessary to banish involuntary poverty. After much research, she accepted socialism as the true remedy and Karl Marx as its apostle. Out of this naturally grew her desire to work for the helpless and oppressed, especially among women. She joined the Ladies Federal Labor Union, identifying herself with working women and gaining an insight into their needs. In 1888, a meeting of that society was called to take action on an exposure of the wrongs of factory employees made in a daily paper. The result of the meeting was the organization of the Illinois Women's Alliance to obtain the enforcement and enactment of factory ordinances and of the compulsory education laws. As president of that society, which included delegates from the twenty-eight organizations of women, Brown became widely known. In addition to her work in the Alliance, Brown was connected with the Nationalists, the Queen Isabella Association and other societies, chiefly those having for their object the advancement of women. She died in 1914.
