= Novella Jewell Trott =

American author and editor (1846–1929)

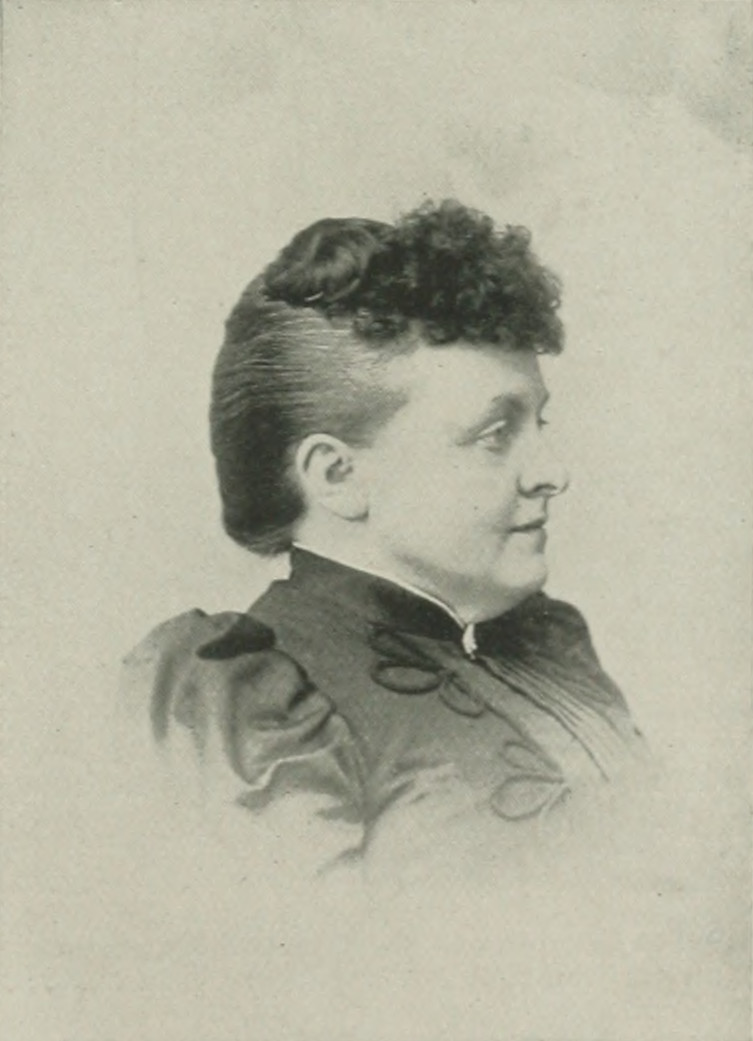
- Photo in A Woman of the Century
- Born: November 16, 1846; Woolwich, Maine, U.S.
- Died: May 29, 1929 (aged 82); Woolwich, Maine
- Resting place: Riverside Cemetery, Woolwich, Maine
- Education: State Normal School at Farmington (now University of Maine at Farmington)
- Occupations: author; editor

Novella Jewell Trott (November 16, 1846 – May 29, 1929) was an American author and editor. She worked on the editorial staff of the E. C. Allen publishing company and served as sole editor of Practical Housekeeper and Daughters of America. In 1893, she served as vice-president for the Woman's Press Department of the World's Columbian Exposition, in Chicago.

== Early life and education ==
Novella Jewell Trott (Note: Prescott (1956) gives Trott's middle name as Jane.) was born in Woolwich, Maine, November 16, 1846. She was the daughter of Alfred and Olive Turner (Farnham) Trott. She traced her ancestry back to the Puritan emigrant, Thomas Trott, who came from England to Dorchester, Massachusetts, in 1635, and to Ralph Farnham, who, in the same year, settled in Andover, Massachusetts. Benjamin Trott and Joshua Farnham, descendants of the above, both removed to Woolwich about 1750, and there founded families whose children, from generation to generation, were noted for their intelligence, integrity and public spirit. Her siblings included, Lemuel Garland, Julia Elizabeth, Fanny Farnham, Ruth Shirley, Alice Gertrude, and Alfred Everett.

At the age of thirteen, when Trott had outgrown the public schools of her native town, she entered the public schools of Bath, Maine, afterward taking a special course of study in the State Normal School at Farmington (now University of Maine at Farmington).

== Career ==
Early on, Trott showed an inclination towards literature, and she had intended to make teaching her profession. During a visit to Boston, she was invited to take a position as proofreader in a prominent publishing house. There, she had her introduction to the work which she was afterwards to adopt as a profession. A sudden illness compelled her to give up her position and, upon her recovery, she resumed her original plans and taught successfully for several years. The five following years were devoted to the care of her invalid mother, after which circumstances allowed for her return to literary life.

In 1881, she began working for the publishing establishment of E. C. Allen, in Augusta, Maine, where she soon worked her way to a position upon the editorial staff. She became sole editor of the Practical Housekeeper and Daughters of America. From 1883, she performed all branches of editorial work, selecting, compiling, condensing, revising, writing from month to month editorial, critical and literary articles, reading a large number of manuscripts and conducting the extensive correspondence of her office. She was appointed one of seven women of national reputation to represent the press department of the Queen Isabella Association in the World's Columbian Exposition, in Chicago, in 1893. In the following year, she was associated with W. H. Gannett, in Augusta, Maine, as assistant editor and proofreader.

== Death ==
Novella Jewell Trott died May 29, 1929, in Woolwich, and was buried at the city's Riverside Cemetery. Her parents were buried there, too.
