= Fanny Zampini Salazar =

Belgian-born Italian writer, editor and lecturer

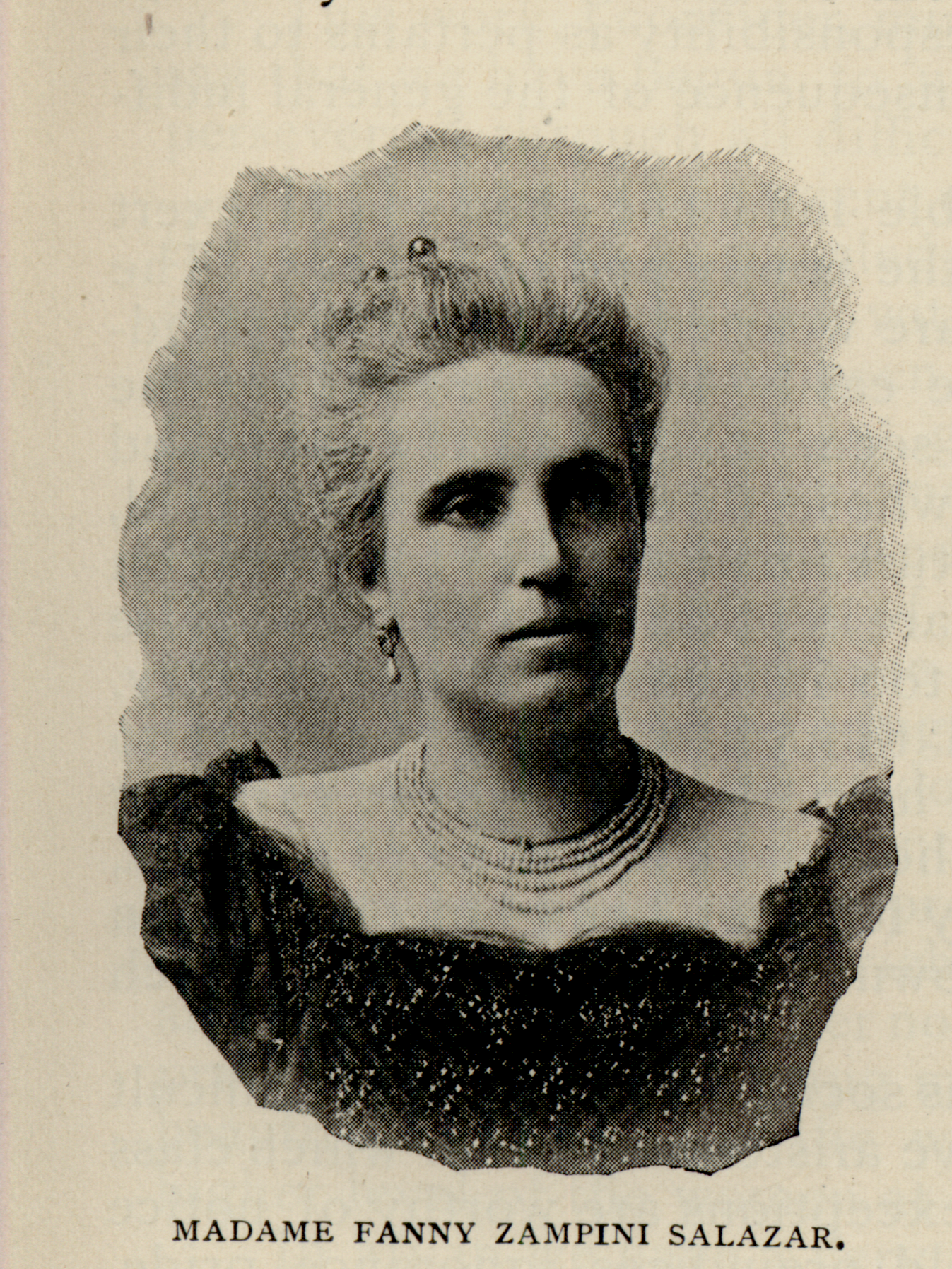
Fanny Zampini Salazar

Fanny Zampini Salazar (also Fanny Salazar Zampini; 11 May 1853 – Naples, 1931) was a Belgian-born Italian writer, editor, and lecturer. Salazar was the writer of a large number of works dealing with many issues connected with the progress made by Italy. On numerous occasions she lectured on such subjects in England and in the United States. She was also the editor of Rassegna Femminile.

== Biography ==
Fanny Zampini Salazar was born in Brussels, 11 May 1853, daughter of Demetro Salazar. She traveled in England, studying the industrial institutions for women in that country, made a report to the government of Italy which was favorably received and an appointment was given her for like service in America. At one time, she published a paper, "The Queen", in the interest of Italian women, for whom she had been a zealous worker, in an effort to raise industrial and intellectual standards. Among her published works are, A Glance at the Future of Woman in Italy, Life and Labors of Demetro Salazar, Guides to Physical and Moral Health of Italian Children, Old Struggles and New Hopes. She was sent as an Italian representative to the World's Congress of Representative Women in Chicago in 1898. She was also elected one of the judges of awards of the World's Columbian Exposition.
