= Queen Isabella Association =

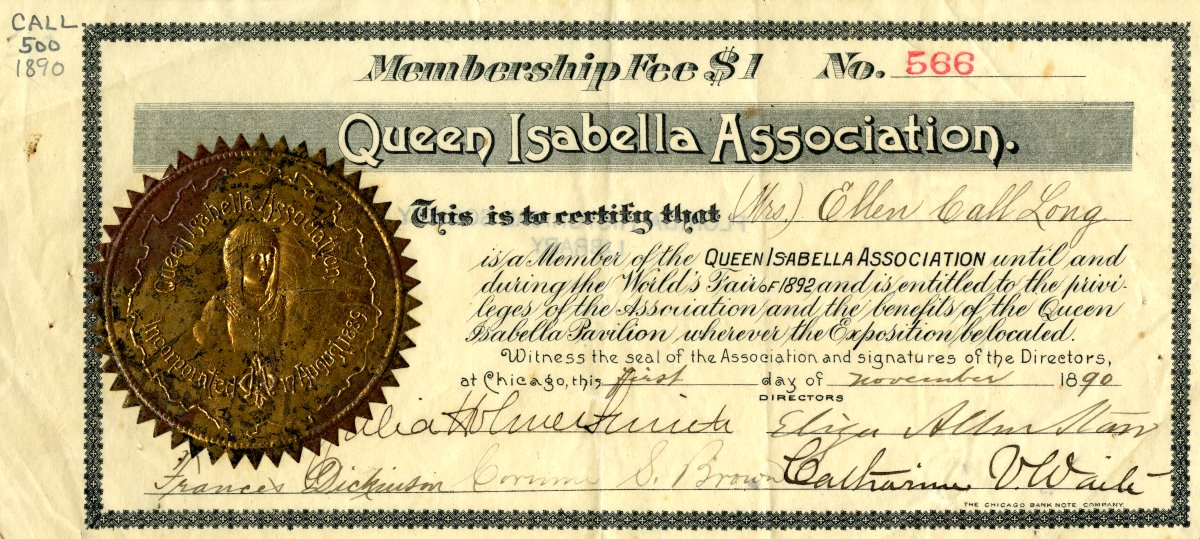
Queen Isabella Association membership certificate for Ellen Call Long

The Queen Isabella Association was formed to raise funds to provide a statue of Queen Isabella of Spain on the site of the 1893 World's Columbian Exposition in Chicago, Illinois. The group's additional purpose was to advance the cause of women's suffrage and equal rights.

== Background ==
Beginning at the end of the 1880s, plans were being prepared to create an exposition celebrating the 400th anniversary of the discovery of America by Europeans (the quadro-centential). Women were organizing to become part of this exposition. Several cities were competing to host the exposition. The front-runners were Chicago, New York, St. Louis, and Washington, D.C. By 1890 Chicago was selected as the site of the Exposition. At the same time, Congress decreed that there would be a Board of Lady Managers to address and organize the inclusion of women in the World's Columbian Exposition. Drs. Frances Dickinson and Lucy Waite were the originators of the Queen Isabella Association.

== Beginnings of the Queen Isabella Association ==
As part of the run-up to the Exposition a group of professional women organized to bring their views of woman's place in society to the Exposition. The group believed that women were equal to men and were capable of pursuing professional careers outside the home. The group took as their inspiration Queen Isabella of Spain, who had made Columbus' voyage to the New World possible. Illinois Woman Suffrage Association founder Catharine Van Valkenburg Waite first suggested the idea of erecting a statue of Isabella.

The Queen Isabella Association originally incorporated in Chicago in 1889. It soon expanded to chapters in New York, St. Louis, and Washington, D.C. This expansion into a national organization was an attempt to have a voice outside Chicago advocating for the Exposition's site selection in Chicago.

== Membership ==
Women could enroll in the Association for one dollar and could also buy shares for five dollars, to raise money for the statue.

=== Founding members ===
- President: Dr. Julia Holmes Smith
- Vice President: Eliza Allen Starr
- Treasurer: Catharine Van Valkenburg Waite
- Corinne Stubbs Brown
- Frances Hale Gardener
- Dr. Frances Dickinson

== Ideology ==
Members of the Queen Isabella Association were mostly professional women, part of the New Woman movement, who believed that women should take an equal part in society, working in professions alongside men.

== Controversy ==
Members of the Association were referred to as "Isabellas". Their suffragist ideology was different from many other women's groups in Chicago, including the Chicago Women's Auxiliary. The Chicago Women's Auxiliary focus was on philanthropic work, making life better for poor women and children by improving education and sanitary conditions. They believed that women could serve society, but should deport themselves as ladies. This difference would carry over into how women wanted women represented at the Exposition. Specifically there were strong desires on each side to gain a position on the Board of Lady Managers. Phoebe Couzins, an Isabella, was elected as the Board Secretary. Her position was soon undermined by the Board's president Bertha Palmer, a well connected Chicago socialite. Palmer rewrote the minutes of the first meeting, including altering the bylaws to give the board president more decision-making power. When Couzins complained she was removed from office.

== Queen Isabella Association at the Exposition ==
As the planning of the Exposition continued the Isabellas were marginalized, finally reduced to having the Isabella Club House outside the fairgrounds It was located at 61st and Oglesby Avenue. The Isabellas also ran the Isabella Hotel in the property next door. They held the "Meeting of Women Lawyers" at the Club House on August 3–5, 1983.

=== The sculpture of Queen Isabella ===
The group commissioned the statue from sculptor Harriet Hosmer, herself a member of the Queen Isabella Society. Hosmer completed the statue, but the Isabellas did not have the funds to purchase it. She rejected an offer from Bertha Palmer to purchase the statue for the Woman's Building and instead sold it to Harriet Williams Russell Strong who had it placed outside the Pampas Place of the California Building at the World's Columbian Exposition.

== Gallery ==
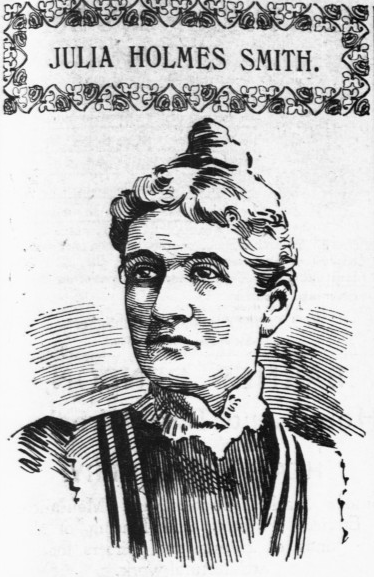
Julia Holmes Smith

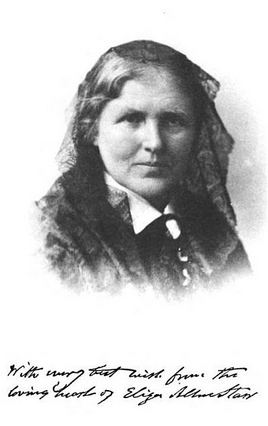
Eliza Allen Starr

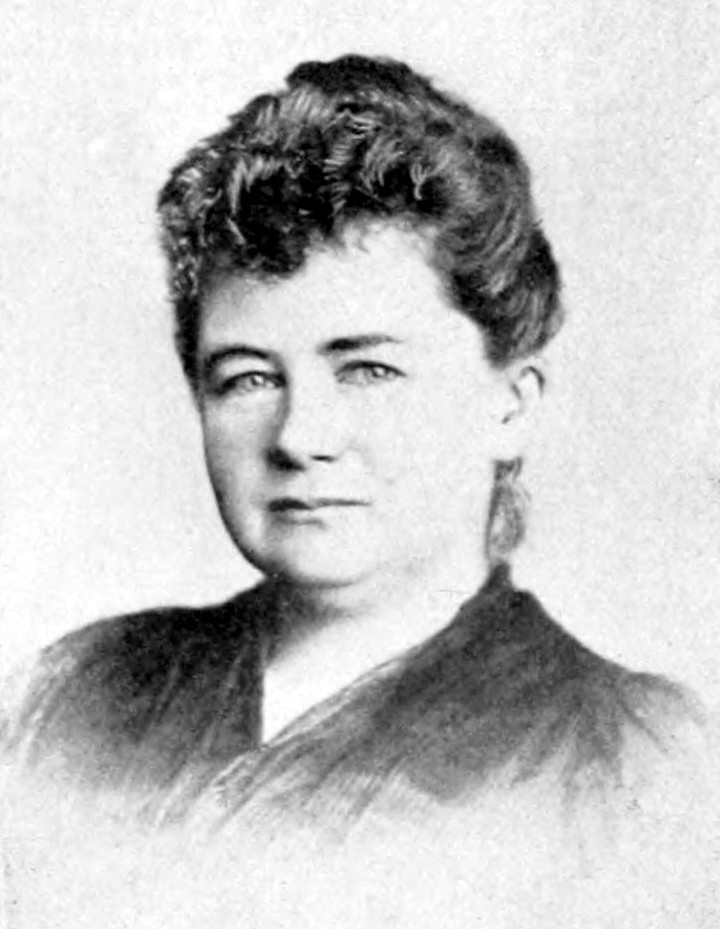
Corinne Stubbs Brown

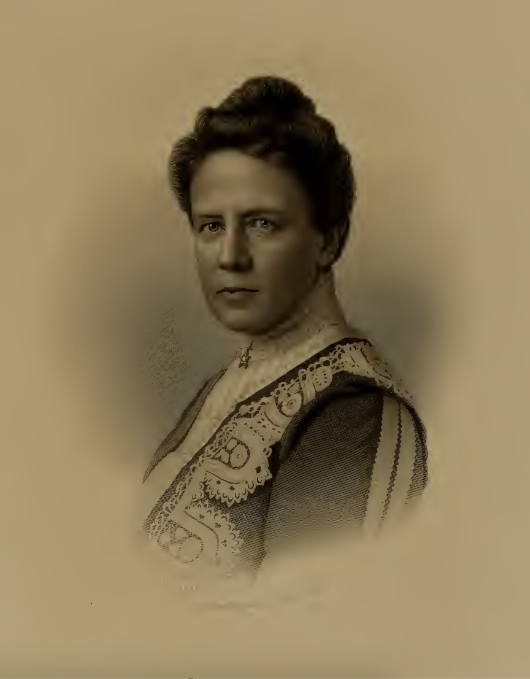
Frances Dickinson

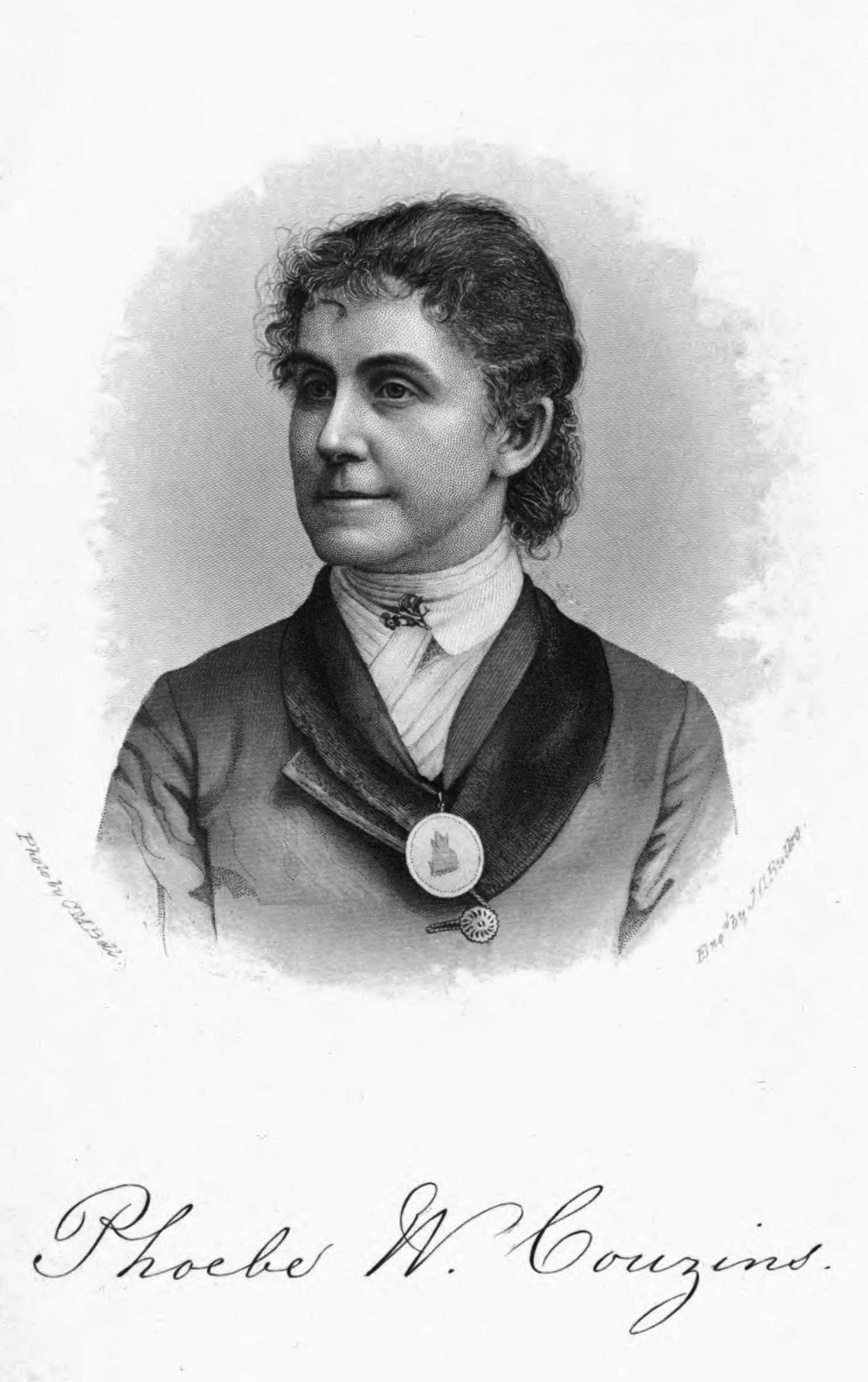
Phoebe Couzins

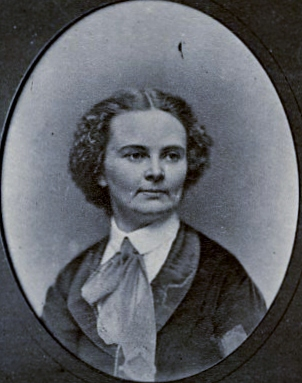
Harriet Hosmer

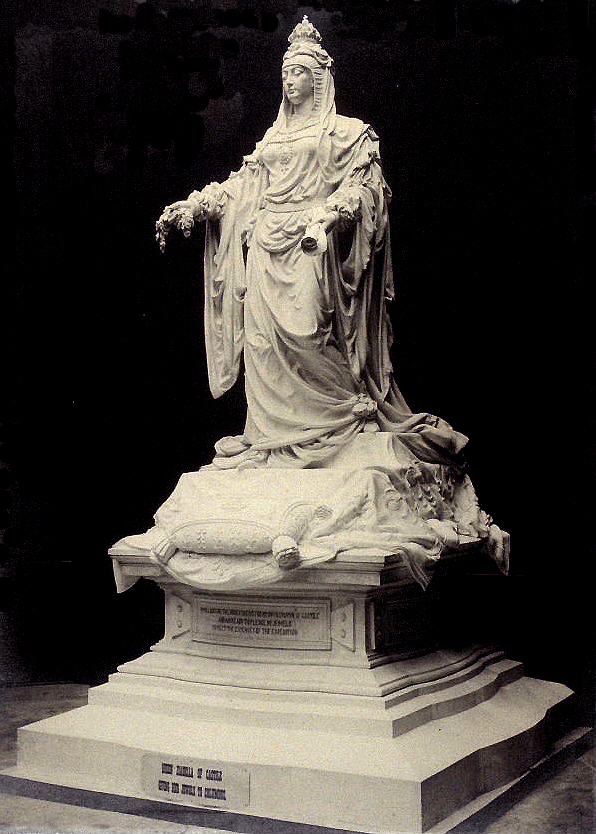
Queen Isabella by Harriet Hosmer c. 1893

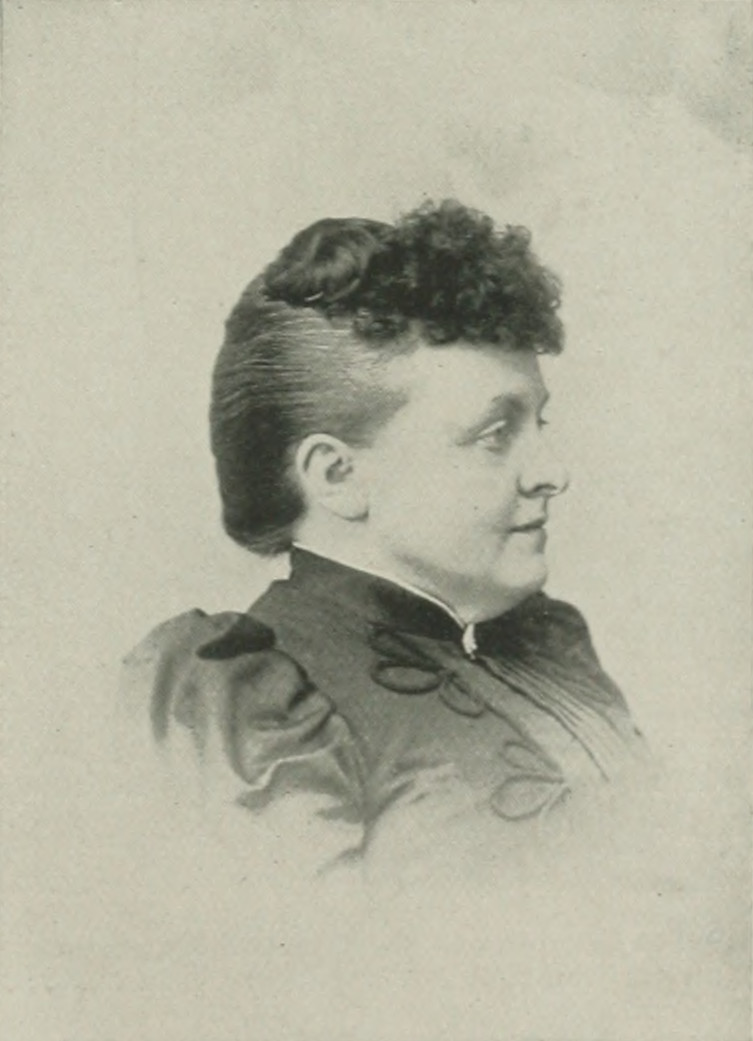
Novella Jewell Trott
