= Hanna Bieber-Böhm =

German feminist and pioneer of social work (1851–1910)

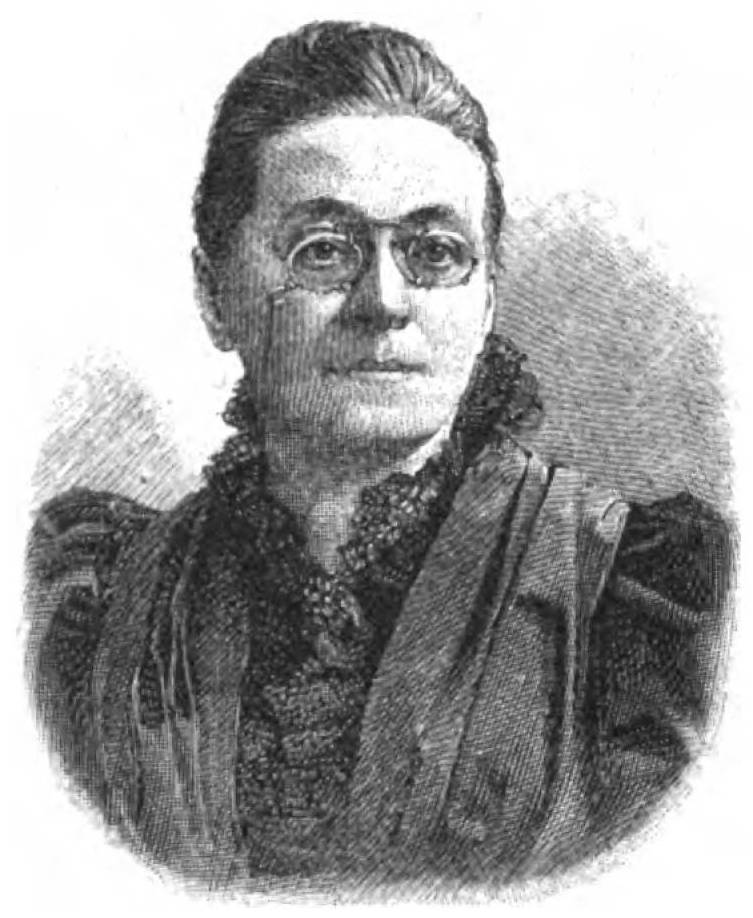
- Engraving from a photograph 1899
- Born: Hanna Elmire Flora Böhm; 6 February 1851; Glaubitten, East Prussia
- Died: 15 April 1910 (aged 59); Berlin, Germany
- Occupations: Feminist, social worker

Hanna Bieber-Böhm (6 February 1851 – 15 April 1910) was a German feminist and pioneer of social work. She established an organization to assist young women seeking work in Berlin and help protect them from becoming prostitutes, and founded a recreation home for women where they could also be trained in housework and gardening. She was in favor of combating prostitution through strong laws penalizing the clients of prostitutes.

== Early life ==
Hanna Elmire Flora Böhm was born in Glaubitten, East Prussia, (Note: Glaubitten is now Glowbity in the administrative district of Gmina Korsze in northern Poland.) on 6 February 1851. She was the eldest of eight children of the landowner Otto Böhm and his wife Bertha. Her mother died in 1870, and Hanna had to assume the maternal role. After her father married again in 1874 she became free to devote herself to art.

Hanna Böhm went to Berlin to study painting, and would practice this art for the rest of her life. Her early work includes portraits of her family and views of the family house in Glaubitten. She traveled to study art in Italy, Tunisia, Greece and Constantinople. Her ink drawings, watercolors and paintings of everyday scenes and people from this period have been preserved. Her portraits, genre paintings and landscapes sold well in Germany, Italy and North America. She was represented with three oil paintings at the exhibitions of the Konigsberg Art Association in 1883 and 1887. Bieber-Böhm exhibited her work at the Woman's Building at the 1893 World's Columbian Exposition in Chicago, Illinois. She was also part of the German delegation to the Women's Congress at the Exposition.

In 1888, when she was thirty-seven, Hanna married the lawyer Richard Bieber (born 1858), whom she had met while studying in Berlin. He was seven years her junior. Bieber was Jewish in origin, but had become Christian. He wanted to marry in St. Mary's Church, but Protestant pastors refused a church wedding. This caused Hanna Böhm to reject the Protestant church. The couple had a civil marriage and remained childless.

== Political activity ==
After her marriage Hanna Bieber Böhm remained a member of the Association of Berlin artists, but her painting became a secondary activity as she became interested in politics. Germany under chancellor Prince Otto von Bismarck was growing both economically and in population, and various associations and clubs had been formed to address social issues. Bieber-Böhm became involved in the movement fighting for women's rights, which was concerned with morality, prostitution, protection of children and other issues. The feminists often handed petitions to the German Reichstag for changes in women's status and equal rights to men.

In 1889 Bieber-Böhm founded the Jugendschutz (Youth Protection) association in Berlin. This gave support to girls looking for accommodation and help in finding work. Later she added a crèche and kindergarten. The main goal was to protect young women with no family in Berlin from prostitution. The Jugendschutz educated young Germans on the virtues of temperance and chastity, taught them to shun places of lax entertainment and to avoid promiscuity and alcoholicism, vices that she saw as closely connected. In the two homes for single impecunious girls that she established, and later in the convalescent home, the consumption of alcohol was prohibited. The homes were connected with housekeeping schools to prepare the residents for later life.

In 1893 Bieber-Böhm was a representative of the Allgemeine Deutsche Frauenverein (ADF: German Women's Association) at the first general assembly of the International Council of Women and the World's Fair in Chicago, US. Other German delegates were Auguste Förster, Elisabeth Kaselowsky, Agnes Burchard, Annette Hamminck Schepel, Marie Fischer-Lette and Käthe Schirmacher. In 1894, representing Jugendschutz, she participated in foundation of the Bund Deutscher Frauenvereine (BDF: Federation of German Women's Associations) in Berlin. This was an umbrella organization campaigning for improvements to family law, protection of female workers, protection of children and other causes. She was a board member of the BDF from 1894 to 1905.

Hanna Bieber-Böhm was a co-founder of the girls secondary school in Berlin-Charlottenburg, which was later taken over by the city. In 1902 she bought a two-story building on the Priorberg in Neuzelle for the Jugendschutz. The location was quiet and far from Berlin, and was used as a vacation home for girls in poor health, mothers with children and older women. Attached to it was a housekeeping and horticultural school, so women could be trained to find work on their return to Berlin. Financing came from sponsors, particularly Jews. In 1908 the building had 120 guests. Bieber-Böhm continued to live in Berlin, but visited the school regularly.

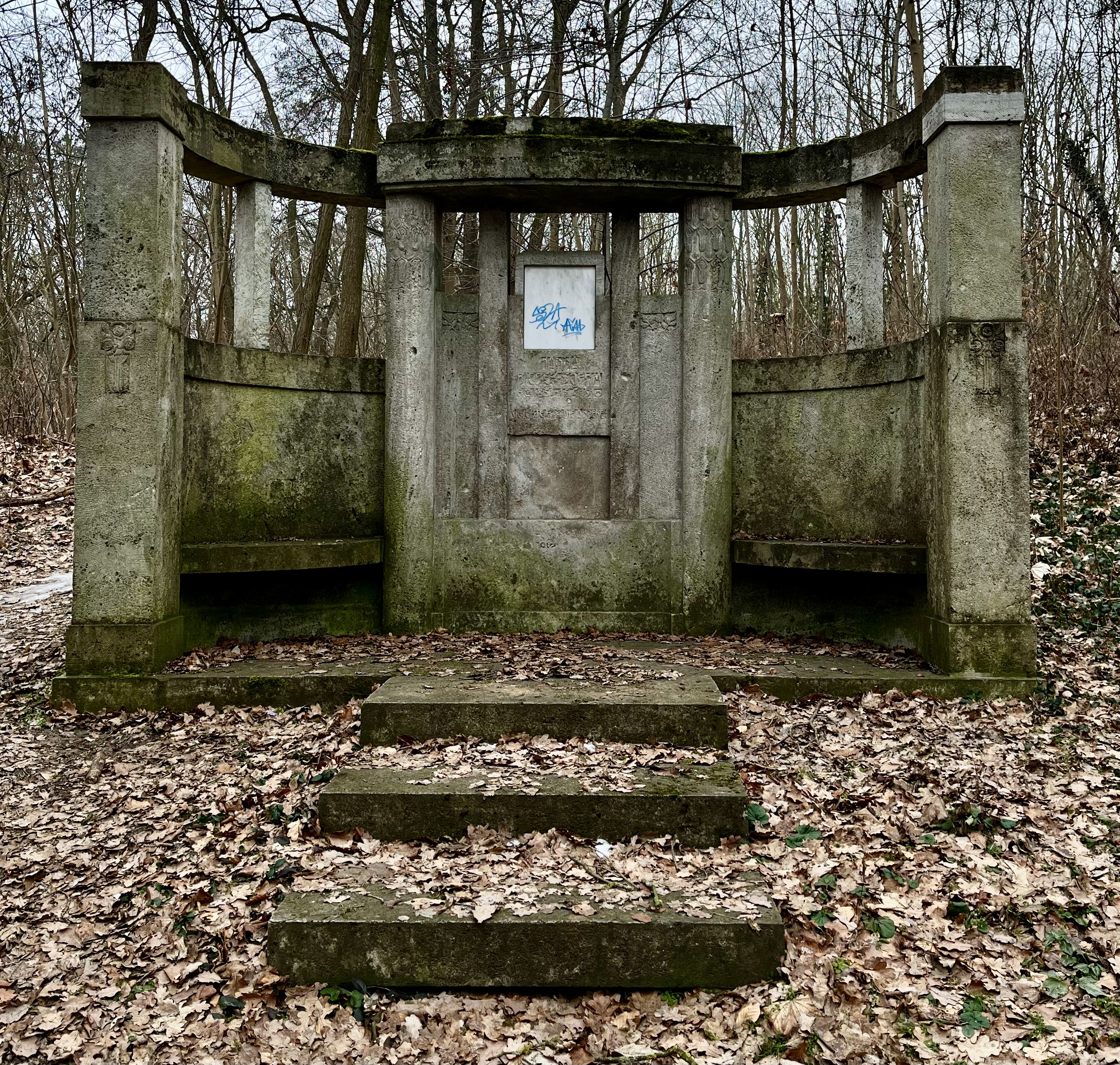
The tomb near Neuzelle

She died in Berlin on 15 April 1910 after a short illness, aged fifty-nine. Her body was cremated and placed in an Art Nouveau style tomb near the Neuzelle rest home.

== Beliefs ==
Bieber-Böhm thought clean living and morality were bourgeois virtues, which the bourgeoisie should impose on others. The upper classes were self-indulgent to excess, and the poor were ignorant and immoral, underfed and alcoholic.

In Germany there was fierce debate among feminists about how to handle prostitution, seen as the source of venereal diseases and thus a major health problem. Hanna Bieber-Böhm, Anna Pappritz (1861–1939) and Helene Stöcker (1869–1943) advocated different solutions. Bieber-Böhm favoured stronger legal action by the state against the clients of prostitutes. Pappritz and Stöcker were both opposed to state surveillance and control of prostitutes. Pappritz proposed moral education of young people and encouragement of abstinence outside marriage, while Stocker thought that giving women more sexual freedom would eliminate the demand for prostitution.

At first the mainstream feminists shunned Bieber-Böhm because she spoke openly about prostitution. However, after the 1891 Heinze trial (Note: In 1891 Gotthilf Rudolph Heinze tried for murder of a nightwatchman during a burglary of a church. It emerged that he was a pimp for his own wife. The sensational case aroused huge public interest and controversy. Eventually, after ten years, the Lex Heinze was passed defining punishments for pimping and much higher punishments for pimping by a husband.) provoked moral outrage, Bieber-Böhm gained support from feminists for her petition to the parliament of Germany entitled "Suggestions for the Fight against Prostitution". In this petition Bieber-Böhm said the system of state regulation of prostitution did not help prevent venereal disease from spreading, and registration of prostitutes legitimized their occupation. She did not want to legalize the practice, but wanted "older, honorable, educated women" to be given responsibility for monitoring, punishing and rehabilitating prostitutes and their clients, both of whom would be subject to imprisonment for one or two years. She also said that doctors should be forced to publicly disclose the status of patients infected with venereal diseases.

== Work ==
Published work includes:

- Dunkle Bilder (Dark Images) (paintings of silhouettes) – Volume 1, 1874
- Dunkle Bilder (Dark Images) (paintings of silhouettes) – Volume 2, 1881
- Märchenbilder (Fairytale images) after 1881
- 26.000 Schlafstellen! Ein Hilferuf... Gefahren der ersten Kinderjahre (26,000 beds! A cry for help ... hazards of the first years of childhood) Printed from a presentation made in 1890
- Vorschläge zur Bekämpfung der Prostitution (Suggestions for the Fight against Prostitution) printed from a presentation in 1895
- Die Sittlichkeitsfrage, eine Gesundheitsfrage (The morality issue, a health issue) printed from a presentation in 1896

== Sources ==
- "Bieber-Böhm, Hanna". Freie Universität Berlin. 2012-09-15.
- Bürger, Klaus (2014). "Bieber-Böhm, Hanna Elmire Flora". Kulturportal West-Ost.
- "Hanna Bieber-Böhm-Denkmal". Stift Neuzelle. Beeskow: Kreiskalender Landkreis Oder-Spree 2012. 2011.
- Heberer, Eva-Maria (2013-12-06). Prostitution: An Economic Perspective on its Past, Present, and Future. Springer Science & Business Media. ISBN 978-3-658-04496-1.
- Smith, Jill Suzanne (2014-02-28). Berlin Coquette: Prostitution and the New German Woman, 1890–1933. Cornell University Press. ISBN 978-0-8014-6970-1.
