= Julia Holmes Smith =

American physician (1839–1930)

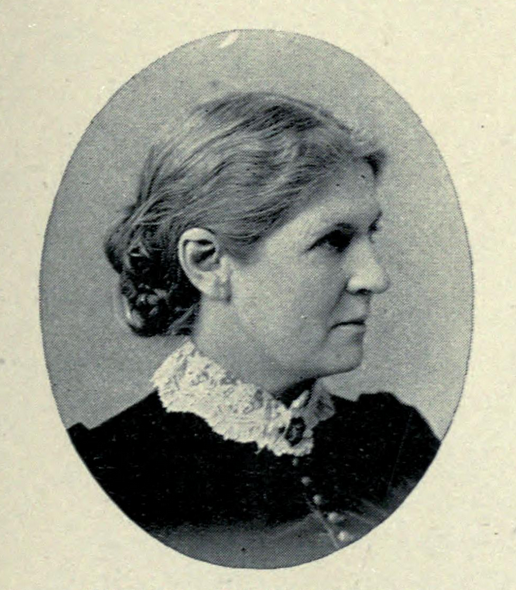
Julia Holmes Smith, 1893

Julia Holmes Smith (December 23, 1839 – November 10, 1930) was an American physician, publisher, and suffragist from Georgia. Born to a wealthy family, she received private tutoring then attended a women's school in New York City. Widowed at an early age, Smith remarried in 1872 and attended medical classes at the Boston University School of Medicine and Chicago Homeopathic Medical College. She opened a medical practice in Chicago, Illinois and was the first dean of the National Medical College. In 1895, she was appointed the first female trustee of the University of Illinois.

== Biography ==
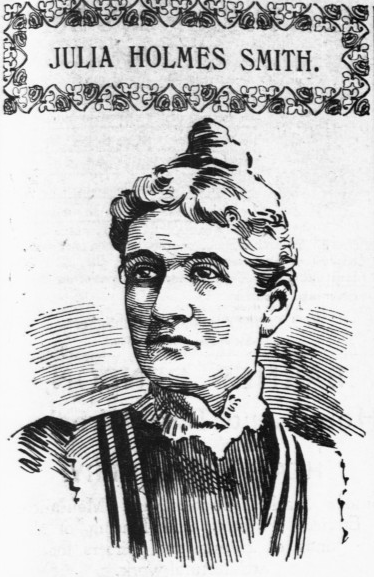
Julia Holmes Smith, July 28, 1900

Julia Holmes was born in 1839 in Savannah, Georgia, to a wealthy family. Holmes grew up in New Orleans, Louisiana, where she was tutored at home. She attended school in New York City, graduating from the Spingler Institute for Girls when she was eighteen. Holmes married Waldo Abbott, nephew of principal Gorham Dummer Abbott, in 1860. He died four years later of yellow fever, leaving a son and a daughter; the daughter died months later. To support herself in the meantime, Holmes taught school and published. She was the drama critic for the New Orleans Picayune.

In 1872, Holmes married wealthy merchant Sabin Smith and moved with him to Boston, Massachusetts. She attended Boston University School of Medicine from 1872 to 1874, then studied medicine in New York City. She moved to Chicago, Illinois, in 1876, where she completed her medical education at the Chicago Homeopathic Medical College, graduating in 1877.

Smith opened a medical practice specializing in general and medical gynecology. She also lectured on diseases of women at Chicago Homeopathic. Smith was the first dean of the National Medical College, serving three years. In 1886, she co-founded the Illinois Woman's Press Association in her home. She was a founding member of the Queen Isabella Association. She was on the board of directors of the Congress of Women of the World's Columbian Exposition of 1893. She unsuccessfully campaigned for a position as trustee, at the time an elected position, of the University of Illinois in 1894. However, the next year, Governor John Peter Altgeld named Smith as the school's first female trustee to fill a vacancy. Thanks to the success of Smith, eleven of the eighteen candidates for the university board the next year were women.

Smith was a fellow of the American Medical Association and a member of the American Institute of Homeopathy. She lived in Oak Park, Illinois. Smith retired in 1917 and died in 1930 in Winnetka, Illinois. She was cremated at Graceland Cemetery in Chicago.
