= Lucie Crain =

Lucie Crain (fl. 1891), was a German women's rights activist and educator. She played a significant part in the history of women's education in Germany. She is known as the founder of the Crainschen Anstalten in Berlin, often referred to as the leading Höhere Töchternschulen (women's college) in the German Empire.
