= Käthe Schirmacher =

German writer, journalist and political activist

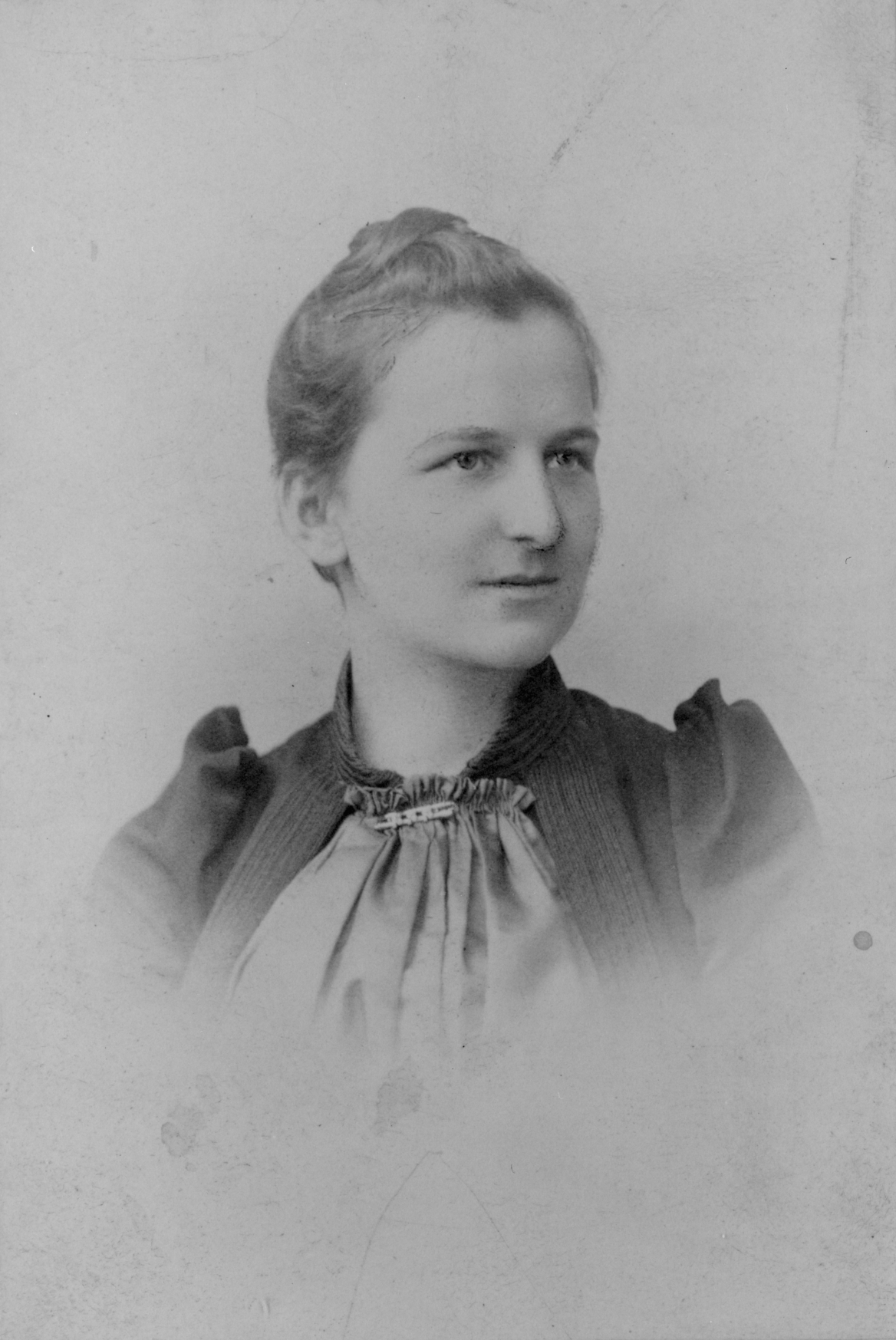
Käthe Schirmacher, 1893

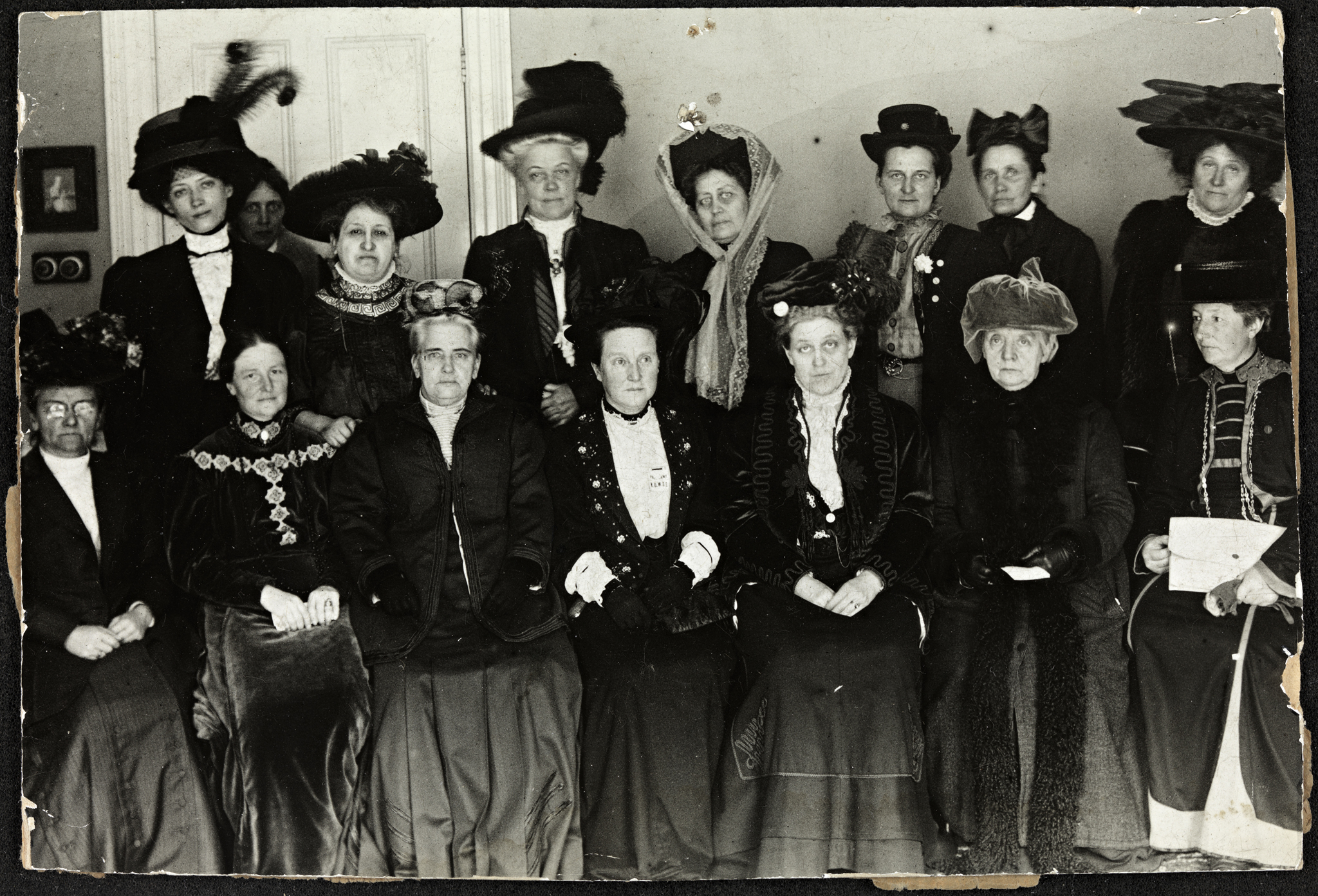
Suffrage Alliance Congress with Millicent Fawcett presiding, London 1909. Top row from left: Thora Daugaard (Denmark), Louise Qvam (Norway), Aletta Jacobs (Netherlands), Annie Furuhjelm (Finland), Madame Zénéide Mirovitch (Russia), Käthe Schirmacher (Germany), Madame Honneger, unidentified. Bottom left: Unidentified, Anna Bugge (Sweden), Anna Howard Shaw (USA), Millicent Fawcett (Presiding, England), Carrie Chapman Catt (USA), Fredrikke Marie Qvam (Norway), Anita Augspurg (Germany).

Käthe Schirmacher (Danzig, 6 August 1865 – Meran, 18 November, 1930) was a German writer, journalist, and political activist who was considered to be one of the leading advocates for women's rights and the international women's movement in the 1890s.

== Early life and feminism ==
Schirmacher was born on 6 August 1865 in Danzig, Kingdom of Prussia.

Käthe Schirmacher was the daughter of a wealthy merchant, but her family fortune was lost in the 1870s early on in her life. Schirmacher was one of the first women in Germany to earn a doctorate, studying at the Sorbonne and from Autumn of 1893 to the Spring of 1895 in Germany and earning her doctorate in Romance studies in Zürich under Heinrich Morf. Something that was unknown to the public was her homosexuality. Over the course of her life Schirmacher would have multiple partners, but her time in Zurich was spent with Margarethe Böhm.

In 1899, Schirmacher was one of the principal founders of the Association for Progressive Women's Organizations in Berlin. In 1904 she was also involved with the International Alliance of Women. During this period of time between the 1890s and the early 1900s, Schirmacher travelled around Europe and the United States and have lectures on German culture and women's issues. One of the things that Schirmacher wrote and lectured about was the idea of the "modern woman." In both her lectures and her personal writing, she expressed the necessary traits to be a modern woman; they are highlighted in Die moderne Frauenbewegung (The Modern Woman's Rights Movement, 1909).

The first was for in education and instruction, women should enjoy the same opportunities as men. The second dictated that in the field of labour, women should have the freedom to choose any occupation and to be compensated equally as any man. The third was that women should be given full legal status before the law and full civil ability. The fourth was in the social field: recognition of the value of women's work, whether in the home or in professional circles. They were extreme views for her time, but in 1904, Schirmacher pivoted to more extreme circles of political ideology and began expressing nationalist sentiments. It was the same year that Schirmacher began to break her ties with the leftist groups that she had founded, led and organised. In 1913, with the prospect of war and the wave of nationalism that was hitting Western Europe, Schirmacher broke her ties completely with the women's organisations.

== Volkisch Beliefs ==
At the outbreak of the World War I, Schirmacher was involved in the writing and publishing of German propaganda, mostly in the form of pamphlets, which were distributed across Germany and France, proclaiming her nationalist beliefs. Schirmacher lectured in Kiel in 1916, stating that 'intercourse with foreigners must be considerably reduced after the war, and our national dignity demands that we should purchase no foreign products'. Her traditional views, although contradictory of her radical views in the suffrage space, saw her arguing against the German popular interpretation of the New Woman, which favoured boyish styles and androgyny.

After the war, she was involved with the right-wing German National People's Party (DNVP). She shared their nationalist and antisemitic views. The group was very popular with women, and used women centrally in both their campaigns and their politics, on the basis that these should reflect the 'natural' roles of women. Schirmacher was a member of the DNVP's Völkisch committee. In a private writing in 1919, she noted that 'the only thing uniting us with Poland is our common hatred of Juda'.

In 1919-1920, Schirmacher, as a deputy to the National Assembly, was an early supporter of the 'Black Horror on the Rhine' conspiracy, a racist hate campaign against the use of French colonial soldiers in the occupation of the Rhineland. This was largely supported by other women in her party. She claimed that 'the lust of white, yellow and black Frenchmen for German women leads to daily violence'. This is not largely supported by historians, who have argued that the scale of 'violence' was far less than far-right and women's groups had been arguing throughout the height of the conspiracy.

Historians have said that she exemplifies the tradition between Volkisch beliefs and feminist ideas in the German National People's Party.

Schirmacher was also involved in the anti-democratic movement in the Weimar Republic. These views were shared on both the left and right wings of politics. Max Weber argued that the speed at which politicians fell out of favour with the public led to the rise of anti-parliamentarism and anti-democracy, and fed into a rise of far left or far right views.

== Published works ==
- The Libertad. Novella Publishing House Magazine, Zurich, 1891. 81 p.
- The International Women's Conference in Chicago 1893. A lecture held in which the intellectuals and leaders of the International Women's Movement (IWM) gathered. Schirmacher was one of the lecturers featured.
- Le Féminisme Aux États-Unis, En France, Dans La Grande-Bretagne, En Suède Et En Russie: Questions Du Temps Présent (1898)
- Die Frauenbewegung, "The Women's Movement, Their Causes and Means" (1902)
- Die moderne Frauenbewegung (The Modern Woman's Rights Movement, 1909)
- Die Suffragettes (1912)
