= Student activism =

Work by students to cause political, environmental, economic, or social change

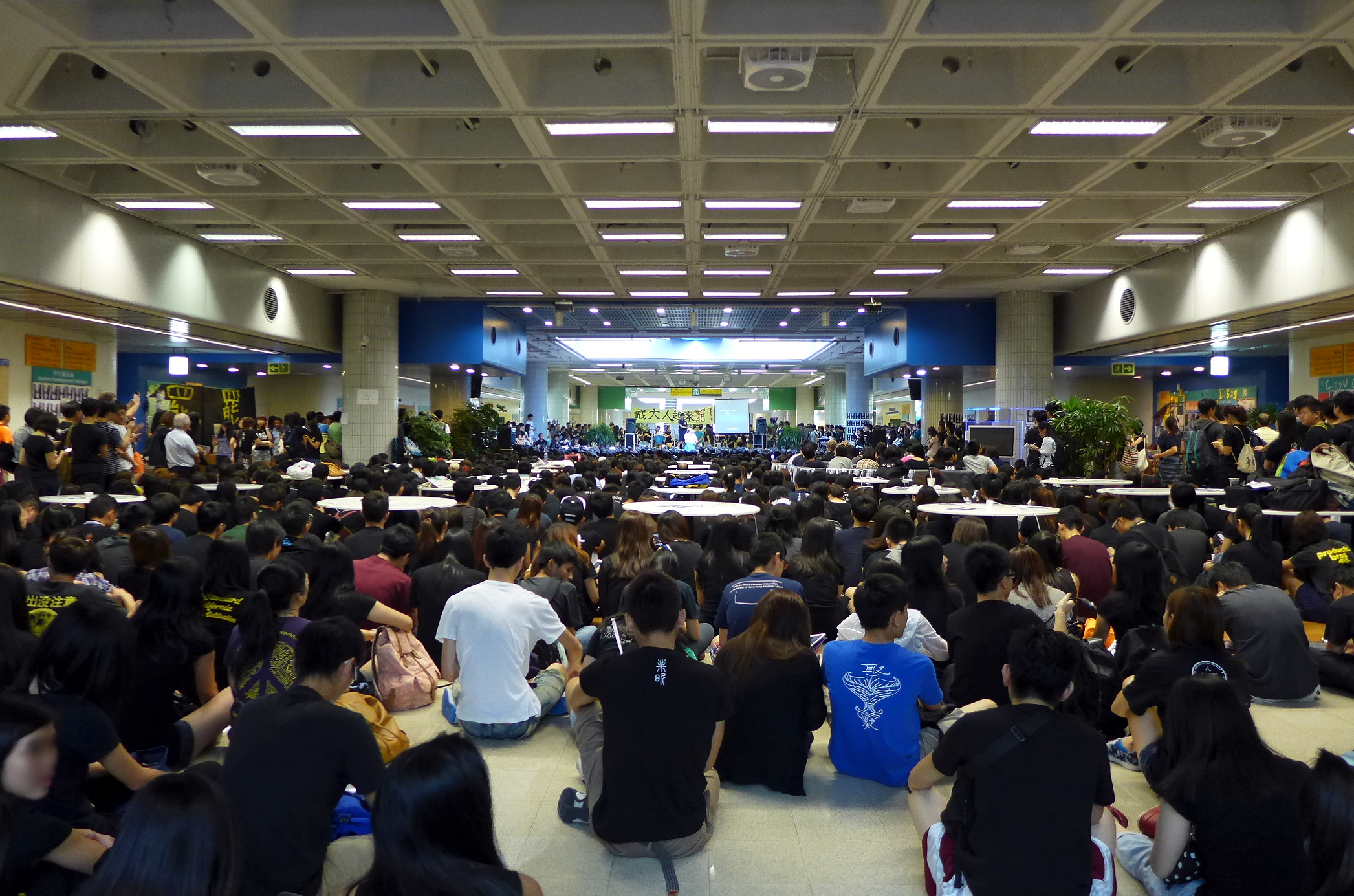
City University of Hong Kong students staging a sit-in during 2014 Hong Kong protests over blocking of electoral reforms

Students demonstrating against university privatization in Athens, Greece, 2007

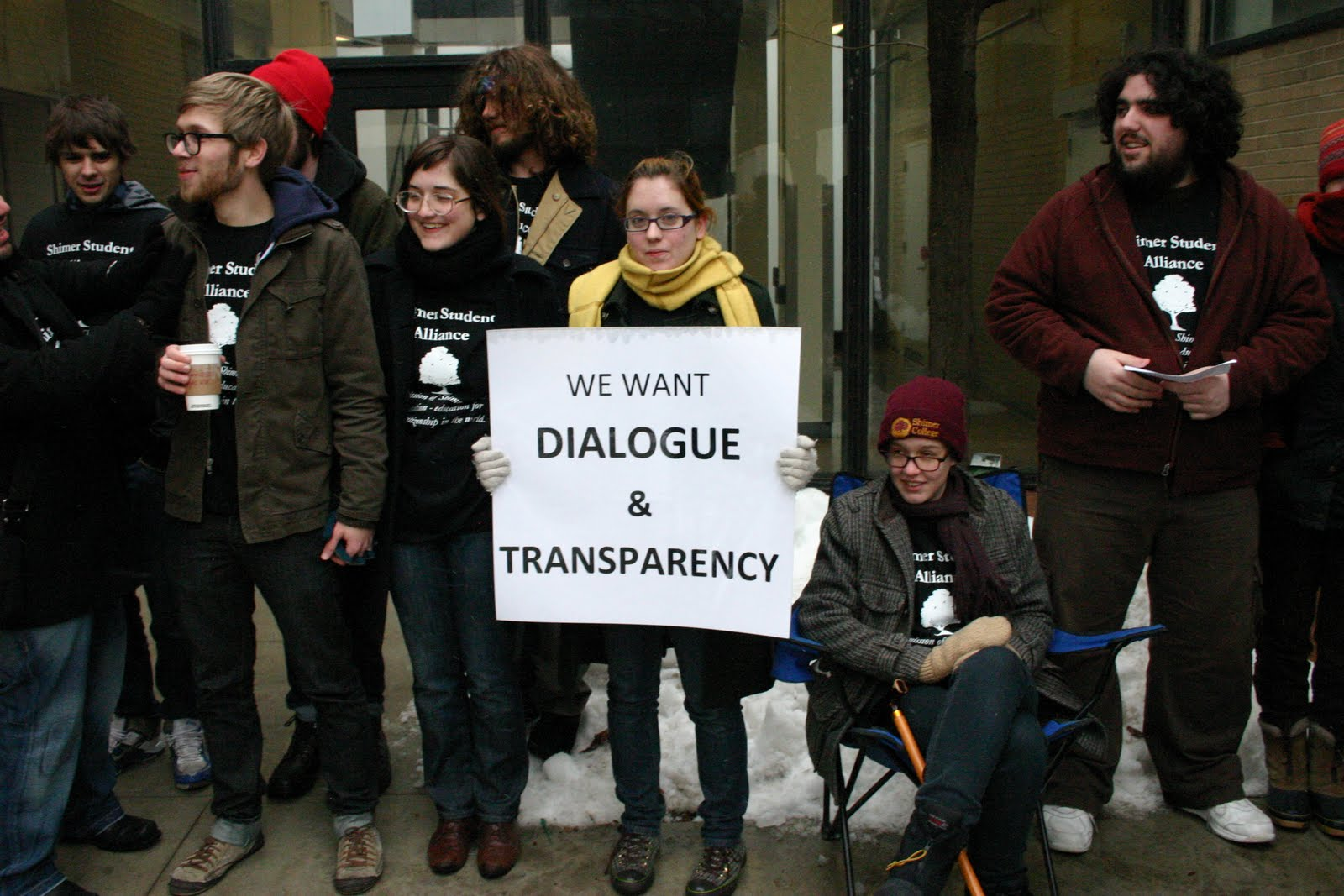
Shimer College students protesting threatened changes to the school's democratic governance, 2010

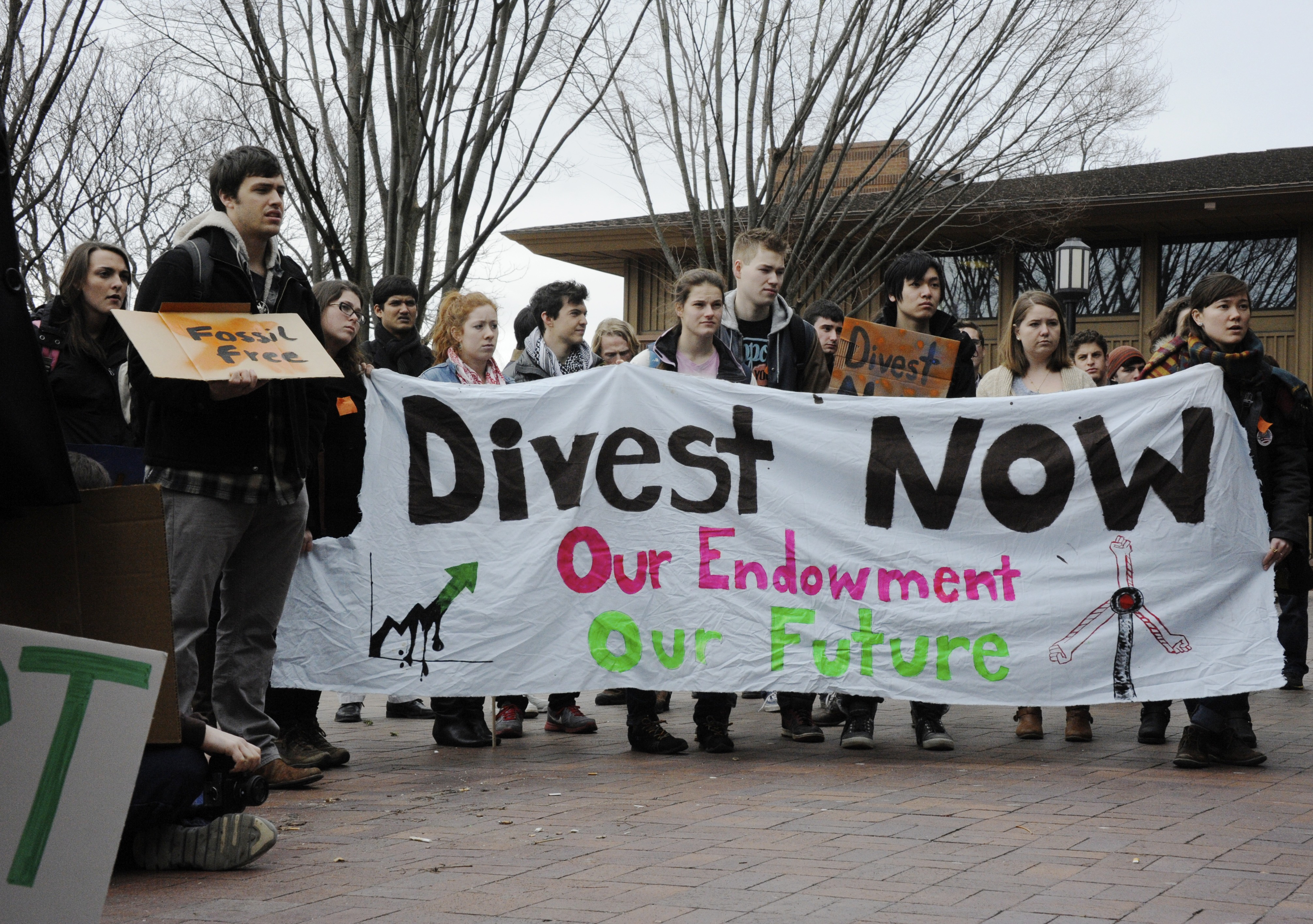
Tufts University students demonstrating for disinvestment from fossil fuels, 2013

Student activism or campus activism is work by students to cause political, environmental, economic, or social change. In addition to education, student groups often play central roles in democratization and winning civil rights.

Modern student activist movements span all ages, races, socio-economic backgrounds, and political perspectives. Some student protests focus on the internal affairs of an institution (like disinvestment); others tackle wars or dictatorships. Student activism is most often associated with left-wing politics.

== Early examples ==
Student activism at the university level is nearly as old as the university itself.

Students in Paris and Bologna staged collective actions as early as the 13th century, chiefly over town and gown issues.

Student protests over broader political issues also have a long pedigree. In Joseon Dynasty Korea, 150 Sungkyunkwan students staged an unprecedented demonstration against the king in 1519 over the Kimyo purge.

== By country ==
=== Argentina ===
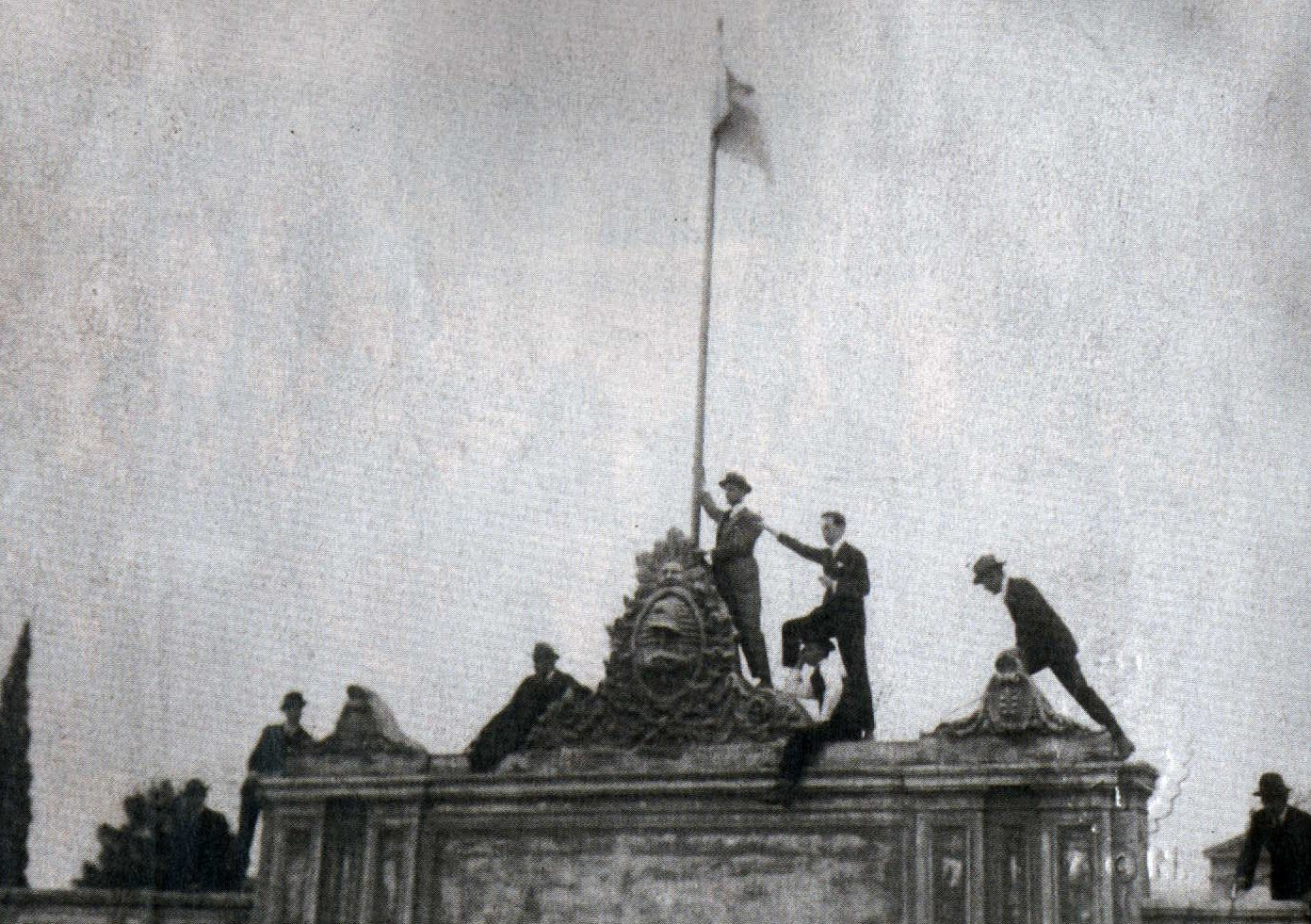
Students raise the flag of Argentina at the University of Córdoba, 1918.

In Argentina, as elsewhere in Latin America, the tradition of student activism dates back to at least the 19th century, but it was not until after 1900 that it became a major political force. In 1918 student activism triggered a general modernization of the universities especially tending towards democratization, called the University Revolution (Spanish: revolución universitaria). The events started in Córdoba and were accompanied by similar uprisings across Latin America. The Córdoba Manifesto encapsulates the interests of students' during this time in making their education institutions more democratic.

=== Australia ===
Australian students have a long history of being active in political debates. This is particularly true in the newer universities that have been established in suburban areas.

For much of the 20th century, the major campus organizing group across Australia was the Australian Union of Students, which was founded in 1937 as the Union of Australian University Students. The AUS folded in 1984. It was replaced by the National Union of Students in 1987.

=== Bangladesh ===
Student politics of Bangladesh is reactive, confrontational and violent. Student organizations act as the armament of the political parties they are part of. Over the years, political clashes and factional feuds in the educational institutes killed many, seriously hampering the academic atmosphere. To check those hitches, universities have no options but go to lengthy and unexpected closures. Therefore, classes are not completed on time and there are session jams.

The student wings of ruling parties dominate the campuses and residential halls through crime and violence to enjoy various unauthorized facilities. They control the residential halls to manage seats in favor of their party members and loyal pupils. They eat and buy for free from the restaurants and shops nearby. They extort and grab tenders to earn illicit money. They take money from the freshmen candidates and put pressure on teachers to get an acceptance for them. They take money from the job seekers and put pressures on university administrations to appoint them.

=== Brazil ===
On August 11, 1937, the União Nacional dos Estudantes (UNE) was formed as a platform for students to create change in Brazil. The organization tried to unite students from all over Brazil. However, in the 1940s the group had aligned more with socialism. Then in the 1950s the group changed alignment again, this time aligning with more conservative values. The União Metropolitana dos Estudantes rose up in replacement of the once socialist UNE. However, it was not long until União Nacional dos Estudantes once again sided with socialism, thus joining forces with the União Metropolitana dos Estudantes.

The União Nacional dos Estudantes was influential in the democratization of higher education. Their first significant feat occurred during World War II when they successfully pressured Brazilian president Getúlio Vargas to join the side of the Allies.

In 1964, UNE was outlawed after elected leader João Goulart was disposed of power by a military coup. The military regime terrorized students in an effort to make them subservient. In 1966, students began protesting anyway despite the reality of further terror.

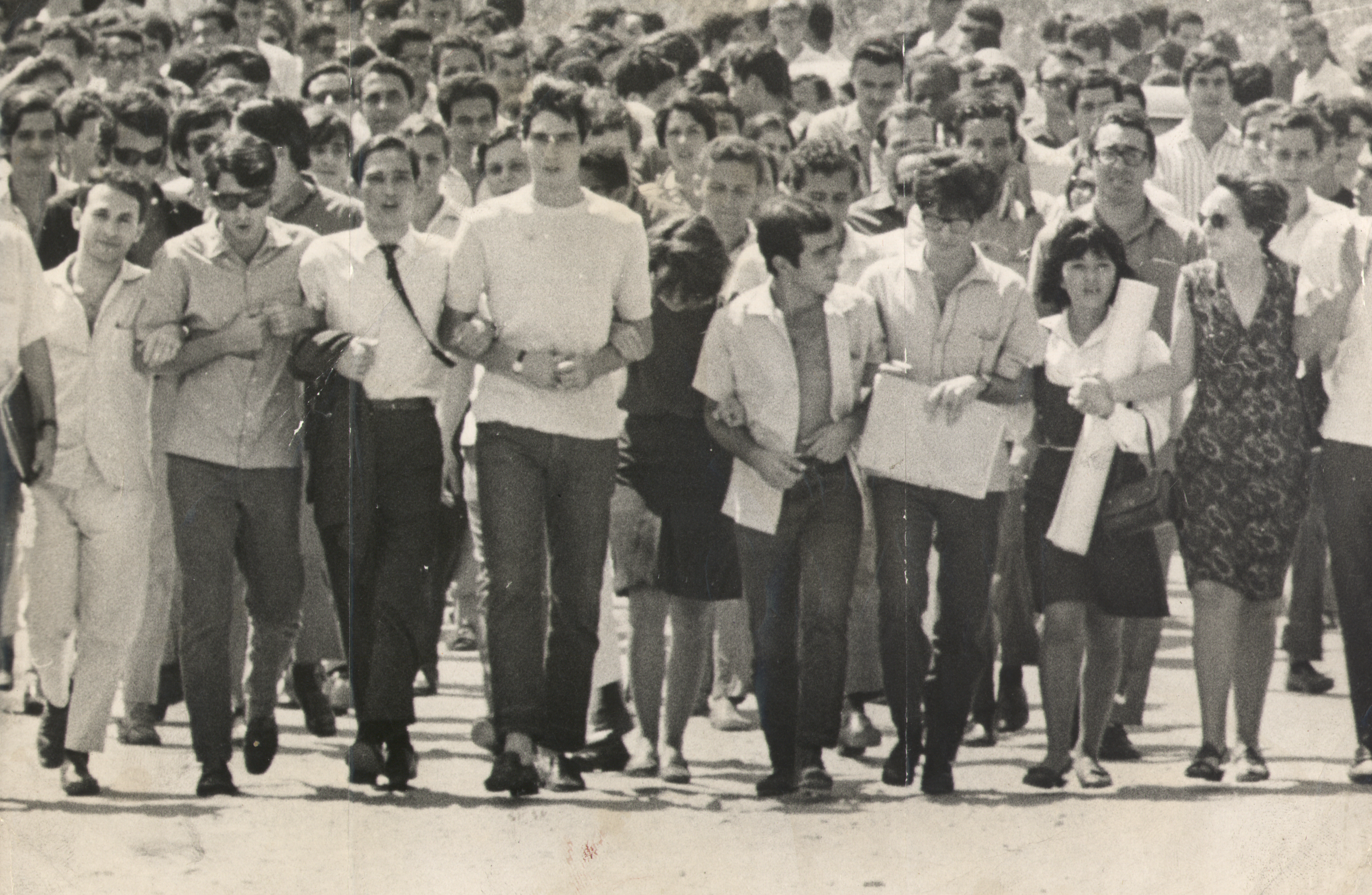
Brazilian students march against the military dictatorship in Brazil, 1966

All the protests led up to the March of the One Hundred Thousand in June 1968. Organized by the UNE, this protest was the largest yet. A few months later the government passed Institutional Act Number Five which officially banned students from any further protest.

=== Canada ===
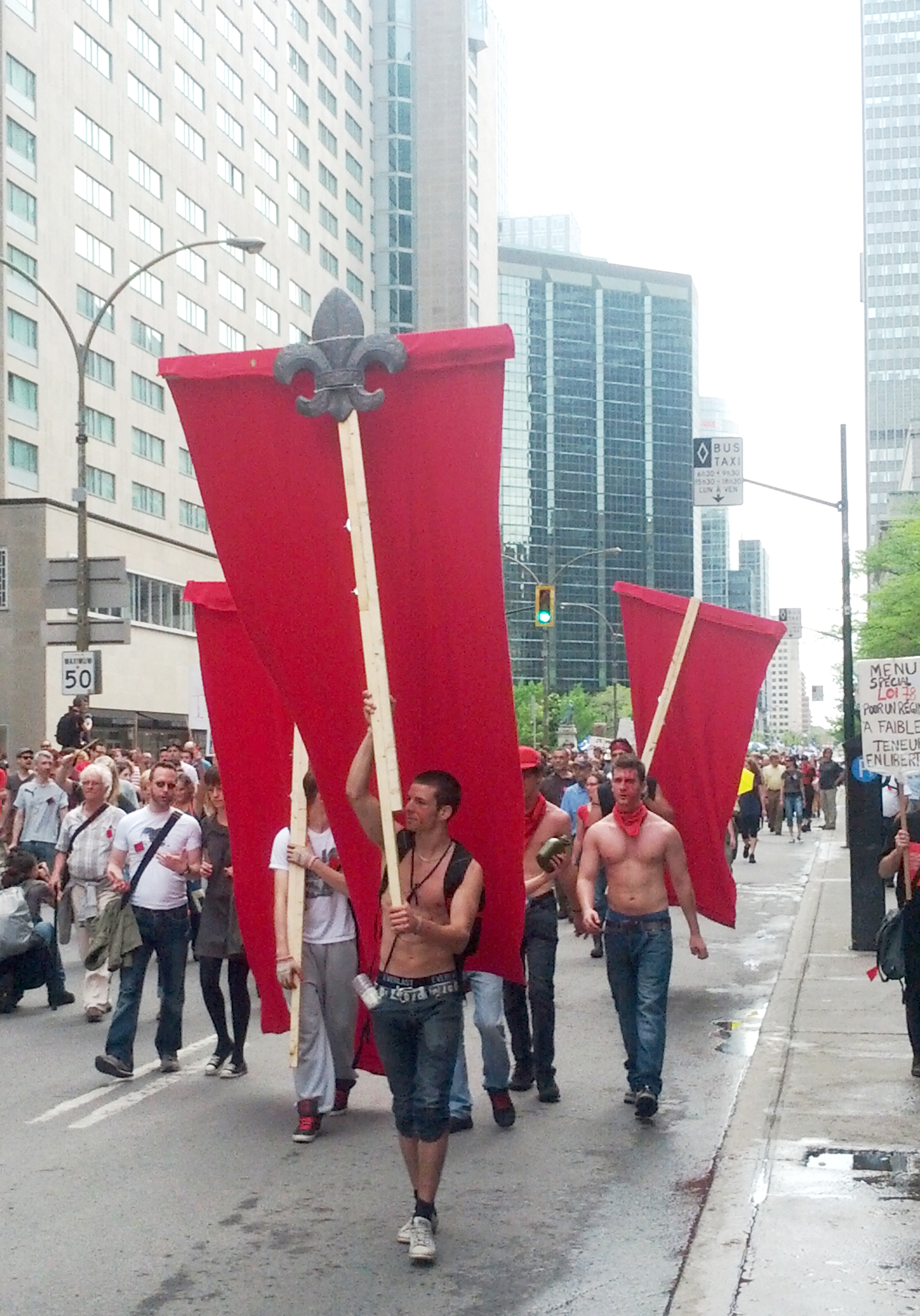
Students protest against Bill 78 in Montreal, 2012.

In Canada, New Left student organizations from the late 1950s and 1960s became mainly two: SUPA (Student Union for Peace Action) and CYC (Company of Young Canadians). SUPA grew out of the CUCND (Combined Universities Campaign for Nuclear Disarmament) in December 1964, at a University of Saskatchewan conference. While CUCND had focused on protest marches, SUPA sought to change Canadian society as a whole. The scope expanded to grass-roots politics in disadvantaged communities and 'consciousness raising' to radicalize and raise awareness of the 'generation gap' experienced by Canadian youth. SUPA was a decentralized organization, rooted in local university campuses. SUPA however disintegrated in late 1967 over debates concerning the role of working class and 'Old Left'. Members moved to the CYC or became active leaders in CUS (Canadian Union of Students), leading the CUS to assume the mantle of New Left student agitation.

In 1968, SDU (Students for a Democratic University) was formed at McGill and Simon Fraser Universities. SFU SDU, originally former SUPA members and New Democratic Youth, absorbed members from the campus Liberal Club and Young Socialists. SDU was prominent in an Administration occupation in 1968, and a student strike in 1969. After the failure of the student strike, SDU broke up. Some members joined the IWW and Yippies (Youth International Party). Other members helped form the Vancouver Liberation Front in 1970. The FLQ (Quebec Liberation Front) was considered a terrorist organization, causing the use of the War Measures Act after 95 bombings in the October Crisis. This was the only peacetime use of the War Measures Act.

Since the 1970s, PIRGs (Public Interest Research Groups) have been created as a result of Student Union referendums across Canada in individual provinces. Like their American counterparts, Canadian PIRGs are student directed, run, and funded. Most operate on a consensus decision making model. Despite efforts at collaboration, Canadian PIRGs are independent of each other.

Anti-Bullying Day (a.k.a. Pink Shirt Day) was created by high school students David Shepherd, and Travis Price of Berwick, Nova Scotia, and is now celebrated annually across Canada.

In 2012, the Quebec Student Movement arose due to an increase of tuition of 75%; that took students out of class and into the streets because that increase did not allow students to comfortably extend their education, because of fear of debt or not having money at all. Following elections that year, premier Jean Charest promised to repeal anti-assembly laws and cancel the tuition hike.

Canadian universities have been active sites for debate and mobilization, with student groups advocating on both sides of the conflict. This activism has led to significant polarization on campuses, with heated debates, protests, and resolutions at institutions like McGill University and York University. The discussions often involve broader issues of academic freedom and concerns over rising antisemitism and Islamophobia. As the Israeli-Palestinian conflict remains unresolved, it continues to be a key issue driving student activism in Canada.

=== Chile ===
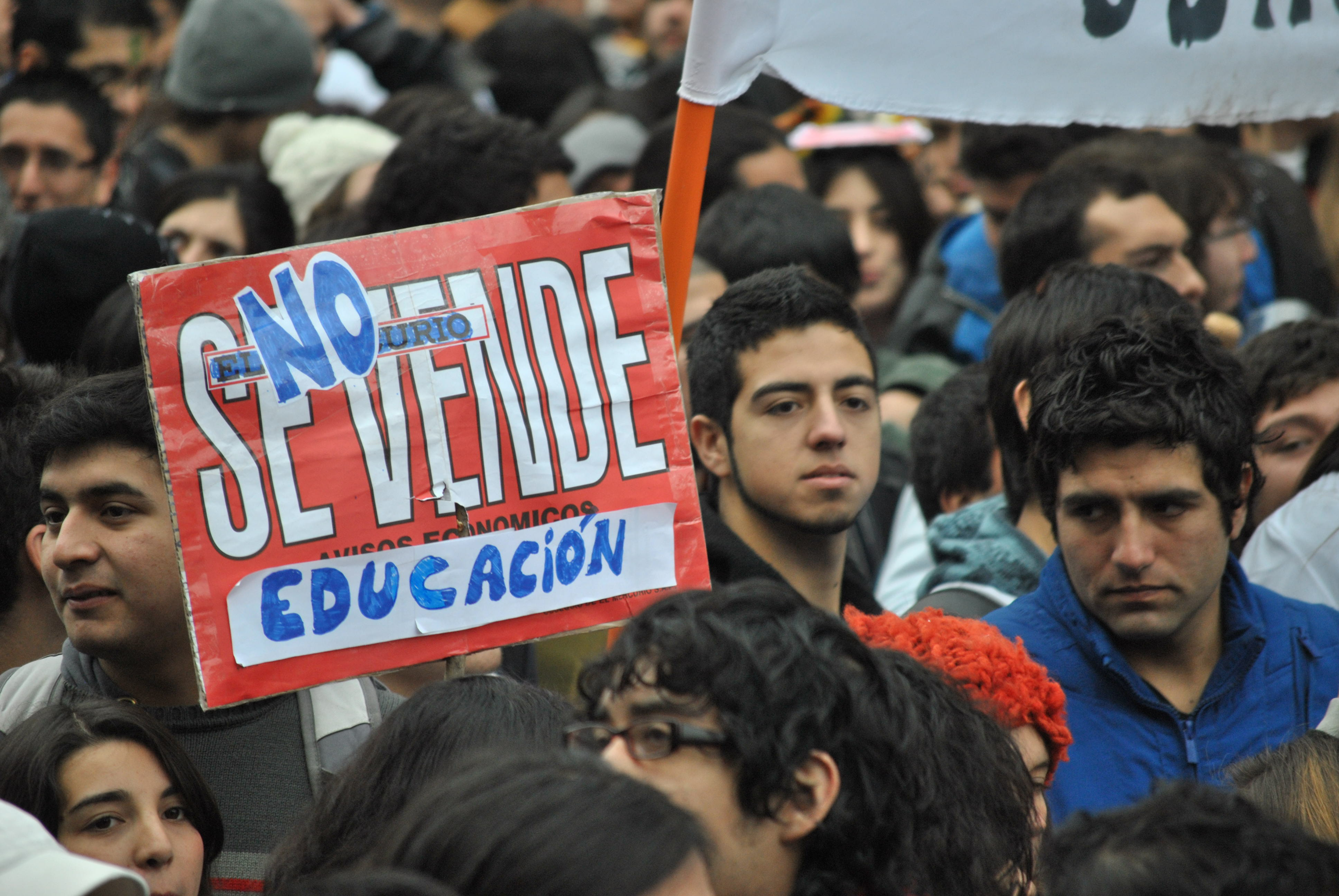
Chilean students demonstrate for greater public involvement in education.

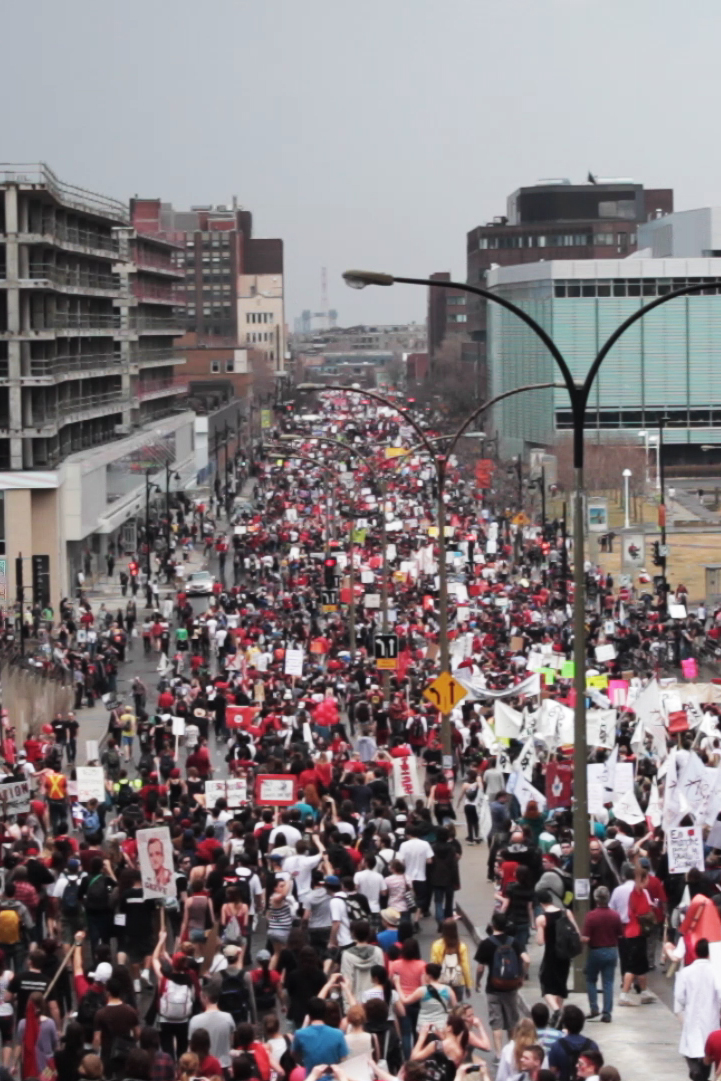
Large demonstration on March 22 against the increase in tuition fees during the 2012 Quebec Student Strike.

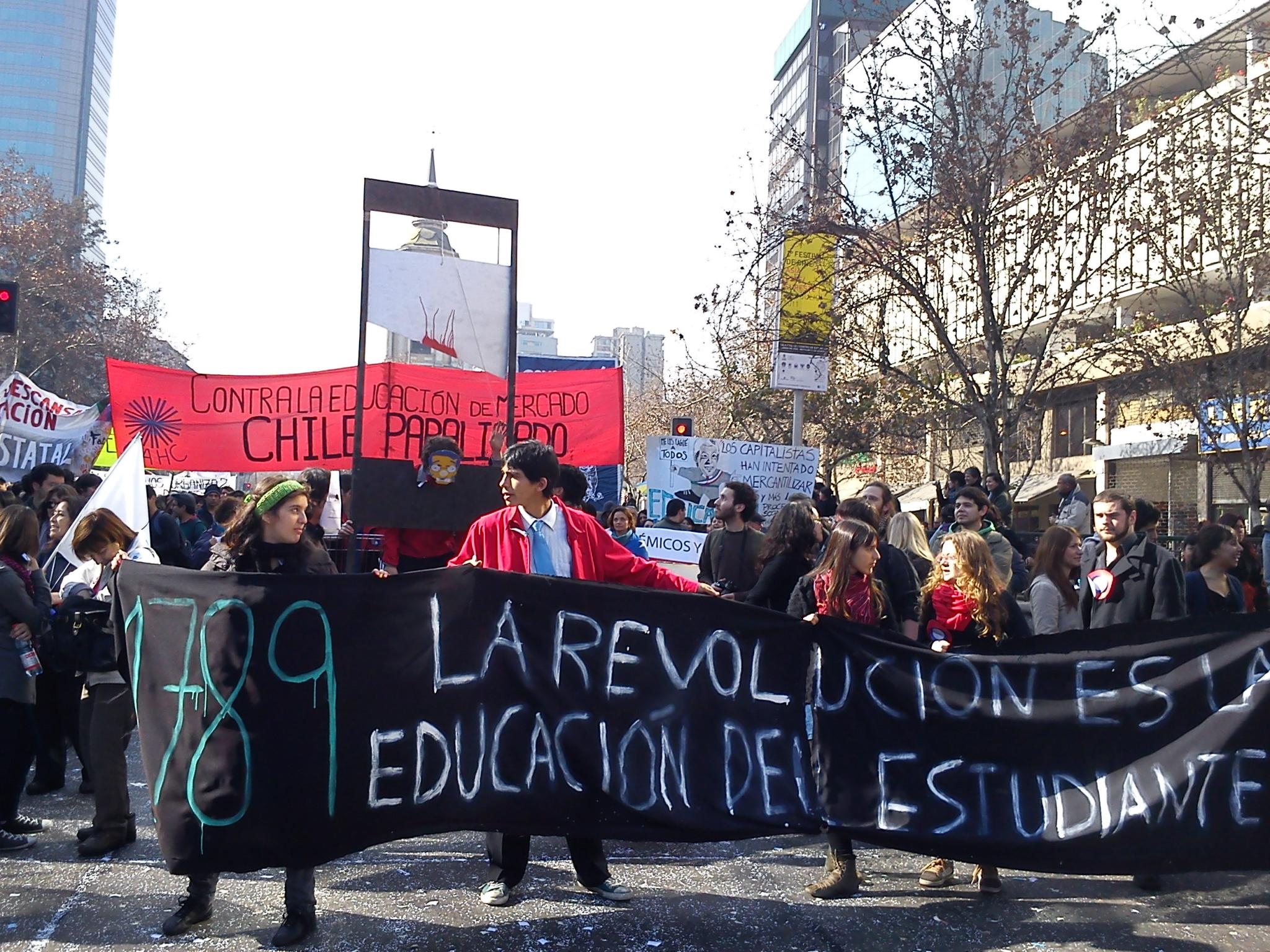
Student march in Santiago, Chile, during the 2011 student mobilization in Chile.

From 2011 to 2013, Chile was rocked by a series of student-led nationwide protests across Chile, demanding a new framework for education in the country, including more direct state participation in secondary education and an end to the existence of profit in higher education. Currently in Chile, only 45% of high school students study in traditional public schools and most universities are also private. No new public universities have been built since the end of the Chilean transition to democracy in 1990, even though the number of university students has swelled. Beyond the specific demands regarding education, the protests reflected a "deep discontent" among some parts of society with Chile's high level of inequality. Protests have included massive non-violent marches, but also a considerable amount of violence on the part of a side of protestors as well as riot police.

The first clear government response to the protests was a proposal for a new education fund and a cabinet shuffle which replaced Minister of Education Joaquín Lavín and was seen as not fundamentally addressing student movement concerns. Other government proposals were also rejected.

=== China ===
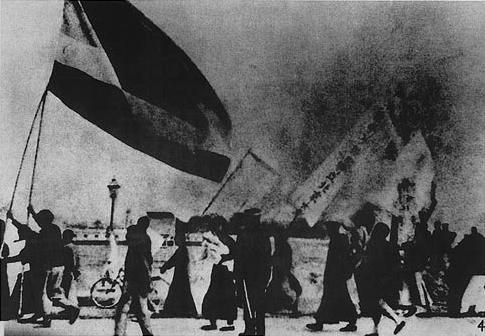
Students from the Peking University protesting on Tiananmen Square in 1919

Since the defeat of the Qing Dynasty during the First (1839–1842) and Second Opium Wars (1856–1860), student activism has played a significant role in the modern Chinese history.

Fueled mostly by Chinese nationalism, Chinese student activism strongly believes that young people are responsible for China's future. This strong nationalistic belief has been able to manifest in several forms such as pro-democracy, anti-Americanism and pro-communism.

In 1919, the May Fourth Movement saw over 3,000 students of Peking University and other schools gather together in front of Tiananmen and demonstrate. It is regarded as an essential step of the democratic revolution in China, and it had also given birth to Chinese Communism.

During the 1927–1937 Nanjing decade, student activism played an outsized role.

While nationalist Anti-American movements led by some students and intellectuals during the Chinese Civil War were instrumental in winning enough support for the CCP in urban areas to prevail, there remained lots of polarization on campuses in the late 1940s with a wide range of views. Ironically, America's influence in post-war China, designed to prevent Soviet influence appears to have backfired for the United States as some Chinese students were sensitive to any overt foreign influence after the Japanese occupation.

In 1989, the Tiananmen Square protests, led by students, inspired ended in a brutal government massacre of thousands, damaging the reputation of the Chinese Communist Party as it moved towards a more repressive approach to speech and dissent.

In the decades following 1989, Chinese university students continued to participate in public demonstrations and issue-based campaigns. In May 1999, students played a leading role in the anti-US and anti-NATO demonstrations that followed the bombing of the Chinese embassy in Belgrade. In 2005, university students also participated in nationwide anti-Japanese demonstrations concerning Japanese history textbooks and Japan's campaign for a permanent seat on the United Nations Security Council.

Student activism during the late 2010s and early 2020s also addressed gender equality, labor rights, and government policy. In 2018, students and alumni from more than 40 Chinese universities issued open letters calling on their institutions to establish mechanisms for preventing sexual harassment, as part of the Chinese campus #MeToo movement. Later that year, university students and recent graduates formed the Jasic Workers Solidarity Group to support workers seeking to establish a union at Jasic Technology. In November 2022, university students were among the principal participants in the White Paper protests against China's strict zero-COVID restrictions.

In addition to large collective mobilizations, media reports documented issue-specific public actions by individual university students. In 2013, Lei Chuang, then a graduate student at Shanghai Jiao Tong University, wrote to 568 deputies of the National People's Congress, calling for stronger measures against discrimination toward people with hepatitis B. In 2019, Wang Jieying, then a student at the East China University of Political Science and Law, joined fellow law students in suing Shanghai Disneyland, challenging its restrictions on visitors bringing outside food. In 2025, Kong Junyou, then a student at Shanghai University, conducted a filmed five-day performance-art protest against intrusive elevator advertising, shutting down more than 100 advertising screens in residential buildings.

=== Czech Republic ===
Jan Palach and Jan Zajíc's protests against the end of the Prague Spring used self-immolation.

=== Democratic Republic of the Congo ===
Student activism played an important, yet understudied, role in Congo's crisis of decolonization. Throughout the 1960s, students denounced the unfinished decolonization of higher education and the unrealized promises of national independence. The two issues crossed in the demonstration of June 4, 1969. Student activism continues and women such as Aline Mukovi Neema, winner of 100 Women BBC award, continue to campaign for political change in the Democratic Republic of the Congo.

=== Eastern Europe and the post-Soviet Union states ===
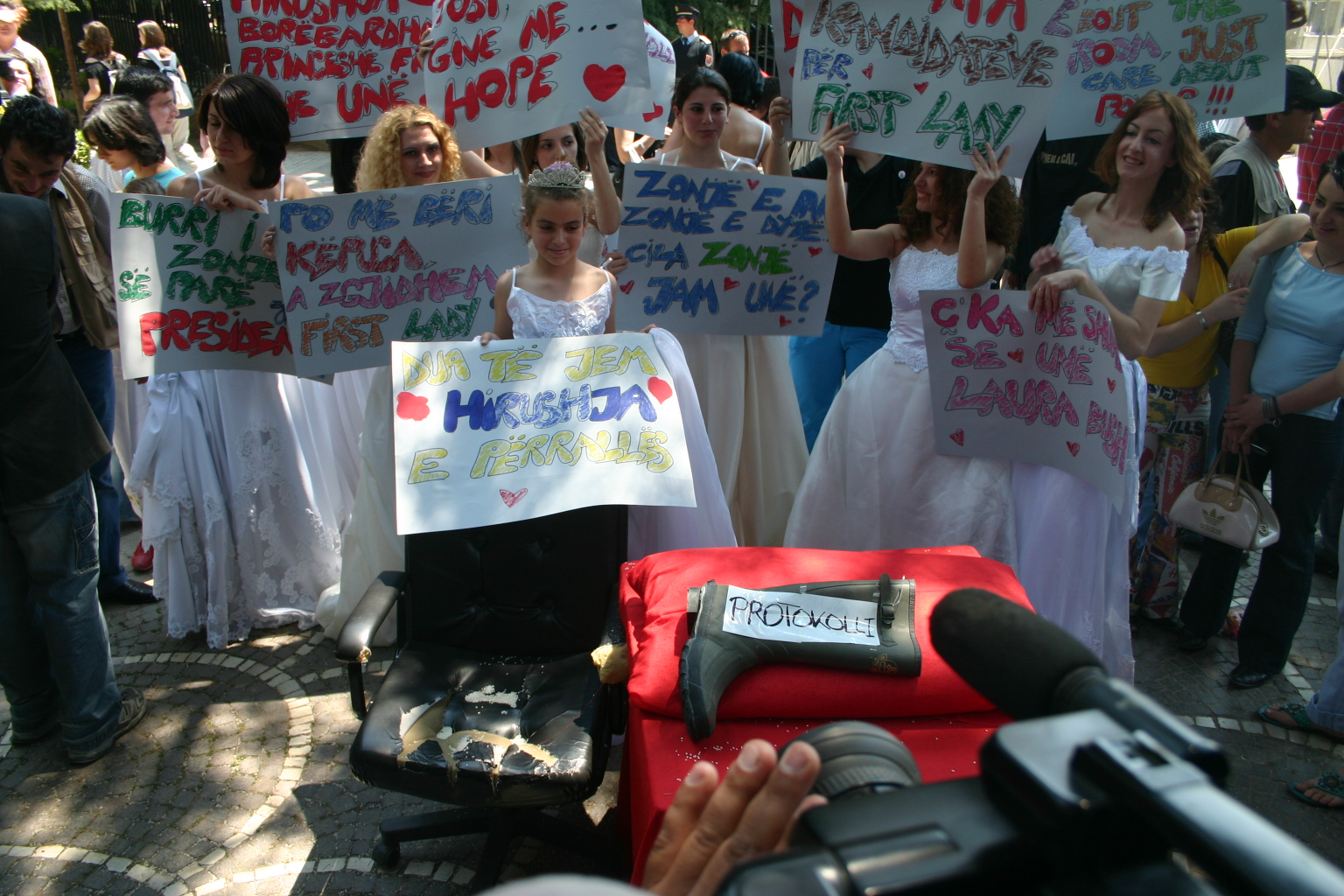
MJAFT! protest in Albania

During communist rule, students in Eastern Europe were the force behind several of the best-known instances of protest. The chain of events leading to the 1956 Hungarian Revolution was started by peaceful student demonstrations in the streets of Budapest, later attracting workers and other Hungarians. In Czechoslovakia, one of the most known faces of the protests following the Soviet-led invasion that ended the Prague Spring was Jan Palach, a student who committed suicide by setting fire to himself on January 16, 1969. The act triggered a major protest against the occupation.

Student-dominated youth movements have also played a central role in the "color revolutions" seen in post-communist societies in recent years.

Of the color revolutions, the Velvet Revolution of 1989 in the Czechoslovak capital of Prague was one of them. Though the Velvet Revolution began as a celebration of International Students' Day, the single event quickly turned into a nationwide ordeal aimed at the dissolution of communism. The demonstration had turned violent when police intervened. However, the police attacks garnered nationwide sympathy for the student protesters. Soon enough multiple other protests unraveled in an effort to breakdown the one party communist regime of Czechoslovakia. The series of protests were successful; they broke down the communist regime and implemented the use of democratic elections in 1990, only a few months after the first protest.

Another example of this was the Serbian Otpor! ("Resistance!" in Serbian), formed in October 1998 as a response to repressive university and media laws that were introduced that year. In the presidential campaign in September 2000, the organisation engineered the "Gotov je" ("He's finished") campaign that galvanized Serbian discontent with Slobodan Milošević, ultimately resulting in his defeat.

Otpor has inspired other youth movements in Eastern Europe, such as Kmara in Georgia, which played an important role in the Rose Revolution, and PORA in Ukraine, which was key in organising the demonstrations that led to the Orange Revolution. Like Otpor, these organisations have consequently practiced non-violent resistance and used ridiculing humor in opposing authoritarian leaders. Similar movements include KelKel in Kyrgyzstan, Zubr in Belarus and MJAFT! in Albania.

=== Ethiopia ===
Student movements in Ethiopia in the late 1960s, during the reign of Emperor Haile Selassie, included debates about the social sciences and social change and played a significant role in political opposition to Haile Selassie, which led to the 1974 Ethiopian Revolution. Student activism played a role in both socially progressive aspects of the revolution and in human rights violations. Student activism and their use of the social sciences played a role in the 1991 fall of the following government, the Derg, and in the implementation of the rule of Ethiopian People's Revolutionary Democratic Front during the following three decades.

=== France ===
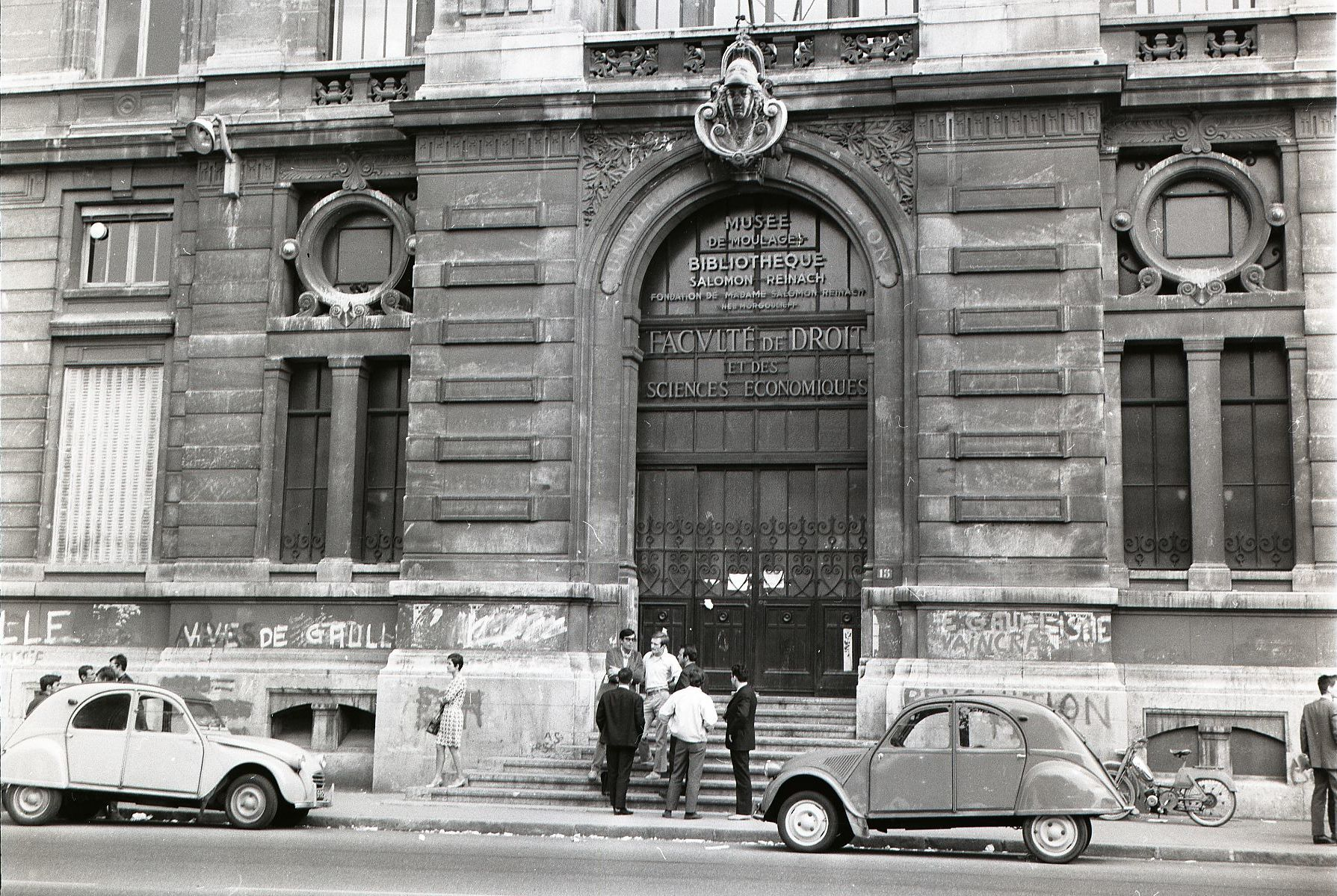
Occupation of the University of Lyon Law School, 1968

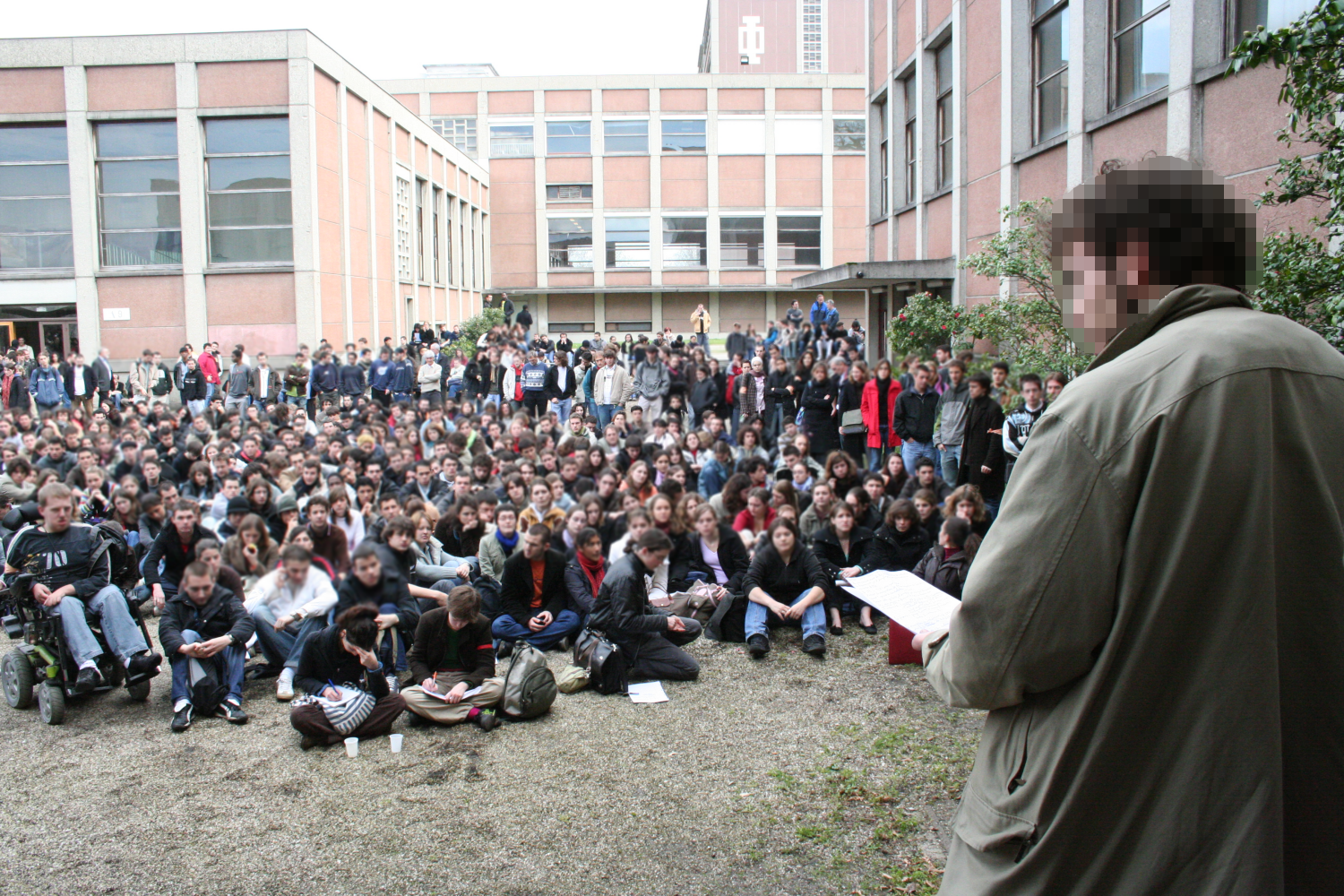
Students demonstrating against the CPE in 2006

In France, student activists have been influential in shaping public debate. In May 1968 the University of Paris at Nanterre was closed due to problems between the students and the administration. In protest of the closure and the expulsion of Nanterre students, students of the Sorbonne in Paris began their own demonstration. The situation escalated into a nationwide insurrection.

The events in Paris were followed by student protests throughout the world. The German student movement participated in major demonstrations against proposed emergency legislation. In many countries, the student protests caused authorities to respond with violence. In Spain, student demonstrations against Franco's dictatorship led to clashes with police. A student demonstration in Mexico City ended in a storm of bullets on the night of October 2, 1968, an event known as the Tlatelolco massacre. Even in Pakistan, students took to the streets to protest changes in education policy, and on November 7 two college students died after police opened fire on a demonstration. The global reverberations from the French uprising of 1968 continued into 1969 and even into the 1970s.

=== Germany ===
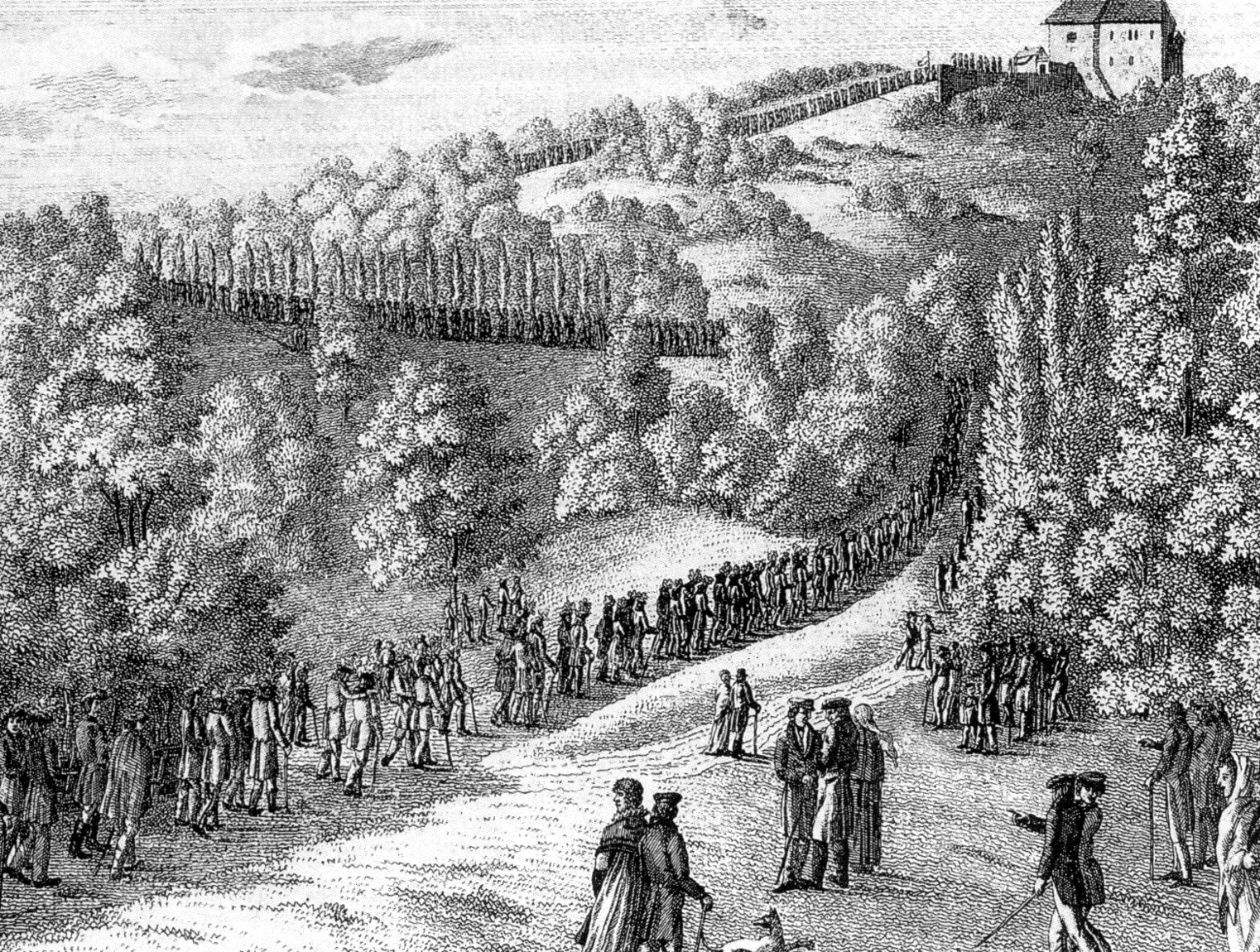
Procession of students at Wartburg Festival

In 1815 in Jena (Germany) the "Urburschenschaft" was founded. That was a Studentenverbindung that was concentrated on national and democratic ideas. In 1817, inspired by liberal and patriotic ideas of a united Germany, student organisations gathered for the Wartburg festival at Wartburg Castle, at Eisenach in Thuringia, on the 300th anniversary of Martin Luther's 95 theses.

In May 1832 the Hambacher Fest was celebrated at Hambach Castle near Neustadt an der Weinstraße with about 30,000 participants, amongst them many students. Together with the Frankfurter Wachensturm in 1833 planned to free students held in prison at Frankfurt and Georg Büchner's revolutionary pamphlet Der Hessische Landbote that were events that led to the revolutions in the German states in 1848.

The White Rose society in Nazi Germany lasted from 1942 to 1943, during which students mailed anti-Nazi leaflets around the country until the leaders were caught and executed.

In the 1960s, the worldwide upswing in student and youth radicalism manifested itself through the German student movement and organisations such as the German Socialist Student Union. The movement in Germany shared many concerns of similar groups elsewhere, such as the democratisation of society and opposing the Vietnam War, but also stressed more nationally specific issues such as coming to terms with the legacy of the Nazi regime and opposing the German Emergency Acts.

=== Greece ===
Student activism in Greece has a long and intense history. Student activism in the 1960s was one of the reasons cited to justify the imposition of the dictatorship in 1967. Following the imposition of the dictatorship, the Athens Polytechnic uprising in 1973 triggered a series of events that led to the abrupt end of the regime's attempted "liberalisation" process under Spiros Markezinis, and, after that, to the eventual collapse of the Greek junta during Metapolitefsi and the return of democracy in Greece. Kostas Georgakis was a Greek student of geology, who, in the early hours of 19 September 1970, set himself ablaze in Matteotti square in Genoa as a protest against the dictatorial regime of Georgios Papadopoulos. His suicide greatly embarrassed the junta, and caused a sensation in Greece and abroad as it was the first tangible manifestation of the depth of resistance against the junta. The junta delayed the arrival of his remains to Corfu for four months citing security reasons and fearing demonstrations while presenting bureaucratic obstacles through the Greek consulate and the junta government.

=== Hong Kong (SAR of China) ===
Hong Kong Student activist group Scholarism began an occupation of the Hong Kong government headquarters on 30 August 2012. The goal of the protest was, expressly, to force the government to retract its plans to introduce Moral and National Education as a compulsory subject. On 1 September, an open concert was held as part of the protest, with an attendance of 40,000. At last, the government de facto struck down the Moral and National Education.

Student organizations made important roles during the Umbrella Movement. Standing Committee of the National People's Congress (NPCSC) made decisions on the Hong Kong political reform on 31 August 2014, which the Nominating Committee would tightly control the nomination of the Chief Executive candidate, candidates outside the Pro-Beijing camp would not have opportunities to be nominated. The Hong Kong Federation of Students and Scholarism led a strike against the NPCSC's decision beginning on 22 September 2014, and started protesting outside the government headquarters on 26 September 2014. On 28 September, the Occupy Central with Love and Peace movement announced that the beginning of their civil disobedience campaign. Students and other members of the public demonstrated outside government headquarters, and some began to occupy several major city intersections.

=== India ===
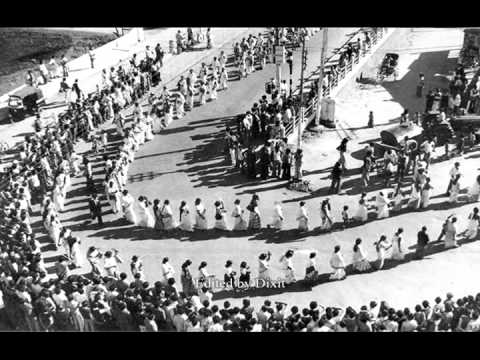
Students Participating in a rally during the Assam Movement

The Assam Movement (or Assam Agitation) (1979–1985) was a popular movement against illegal immigrants in Assam. The movement, led by All Assam Students Union (AASU) and the 'All Assam Gana Sangram Parishad' (AAGSP), developed a program of protests and demonstration to compel the Indian government to identify and expel illegal, (mostly Bangladeshi), immigrants and protect and provide constitutional, legislative and administrative safeguards to the indigenous Assamese people.

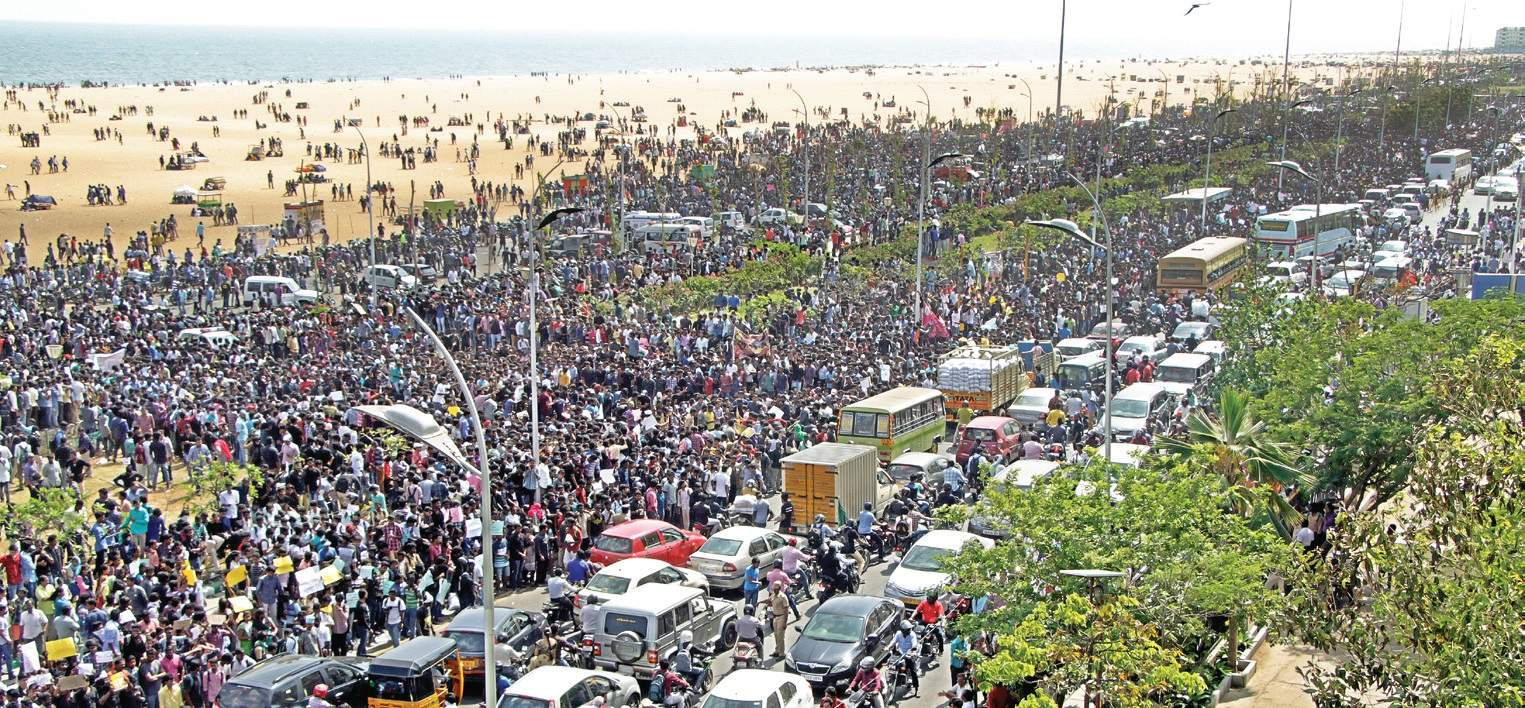
More than 2 million of students protested in Marina beach, Chennai, Tamil Nadu, India against the ban on Jallikatu.

The Jadavpur University of Kolkata have played an important role to contribute to the student activism of India. The Hokkolorob Movement (2014) stirred many around the world. It took place after the alleged police attack over unarmed students inside the campus demanding the fair justice of a student who was molested inside the campus. The Movement finally led to the expulsion of the contemporary Vice Chancellor of the university, Mr. Abhijit Chakraborty, who allegedly ordered the police to do open lathicharge over the students. Some anti-social goons were also involved in the harassment of the students.

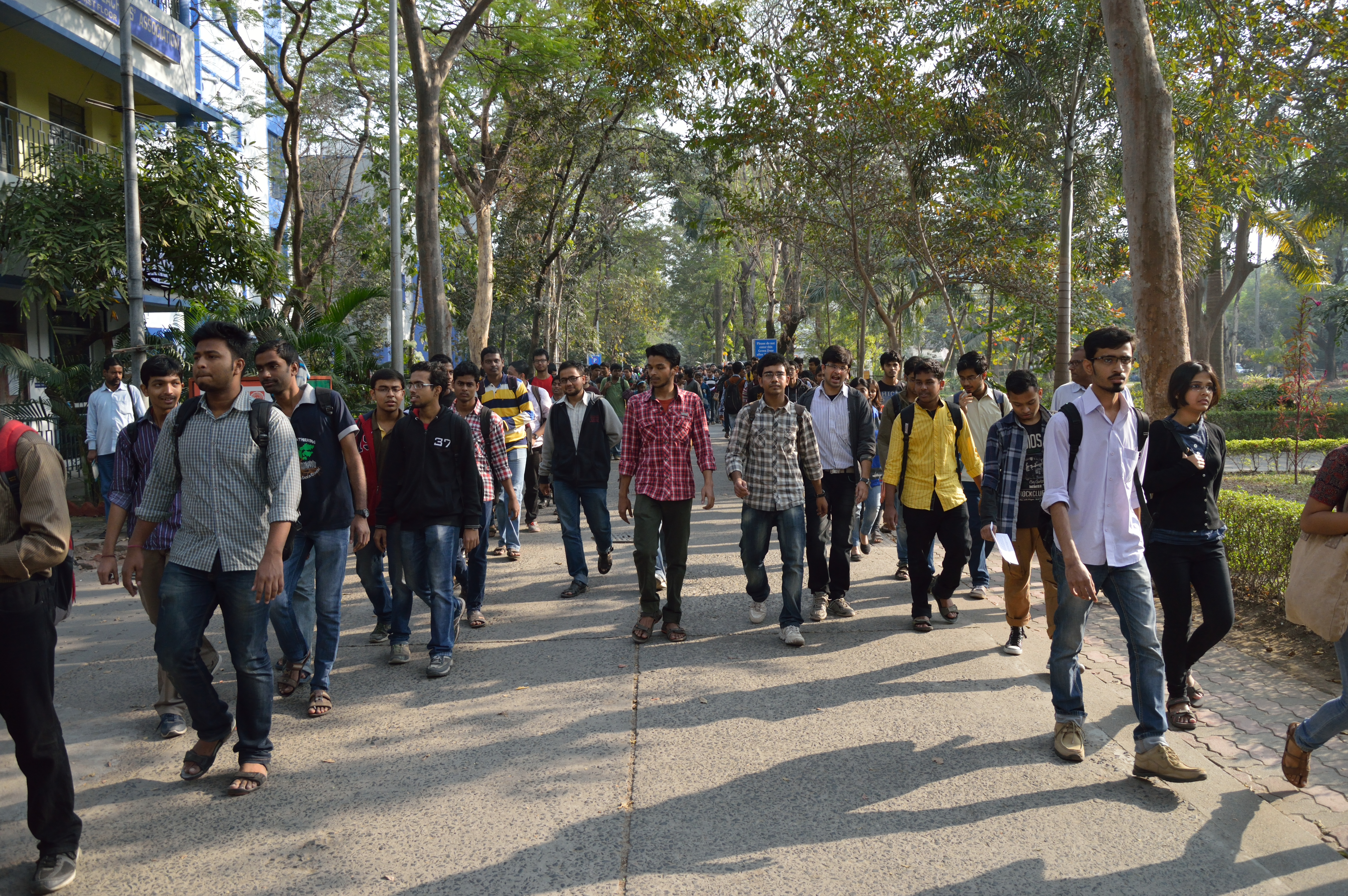
JU Students Against VC

=== Indonesia ===
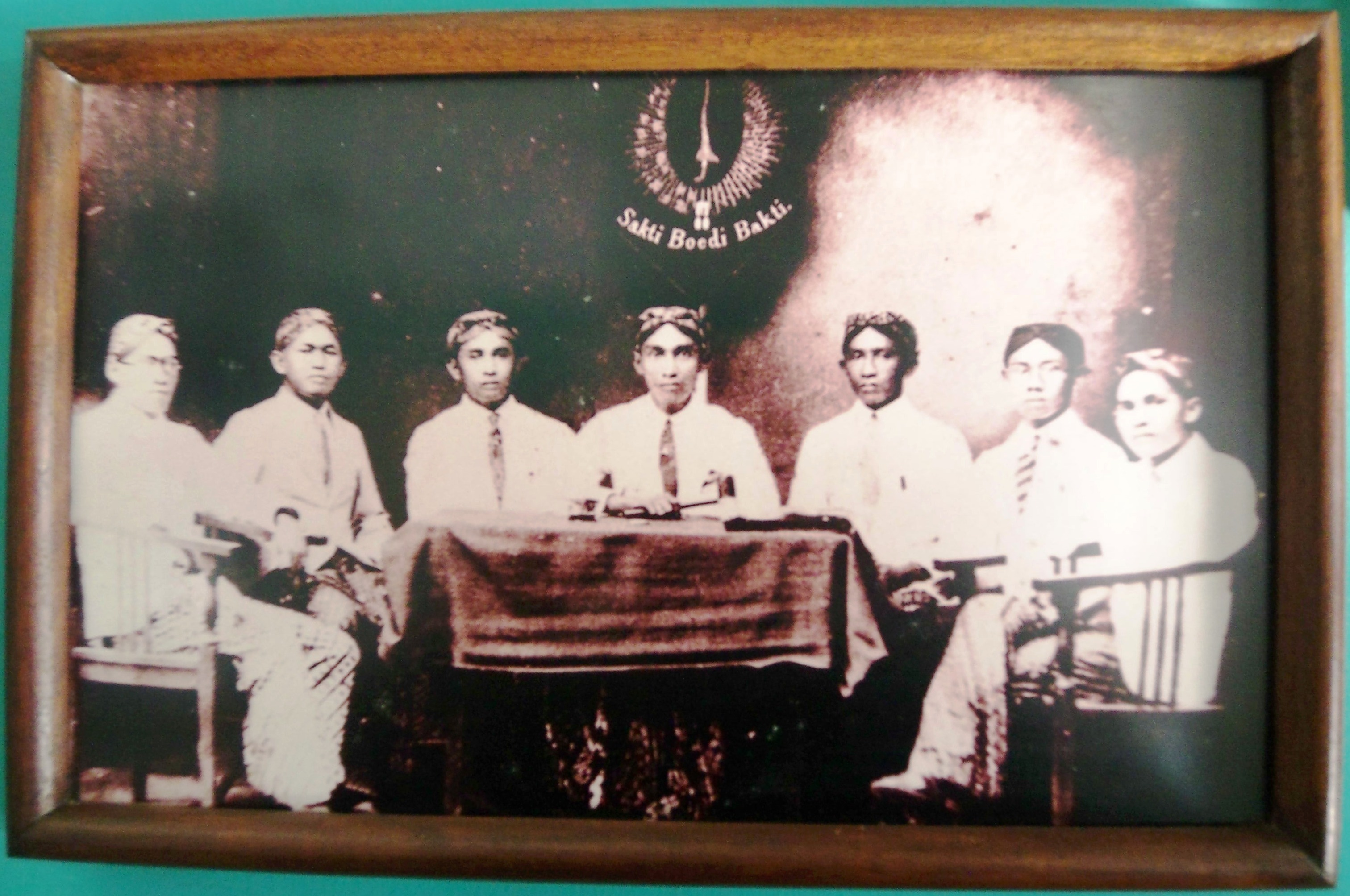
Early delegation of Java Youth

Indonesia is often believed to have hosted "some of the most important acts of student resistance in the world's history". University student groups have repeatedly been the first groups to stage street demonstrations calling for governmental change at key points in the nation's history, and other organizations from across the political spectrum have sought to align themselves with student groups. In 1928, the Youth Pledge (Sumpah Pemuda) helped to give voice to anti-colonial sentiments.

During the political turmoil of the 1960s, right-wing student groups staged demonstrations calling for then-President Sukarno to eliminate alleged Communists from his government, and later demanding that he resign. Sukarno did step down in 1967, and was replaced by Army general Suharto.

Student groups also played a key role in Suharto's 1998 fall by initiating large demonstrations that gave voice to widespread popular discontent with the president in the aftermath of the May 1998 riots. High school and university students in Jakarta, Yogyakarta, Medan, and elsewhere were some of the first groups willing to speak out publicly against the military government. Student groups were a key part of the political scene during this period. Upon taking office after Suharto stepped down, B. J. Habibie made numerous mostly unsuccessful overtures to placate the student groups that had brought down his predecessor. When that failed, he sent a combined force of police and gangsters to evict protesters occupying a government building by force. The ensuing carnage left two students dead and 181 injured.

=== Iran ===
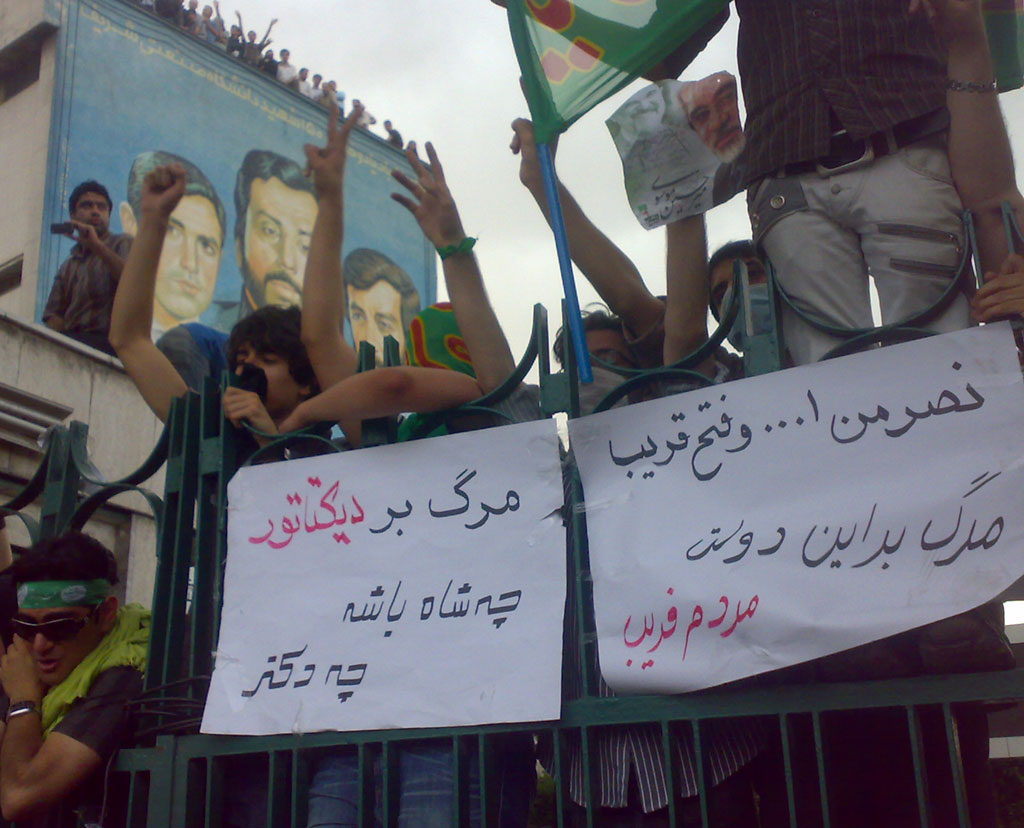
Sharif University of Technology students protest over the 2009 presidential election.

In Iran, students were at the forefront of protests both against the pre-1979 secular monarchy and, in the 2000s and 2010s, against the theocratic islamic republic. Both religious and more moderate students played a major part in Ruhollah Khomeini's opposition network against the Shah Mohammad Reza Pahlavi. In January 1978 the army dispersed demonstrating students and religious leaders, killing several students and sparking a series of widespread protests that ultimately led to the Iranian Revolution the following year. On November 4, 1979, militant Iranian students calling themselves the Muslim Students Following the Line of the Imam seized the US embassy in Tehran holding 52 embassy employees hostage for a 444 days (see Iran hostage crisis).

In the July 1999 Iranian student riots, liberal students clashed with the Iranian government. Several people were killed in a week of violent confrontations that started with a police raid on a university dormitory, a response to demonstrations by a group of students of Tehran University against the closure of a reformist newspaper. Akbar Mohammadi was given a death sentence, later reduced to 15 years in prison, for his role in the protests. In 2006, he died at Evin prison after a hunger strike protesting the refusal to allow him to seek medical treatment for injuries suffered as a result of torture.

At the end of 2002, students held mass demonstrations protesting the death sentence of reformist lecturer Hashem Aghajari for alleged blasphemy.

In June 2003, several thousand students took to the streets of Tehran in anti-government protests sparked by government plans to privatise some universities.

In the May 2005 Iranian presidential election, Iran's largest student organization, The Office to Consolidate Unity, advocated a voting boycott. After the election of President Mahmoud Ahmadinejad, student protests against the government has continued. In May 2006, up to 40 police officers were injured in clashes with demonstrating students in Tehran. At the same time, the Iranian government has called for student action in line with its own political agenda. In 2006, President Ahmadinejad urged students to organize campaigns to demand that liberal and secular university teachers be removed.

In 2009, after the disputed presidential election, a series of student protests broke out, which became known as the Iranian Green Movement. The violent measures used by the Iranian government to suppress these protests have been the subject of widespread international condemnation. As a consequence of hash repression, "the student movement entered a period of silence during Ahmadinejad's second term (2009–2013)".

During the first term of Hassan Rouhani in office (2013–2017) several groups endeavored to revive the student movement through rebuilding student organizations.

After Mahsa Amini died on September 16, 2022, massive nationwide protests erupted throughout Iran, with schoolgirls playing a historically central role. In late 2025, a new wave of protests began, following the severe economic crisis within Iran. The protests that began in Tehran soon spread out to other cities like: Kermanshah, Shiraz, and Yazd.

=== Ireland ===
On 3 May 2024 pro-Palestinian protesters set up dozens of tents in Fellows’ Square, similar to actions in the United States, Europe and India in response to Israel’s war against Hamas in Gaza. These protests were led by the student union from Trinity College Dublin. The encampment ended after five days. During the encampment, the Book of Kells exhibition was blocked. After the protest Trinity College pledged to divest from Israeli companies.

=== Israel ===
In Israel the students were amongst the leading figures in the 2011 Israeli social justice protests that grew out of the Cottage cheese boycott.

=== Japan ===
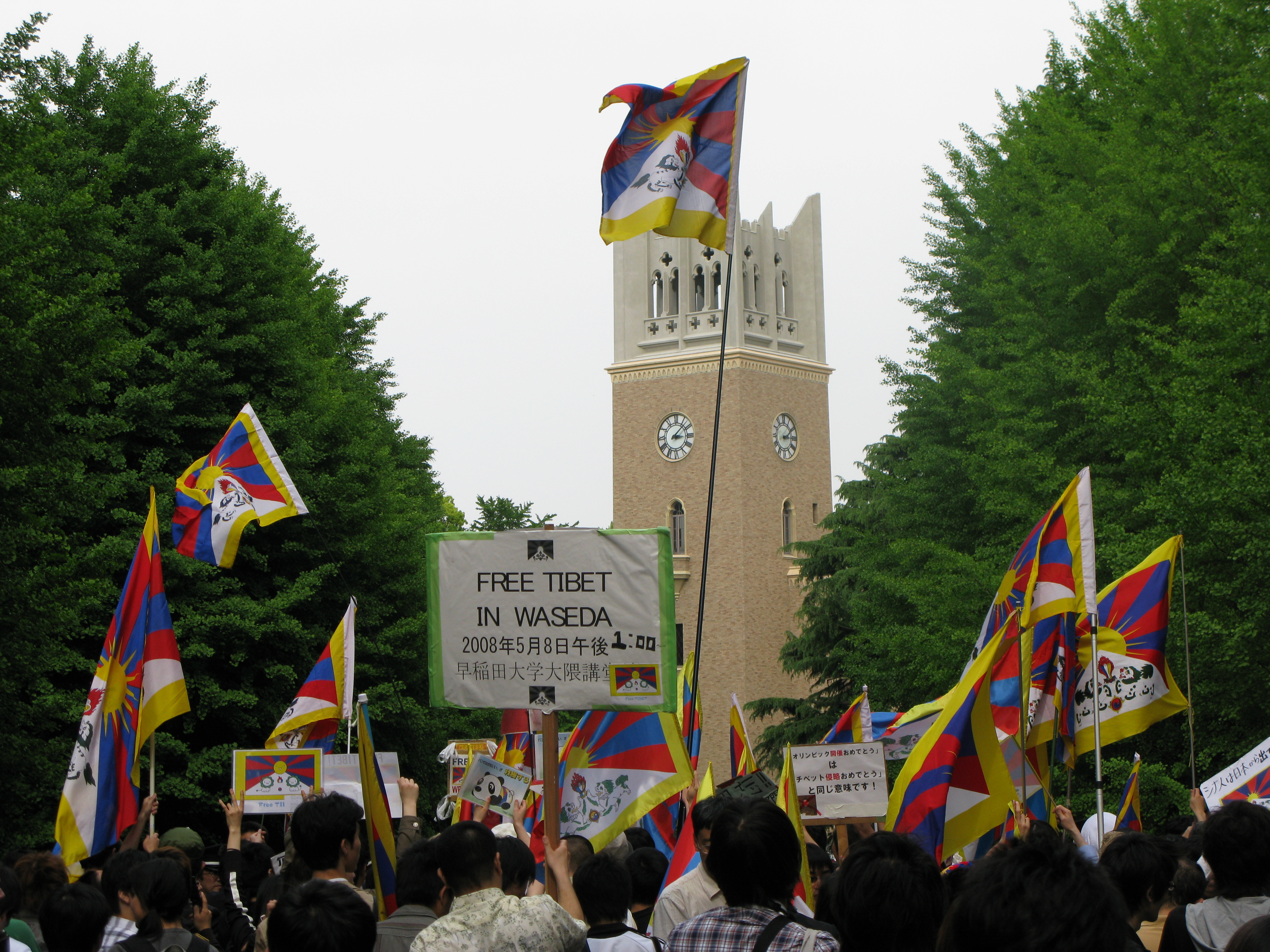
Waseda University students rally in support of Tibet, 2008.

Japanese student movement began during the Taishō Democracy, and grew in activity after World War II. One such event was the Anpo Protests, which occurred in 1960, in opposition to the Anpo treaty. In the subsequent student uprising in 1968, leftist activists barricaded themselves in universities, resulting in armed conflict with the Japanese police force. Some wider causes were supported including opposition to the Vietnam War and apartheid, and for the acceptance of the hippie lifestyle.

=== Malaysia ===
Since the amendment of Section 15 of the Universities and University Colleges Act 1971 (UUCA) in 1975, students were barred from being members of, and expressing support or opposition to, any political parties or "any organization, body or group of persons which the Minister, after consultation with the Board, has specified in writing to the Vice-Chancellor to be unsuitable to the interests and well-being of the students or the University." However, in October 2011, the Court of Appeal ruled that the relevant provision in Section 15 UUCA was unconstitutional due to Article 10 of the Federal Constitution pertaining to freedom of expression.

Since the act prohibiting students from expressing "support, sympathy or opposition" to any political party was enacted in 1971, Malaysian students have repeatedly demanded that the ban on political involvement be rescinded. The majority of students are not interested in politics because they are afraid that the universities will take action against them. The UUCA (also known by its Malaysian acronym AUKU) not however been entirely successful in eliminating student activism and political engagement.

In Kuala Lumpur on 14 April 2012, student activists camped out at Independence Square and marched against a government loan program that they said charged students high interest rates and left them with debt.

The largest student movement in Malaysia is the Solidariti Mahasiswa Malaysia (SMM; Student Solidarity of Malaysia). This is a coalition group that represents numerous student organizations. Currently, SMM is actively campaigning against the UUCA and a free education at primary, secondary and tertiary level.

=== Mexico ===
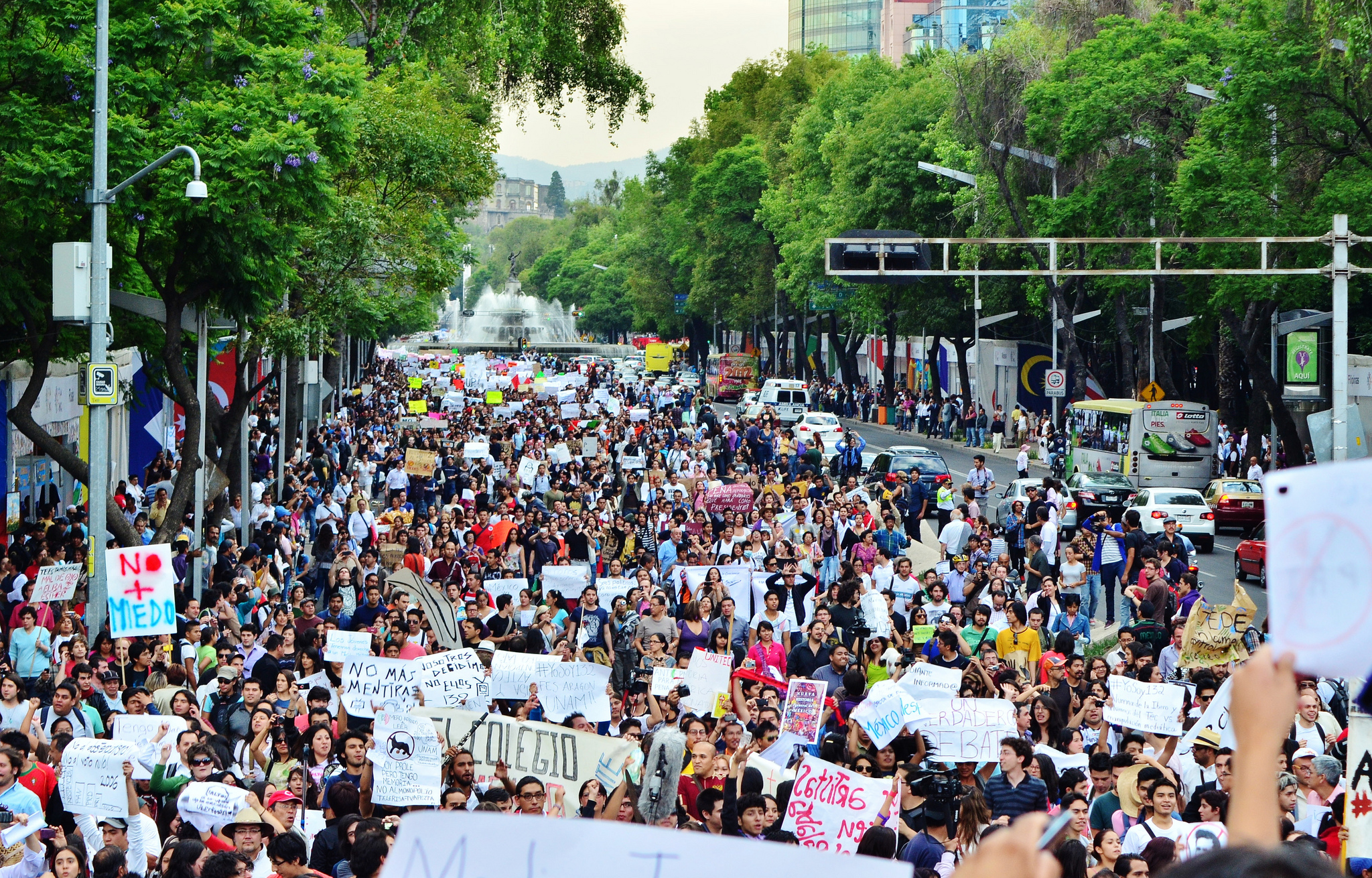
A Yo Soy 132 march, 2012

During the protests of 1968, Mexican military and police killed an estimated 30 to 300 students and civilian protesters. This killing is known as in the Tlatelolco massacre, and took place on October 2, 1968, in the Plaza de las Tres Culturas in the Tlatelolco section of Mexico City. The events are considered part of the Mexican Dirty War, when the government used its forces to suppress political opposition. The massacre occurred 10 days before the opening of the 1968 Summer Olympics in Mexico City.

More recent student movements include Yo Soy 132 in 2012. Yo Soy 132 was a social movement composed for the most part of Mexican university students from private and public universities, residents of Mexico, claiming supporters from about 50 cities around the world. It began as opposition to the Institutional Revolutionary Party (PRI) candidate Enrique Peña Nieto and the Mexican media's allegedly biased coverage of the 2012 general election. The name Yo Soy 132, Spanish for "I Am 132", originated in an expression of solidarity with the original 131 protest's initiators. The phrase drew inspiration from the Occupy movement and the Spanish 15-M movement. The protest movement was self-proclaimed as the "Mexican spring" (an allusion to the Arab Spring) by its first spokespersons, and called the "Mexican occupy movement" in the international press.

Following the 2014 Iguala mass kidnapping, students responded nationally in protest from marches to destruction of property. Through social media, hashtags such as #TodosSomosAyotzinapa spread and prompted global student response.

=== Norway ===
Similar to the students of Sweden, many student activists have emerged in Norway to protest climate change. While Norway is commonly viewed as a model country when it comes to combating climate change, students in Norway say there's more to be done. Though the country has put forth many internal climate combating initiatives, students worry over the country's exportation of oil and gas.

=== Pakistan ===
Historically throughout Pakistan, university students have led protests against dictatorships and militant regimes. In the 1960s, the National Student Federation and the Peoples student federation worked together to protest against their current militant regime. That regime was run by General Ayub Khan, the second president of Pakistan.

In 2012, Malala Yousafzai was shot by the Taliban when standing up for the right of girls in Pakistan to receive an education. Surviving the attack, Yousafzai continued on as an activist for women's education. She has since written two books stressing the importance of girl's education not only in her home of Pakistan, but also around the world. Her first book, I Am Malala, details her own experience; while her second book, We Are Displaced, details the lives of girls she met from refugee camps. In 2014, she became the youngest person to receive a Nobel Peace Prize. She was 17 years of age upon accepting the award.

=== Philippines ===
Student activism in the Philippines saw a surge during the Ferdinand Marcos regime in the late 1960s and early 1970s during the First Quarter Storm before the declaration of Martial Law. Until today, student activism continues for various causes such as for free education, corruption within the government, and extrajudicial killings. Some groups that lead these protests are the League of Filipino Students (LFS), National Union of Students of the Philippines (NUSP), Anakbayan, Kabataan Party-List and Samahan ng Progresibong Kabataan.

=== Russia ===
The Russian Empire, the Soviet Union, and the post-Soviet Russian Federation have all had extensive student activist movements.

=== South Africa ===
In the 1970s, students in South Africa contributed to the movement against the apartheid. On June 16, 1976, students congregated in what would come to be known at the Soweto Uprising. Here, they led a peaceful protest in response to the Bantu Education Act of 1953. In an attempt to break apart the protest, police met the students with violence and force. The violence that ensued during the uprising led many to sympathize with the protesting students. The exposed nature of the apartheid caused an international abhorrence leading to its deconstruction.

=== Sweden ===
In 2018, Greta Thunberg caught international attention when she began missing classes to protest climate change. What began as sitting outside Sweden's parliament with fliers in hand, quickly became an international student movement. On March 15, 2019, students from more than 130 countries skipped school for the global climate strike.

=== Taiwan ===
The Sunflower Student Movement in 2014 advocated for independence from China and some of its leaders went on to form the pro-democracy New Power Party in 2015.

The Anti Black Box Movement in 2015 challenged opaque education reforms and reformers.

=== Thailand ===
The overthrow of Thai leader Field Marshall Thanom Kittikachorn was primarily led by students. Called the October 14, 1973 Uprising, students were successful in overthrowing his military dictatorship and restoring democracy. In addition to Thanom, they also overthrew deputy Field Marshall Praphas Charusathien. After Thanom was overthrown he was forced into exile, but in 1976 returned to become a monk. Although he swore to stay out of politics, the presence of him caused student protests to begin again. On October 6, 1976, many protestors died at the hands of right-wing militants that had torn through Thammasat University.

Left-wing students are now known to protest any Thanom-styled regime.

Students played a very important role in the ongoing 2020 Thai protests. Students from many parts of Thailand are participating in a series of pro-democracy movements against Thai government under Prime Minister Prayuth Chan-o-cha. One instance saw a debate between students and Education Minister Nataphol Teepsuwan who used to be a part of the anti-democratic People's Democratic Reform Committee that called for Prayuth to staged 2014 Thai coup d'état.

=== Uganda ===
Uganda has the second youngest population in the world, with rising numbers of university students seeking improved employment opportunities. Over the last 100 years since the establishment of the first Ugandan university, these students have been especially politically engaged. The structure of the university government system encourages political action, as student leadership positions are viewed as extensions of government elections and parties. During British colonialism and independence, students have played a crucial role in protesting government leadership with varied success.

=== United Kingdom ===
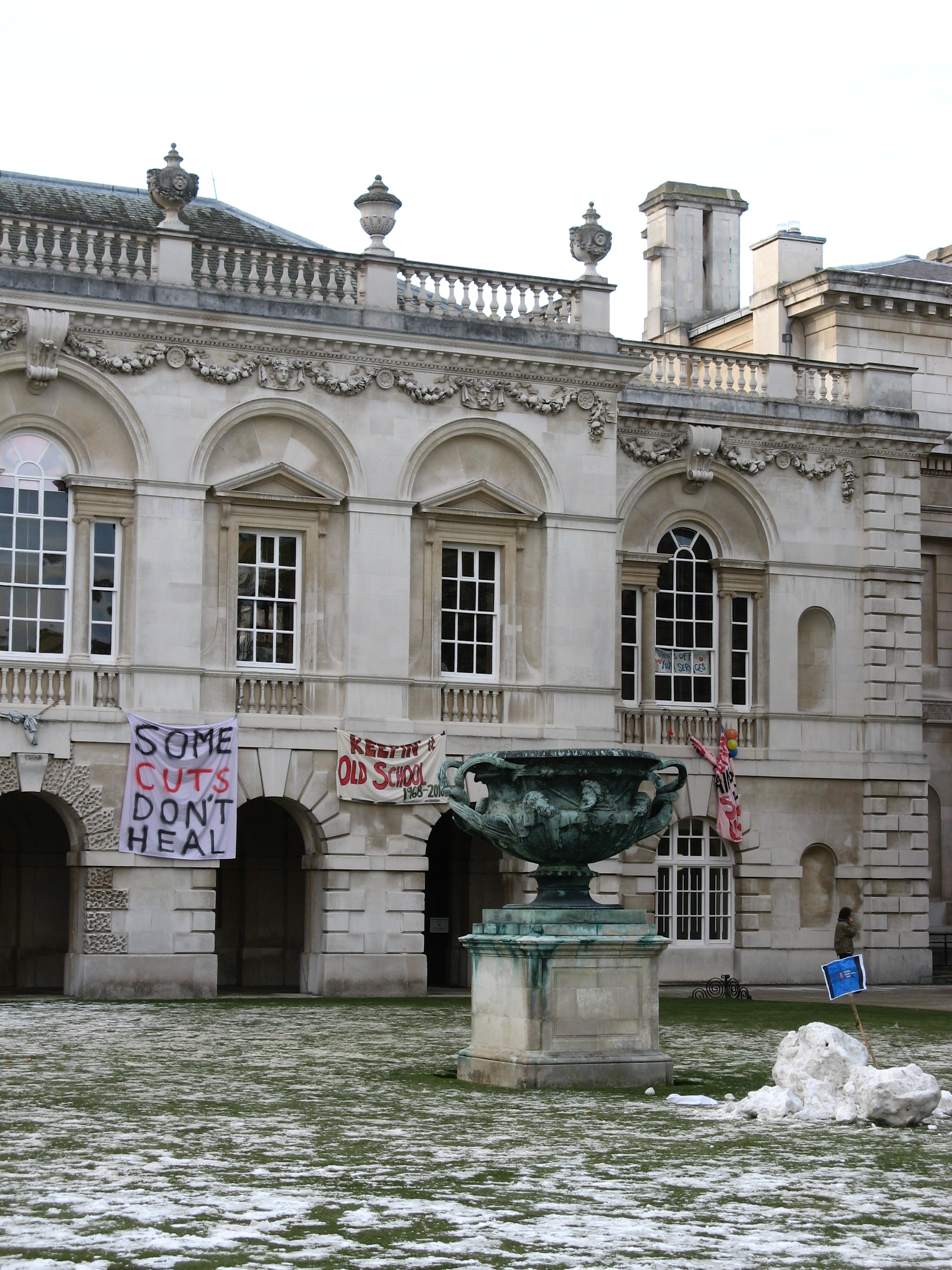
Student occupation at Cambridge University, 2010

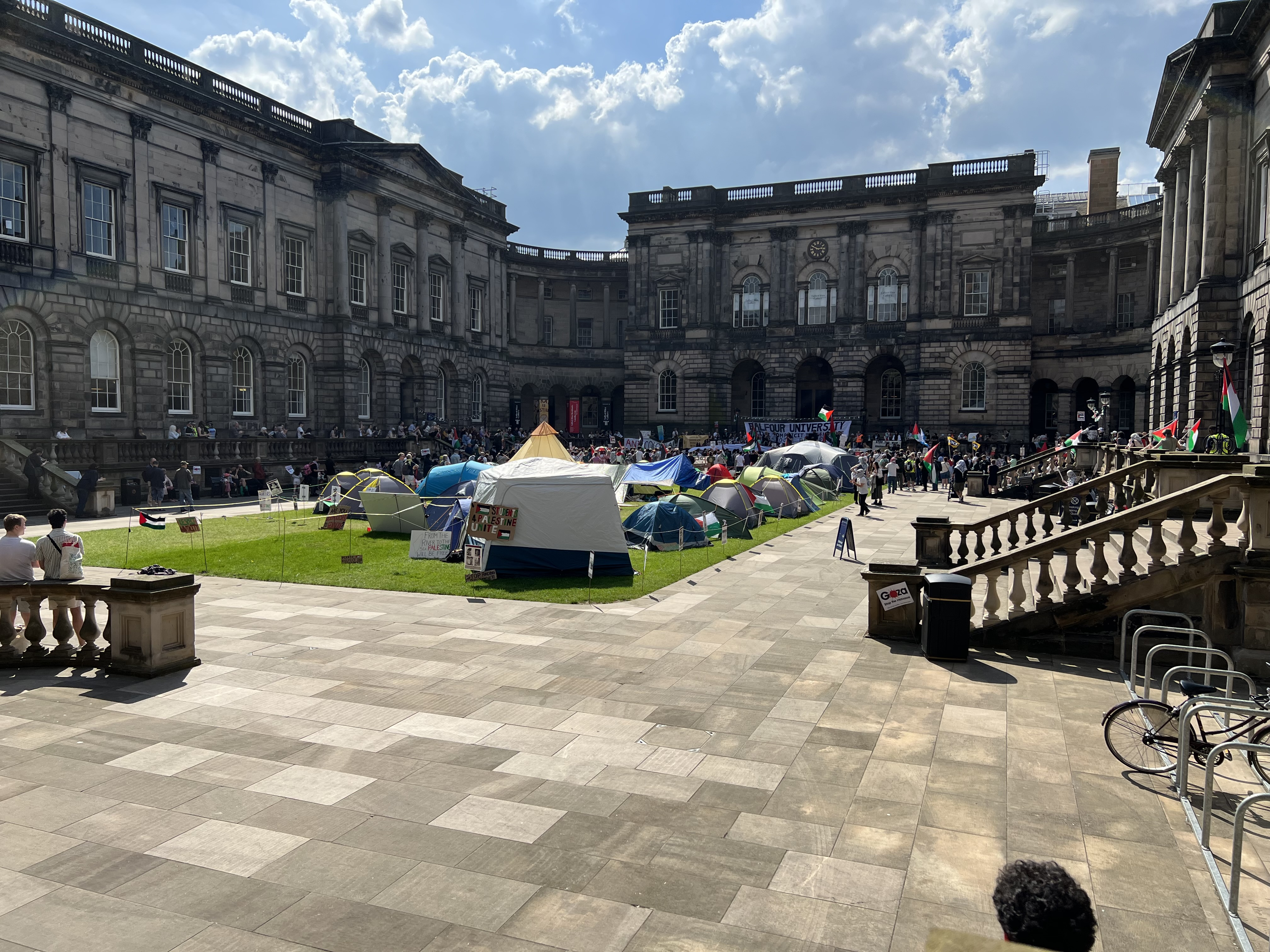
Edinburgh University student Gaza protest, Old College Quad encampment, May 2024.

Student political activism has existed in U.K since the 1880s with the formation of the student representative councils, precursors of union organisations designed to present students interests. These later evolved into unions, many of which became part of the National Union of Students (NUS) formed in 1921. However, the NUS was designed to be specifically outside of "political and religious interests", reducing its importance as a centre for student activism. During the 1930s students began to become more politically involved with the formation of many socialist societies at universities, ranging from social democratic to Marxist–Leninist and Trotskyist, even leading to Brian Simon, a communist, becoming head of the NUS.

However, it was not until the 1960s that student activism became important in British universities. The Vietnam war and issues of racism initiated a focus on other local frustrations, such as fees and student representation. In 1962, the first student protest against the Vietnam War was held, with CND. However, student activism did not begin on a large scale until the mid-1960s. In 1965, a student protest of 250 students was held outside Edinburgh's American embassy and the beginning of protests against the Vietnam war in Grovesnor square. It also saw the first major teach-in in Britain in 1965, where students debated the Vietnam War and alternative non-violent means of protest at the London School of Economics, sponsored by the Oxford Union.

In 1966 the Radical Student Alliance and Vietnam Solidarity Campaign were formed, both of which became centres for the protest movement. However, the first student sit-in was held at the London School of Economics in 1967 by their Students' union over the suspension of two students. Its success and a national student rally of 100,000 held in the same year is usually considered to mark the start of the movement. Up until the mid-1970s student activities were held including a protest of up to 80,000 strong in Grosvenor Square, anti-racist protests and occupations in Newcastle, the breaking down of riot control gates and forced closure of the London School of Economics, and Jack Straw becoming the head of the NUS for the RSA. However, many protests were over more local issues, such as student representation in college governance, better accommodation, lower fees or even canteen prices.

Student protests erupted again in 2010 during the Premiership of David Cameron over the issue of tuition fees, higher education funding cuts and withdrawal of the Education Maintenance Allowance. Students did not achieve what they aimed for in preventing government's reforms. In areas such as Wales and Northern Ireland, the fees were not increased. As a result, fees did not remain the same across the nations.

During the wave of School Strikes for Climate in 2019, student strikes saw up to 300,000 school children on the streets in the UK, at protests organised by a network of local groups of youth climate activists. Umbrella campaign groups such as Scottish Youth Climate Strike in Scotland, Youth Climate Association Northern Ireland in Northern Ireland, and UK Student Climate Network in England and Wales, made demands to respective governments and local authorities on the back of these protests and achieved some successes, and continue to campaign for climate justice.

In May 2024, a group of student activists at the University of Edinburgh pitched tents in the Old College Quad to protest against what they alleged was the university's failure to divest itself of investments deemed proxy support for the Israeli invasion of the Gaza Strip. Eight of the protesters launched a hunger strike.

=== United States ===
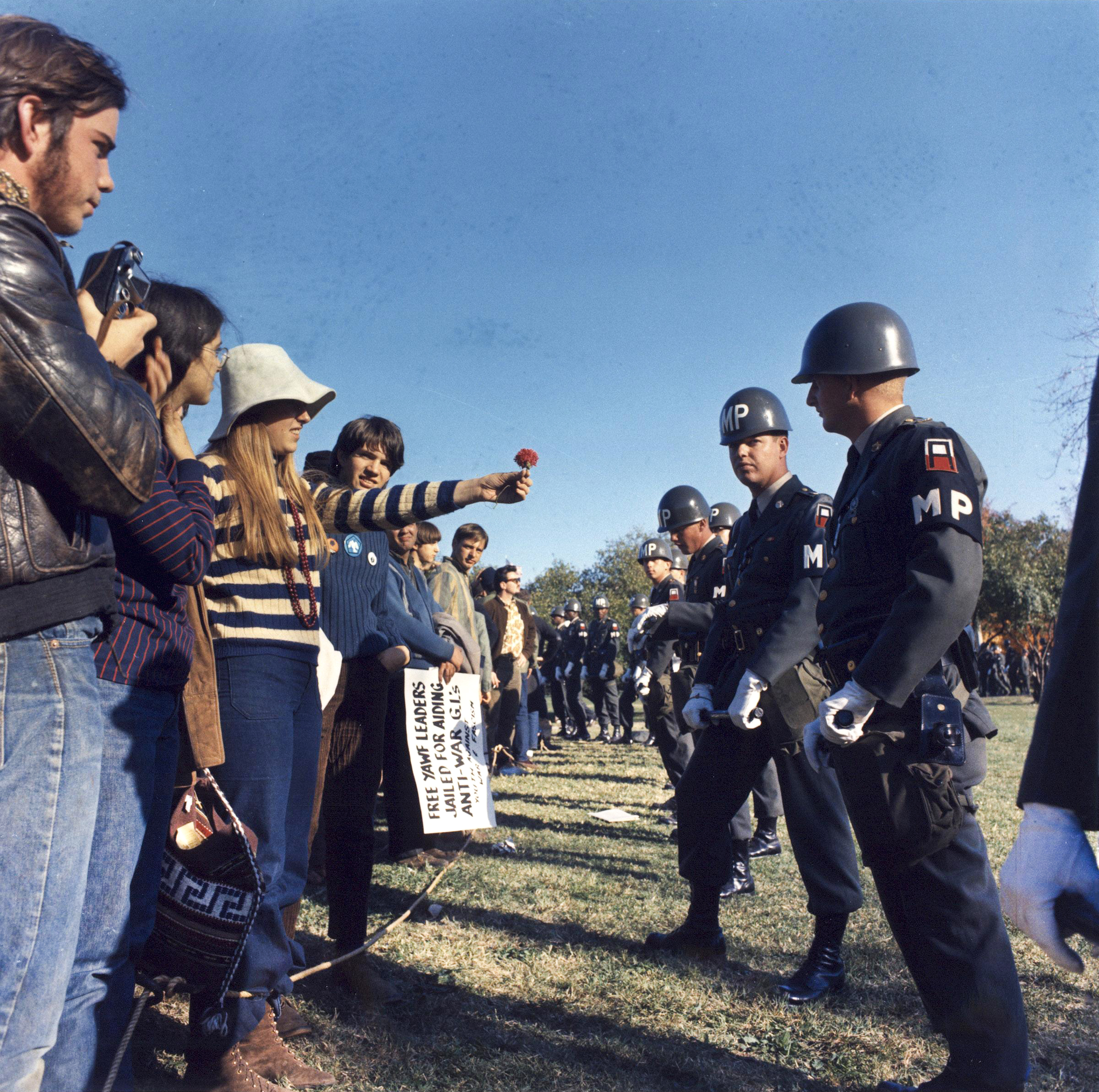
A US demonstration against the Vietnam War, 1967

In the United States, student activism is often understood as a form of youth activism that has been most notable in its role in nonviolent protests regarding civil rights, anti-war sentiments, and environmental issues. Whether by way of campus protests, lobbying for state legislators, or global climate strikes, student activism has played a pivotal role in guiding societal concerns towards the development and implementation of significant policies.

Some of the first well documented, directed activism occurred on the campuses of Black institutions like Fisk and Howard in the 1920s. At Fisk, students' concerns surrounding disciplinary rules designed to undermine black identity coalesced into demands for the resignation of President Fayette Avery McKenzie. Spurred by alum W.E.B. Du Bois' 1924 commencement speech, the students ignored the 10 p.m. curfew to protest, and staged subsequent walkouts. After a committee found Mckenzie's abilities and handling of the unrest poor, he resigned on April 16, 1925. Events at Fisk had wide repercussions, as black students elsewhere began to question the repressive status quo of the postwar black university.

In the 1930s, the American Youth Congress lobbied the US Congress against war and racial discrimination and for youth programs. It was heavily supported by First Lady Eleanor Roosevelt.

Perhaps the most notable and accomplished student groups in US History were the Student Nonviolent Coordinating Committee and the Atlanta Student Movement, predominantly African American groups that won passage of the Voting Rights Act of 1965.

The Free Speech Movement in 1964–65 at UC Berkeley used mass civil disobedience to overturn restrictions on on-campus political activities. The Free Speech Movement was the first US student movement that became a focus of scholarly attention into student activism.

In 1962, Rachel Carson wrote ‘Silent Spring,’ which served as a powerful exposé on the environmental devastation, caused by indiscriminate pesticide use, and the government's failure to protect public health and wildlife. Carson's critiques of the lack of state provisioning in the American water, and air sector resonated especially well with students, fueling them to mobilize. April 22, 1970, millions of students nationally participated in the world's first Earth Day. Founded by Gaylord Nelson, a Democrat from Wisconsin who was inspired by student anti-war protests, organized nationwide Earth Day ‘teach-ins’. This led to the emergence of key student groups like Pennsylvania, SLOP (Student League Opposing Pollution); Schenectady, New York, had YUK (Youth Uncovering Crud); and Cloquet, Minnesota, had SCARE (Students Concerned about a Ravaged Environment) to name a few These student-led groups in addition to other coalition groups began to apply overwhelming pressure on federal legislature, leading to the federal government to create the Environmental Protection Agency.

That same year, the largest student strike in American history took place in May and June 1970, in response to the Kent State shootings and the American invasion of Cambodia. Over four million students participated in this action.

The Disinvestment from South Africa movement involved many universities, starting with the University of California, Berkeley, where student activism helped it to become the first institution to disinvest completely from companies implicated in and profiting from apartheid.

In the 1990s, the popular education reform movement has led to a resurgence of populist student activism against standardized testing and teaching, as well as more complex issues including military/industrial/prison complex and the influence of the military and corporations in education.

Major contemporary campaigns include work for funding of public schools, against increased tuitions at colleges or the use of sweatshop labor in manufacturing school apparel (e.g. United Students Against Sweatshops), for increased student voice throughout education planning, delivery, and policy-making (e.g. The Roosevelt Institution), and to raise national and local awareness of the humanitarian consequences of the Darfur Conflict. Antiwar activism has also increased leading to the creation of the Campus Antiwar Network and the refounding of SDS in 2006.

In February 2018 after the Stoneman Douglas High School shooting, many students began to organize rallies and protests against gun violence. A huge series of protests including the March for Our Lives (MFOL) followed, drawing millions of protesters and notably attacking the NRA as well as US gun laws. A number of student activists such as X González who helped lead the protests quickly garnered media attention for their action. Later, these students created MFOL, a non-profit 501(c)(4) organization. A number of other students have followed their lead and created other youth organizations, including Team Enough, which is being overseen by the Brady Campaign, and Students Demand Action, which is being overseen by Everytown for Gun Safety.

Recent youth activism around youth voter turnout includes efforts like EighteenX18, an organization started by actress Yara Shahidi of ABC's Blacki-sh devoted to increased voter turnout in youth; OneMillionOfUs, a national youth voting and advocacy organization working to educate and empower 1 million young people to vote which started by Jerome Foster II.

Climate change has also been an issue for youth activists in the United States, including This is Zero Hour, an environmentally-focused youth organization started by Jamie Margolin.

2024 saw mass protests against the Gaza war and genocide, with protests on at least 60 campuses, with demands varying by campus but generally including divestment from Israel and severing ties with Israeli academic institutions.

== Student mobilizations ==
- Mexican Movement of 1968
- 2006 student protests in Chile
- 2011–2013 Chilean student protests
- 2011 Colombian student protests
- Yo Soy 132
- Night of the Pencils
- April 19 University Movement
- 2018 student protests in Colombia

== See also ==
- Intergenerational equity
- LGBT Student Movement
- List of social movements
- Youth empowerment
- Youth participation
- Youth rights
- Youth suffrage
- Youth voice
- Protests of 1968
- Argentine university reform of 1918

=== Organizations ===
- 180/Movement for Democracy and Education
- Akhil Bharatiya Vidyarthi Parishad
- Australian Student Environment Network
- Baloch Students Organization
- California Public Interest Research Group
- Canadian Federation of Students
- DoSomething
- Dwight Hall Socially Responsible Investment Fund
- Energy Action Coalition
- European Students' Union
- Federation of Student Nationalists
- Freechild Institute for Youth Engagement
- Idealist on Campus, a program of Action Without Borders
- Kerala Students Union
- Muslim Students' Association
- National Students Federation
- National Students Union of India
- National Youth Rights Association
- New York Public Interest Research Group
- North American Students of Cooperation
- People & Planet
- Secular Student Alliance
- Student Struggle for Soviet Jewry
- Student/Farmworker Alliance
- Students Coalition Against War
- Students for a Free Tibet
- Students for Justice in Palestine
- Students for Sensible Drug Policy
- Students' Federation of India
- United States Student Association
