= Hadas (disambiguation) =

Hadas is a Kuwaiti Islamist political organization. Hadas may also refer to

- Hadas (name)
- Hadass, a branch of the myrtle tree used on the Jewish holiday of Sukkot
- Machzikei Hadas, a Modern Orthodox synagogue in Ottawa, Ontario, Canada
