= SCAW =

SCAW may refer to:

- Sleeping Children Around the World
- Students Coalition Against War

== See also ==
- The Scaw
- Skaw (disambiguation)
