= Hadas (name) =

Hadas (Hebrew: הדס) is a Jewish name that may refer to the following notable people:

Given name

- Hadas Gold (born 1988), American media and business reporter
- Hadas Malada-Matzri (born 1984), Ethiopian Israeli doctor
- Hadas Thier (born 1976), American activist, writer and journalist
- Hadas Yaron (born 1990), Israeli actress

Surname

- Eran Hadas, Israeli poet, software developer, new media artist and author
- Ishay Hadas (born 1955), Israeli television producer, voice-over actor and activist
- Moses Hadas (1900–1966), American teacher, classical scholar and translator
- Rachel Hadas (born 1948), American poet, teacher and translator, daughter of Moses
- Shmuel Hadas (1931–2010), Israeli diplomat
- Yacov Hadas-Handelsman (born 1957), Israeli Ambassador to Hungary

== See also ==
- František Hadaš I (1917–1995), Czech archer
