= Campus Antiwar Network =

American grassroots activist organization

Campus Antiwar Network (CAN) is an American independent grassroots network of students opposing the occupation of Iraq and military recruiters in US schools. It was founded prior to the 2003 invasion of Iraq, and claims to be the largest campus-based antiwar organization in the United States.

== History ==
The Campus Antiwar Network was created on January 17, 2003, by delegates from over 70 colleges and universities at twin conferences at George Washington University and San Francisco State University. Its purpose was opposition to the planned invasion of Iraq.

Because it is decentralized, CAN's size and impact do not necessarily correlate with its national events and organizations, but the group's history can be tracked roughly by its national conventions.

=== First National CAN Convention ===
Chicago, Illinois—February 22–23, 2003

CAN's first national conference occurred very soon after its formation, the weekend of February 22–23, in Chicago, and formalized the organization's structure and politics. The 2003 convention occurred during a period of rapid growth of the antiwar movement, just prior to the invasion of Iraq and soon after the February 15, 2003 anti-war protest, the largest in world history. The convention was attended by more than 350 delegates from approximately 100 campus groups.

At its 2003 convention, CAN adopted a structure under the principle that it be student owned and operated. The specific directives were:

CAN will remain independent, and is not affiliated with any other organization, though it pledges to work with all forces in the antiwar movement; it is democratic, so that each member campus can elect delegates through their local antiwar student coalitions and each affiliated campus group has an equal voice within CAN; CAN accepts affiliation from every campus or school antiwar organization and respects the right of its member committees to organize independent antiwar actions locally.

CAN adopted its first four Points of Unity:

1. No war on Iraq, whether backed by the U.S. or the United Nations
2. End the UN sanctions which have killed more than 1 million Iraqis
3. Oppose the attacks on civil liberties and racist scapegoating at home
4. Money for jobs, education, and health care, not war.

CAN also decided to call for an April 5 national mobilization in a few major cities following on the heels of the student-labor week of action already being organized from March 31 to April 4.

=== Second National CAN Convention ===
Chicago, Illinois—November 1–2, 2003

The U.S. antiwar movement lost momentum with the failure of mass protests to prevent the invasion, and the Campus Antiwar Network was affected by the trend. CAN's second convention, on November 1–2, 2003, was attended by approximately 100 members, from 34 different campuses around the country.

The primary goals of the activists were to discuss the past six months of work since CAN's creation in January, and to organize future goals as well as further codifying the Points of Unity. An important national action taken from this conference was the resurrection of the "black armband" as a symbol of antiwar unity; a throwback from the Vietnam War.

The Points of Unity were expanded into the following:

1. We stand opposed to all US wars of aggression.
2. We stand opposed to the occupation of Iraq.
3. We support the right of the Iraqi people to self-determination.
4. We demand the immediate withdrawal of all troops from Iraq.
5. We call for the US government to pay reparations to the Iraqi people.
6. We stand opposed to the oppression of the Palestinian people and the occupation of the West Bank and Gaza Strip.
7. We stand opposed to racist scapegoating and all attacks on civil liberties.
8. We demand money for education, jobs and health care, not war and occupation!

=== "Stop the War in 2004" ===
New York City, New York—November 13–14, 2004

Over 100 delegates from 30 schools were in attendance at "Stop the War in 2004," which was focused around recovering from the recent presidential election and the re-election of George W. Bush. The main speaker at the event was Mike Hoffman, co-founder of the Iraq Veterans Against the War, who spoke about the Iraqi response to the occupation.

CAN decided to increase positive interaction and support with military groups opposing the occupation of Iraq, as well as to organize demonstrations "against George Bush's inauguration."

Although all other Points were proposed to stand as created, the national conference revised the Point of Unity on the Israeli–Palestinian conflict:

We stand opposed to the oppression of the Palestinian people and the occupation of Palestinian land, and support the right of Palestinians to self-determination.

=== "On the Frontlines" ===
Berkeley, California—October 22–23, 2005

With falling approval ratings for President George W. Bush and the war, the growth of the counter-recruitment movement, and Cindy Sheehan's rise to national prominence, CAN grew significantly over the course of 2005. Its fourth national conference, held October 22–23, 2005, at UC Berkeley, drew over 650 participants, with delegates from 37 schools present to vote on the second, organizational, day.

The conference, jointly sponsored by the Campus Antiwar Network and Military Out of Our Schools-Bay Area, sought to deepen the growing counter-recruitment movement among students. It decided on several nationally coordinated events for the upcoming year: a day of action in protest of the Solomon Amendment requiring universities to allow military recruitment on December 6 of that year; a week of action marking the anniversary of the war in Iraq, with student actions planned on campuses and general, off-campus actions on the weekend of March 18–19, 2006; and a day of action on May 4, 2006, the anniversary of the killing of four students at Kent State by National Guardsmen during a protest against the Vietnam War, as well as a memorial for the lesser-known shooting of two Jackson State students on May 14. CAN's call for the student week of action was endorsed by many individuals and organizations including Cindy Sheehan, Howard Zinn, and the Progressive Democrats of America.

CAN's Points of Unity and national structure were unchanged.

=== "Students Rising" ===
Madison, Wisconsin—October 19–21, 2007

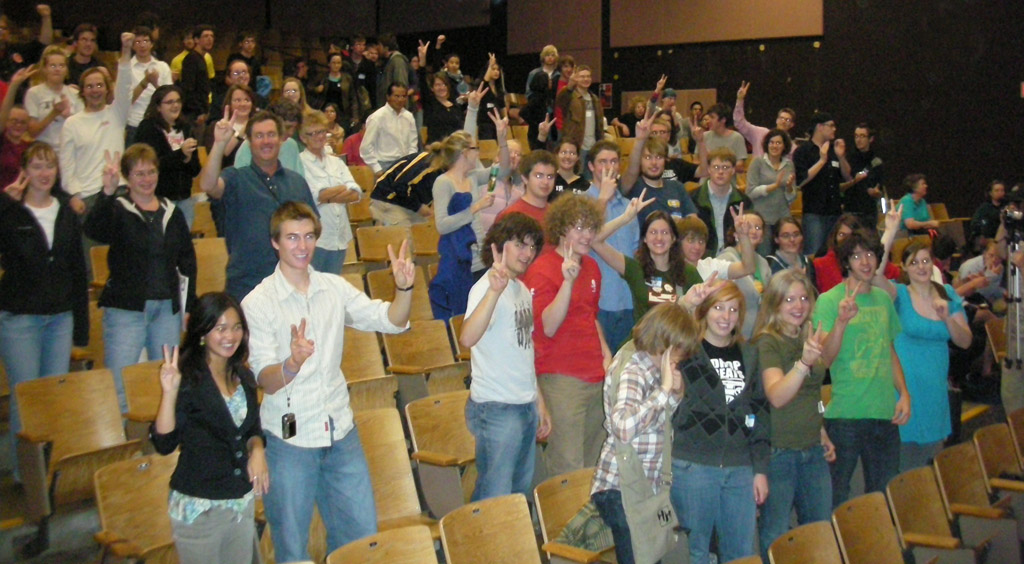
Activists listen to Camilo Mejía's speech at CAN's fifth national conference in Madison.

The surge in the antiwar movement in late 2005 did not last through 2006, and over the course of that year the Campus Antiwar Network lost much of its national organization, rebuilding only in the spring of 2007. After a one-year hiatus without a national conference, CAN reconvened over the weekend of October 19–21, 2007, to discuss its Points of Unity and to solidify membership. Over 30 chapters sent representatives, with an estimated 200 activists (both delegates and guests) attending. The main event was speaker Camilo Mejía, who talked about his time in Iraq and his gradual realization of his antiwar feelings. Mejía and Liam Madden, both members of the Iraq Veterans Against the War, were in attendance throughout the conference.

CAN revised its Points of Unity into the following Unity Statement:

The Campus Antiwar Network stands for the immediate withdrawal from Iraq of all occupation troops and private contractors. CAN is committed to building a movement based on grassroots, democratic and independent organizing that actively opposes all forms of racism, Islamophobia, sexism and homophobia.

== Structure ==
The Campus Antiwar Network is a network of largely independent affiliates which choose their own day-to-day goals and tactics. CAN brings them together, usually only by email and conference call, to share the lessons of experience, discuss and decide on a view of the present needs of the peace movement, assist each other in defending against threatened disciplinary action or prosecution, and plan coordinated actions on both national and regional levels. Major decisions regarding structure and points of unity are made at CAN's yearly national conference, attended by 2 delegates with voting rights from each chapter, as well as an unlimited number of guests.

The organization also has a coordinating committee, elected at each national conference. As of the nation conference in 2007, the national committee has been restructured from previous forms to have five regional representatives and four at-large representatives, with decisions made by majority rule. In the past, the committee has had one representative from each of five regions, five at-large representatives, and two high school representatives.

Individual CAN affiliates organize as they choose, although each is asked to select two members to give their contact information to the national coordinating committee. The coordinating committee is responsible for coordinating actions voted on at the national conference.

== Politics ==
CAN's only formal political consensus stems from its Points of Unity, or Unity Statement, selected at the national conference. CAN periodically updates its Points of Unity based on the current state of the war and antiwar movement.

CAN is first and foremost a group opposed to the war in Iraq. However, besides calling for immediate withdrawal of all U.S. troops from Iraq, Points of Unity have included opposition to the war in Afghanistan, opposition to Israel's occupation of Palestine, and other views. Although some opinions are more controversial than others, CAN strives to reflect the viewpoints of its democratic and varying membership. CAN affiliates are involved in actions around these issues to varying degrees, and individual members may or may not agree with all points; CAN chapters are welcome to choose their own political positions and affiliations beyond the Points of Unity that all chapters follow.

Throughout its history, CAN has put opposition to US military recruitment and building relationships with antiwar U.S. veterans and soldiers at the center of its strategy to end the war. CAN does not take official positions on elections of any kind, believing that such choices should be based on individual preferences. However, CAN actively encourages members and chapters to become as informed on elections as possible, and local chapters often incorporate political discussions into their own meetings.

After Hurricane Katrina, by decision of its coordinating committee, CAN adopted the slogan "Relief Not War!" for the September 25, 2005 protest in Washington, DC. This issue was connected to the war, for CAN members, by the repressive military nature of the relief efforts as well as by the diversion of resources abroad. In February 2006, CAN issued a statement on the Danish cartoons controversy, condemning "racism in any form, as recently displayed in the publication of a series of anti-Islamic cartoons," which it argued "are helping to promulgate state violence against Muslims and Arabs -- including the occupation of Iraq." The statement also attacked the Dubai Ports World controversy, describing widespread bipartisan opposition to allowing a company from the United Arab Emirates to take ownership of some U.S. port operations as "blatantly racist." Anti-racism points of unity were integrated into the Unity Statement in 2007.

== Tactics ==
- National demonstrations: CAN helped to mobilize students for the national February 15, 2003 antiwar protest demonstrations prior to the invasion of Iraq, and more recently marched with a contingent estimated by organizers at two thousand people at the September 24, 2005 anti-war protest in Washington, DC. It has also called its own national actions. For example, CAN called for and organized a day of action on December 6, 2005, the date that the Supreme Court heard FAIR v. Rumsfeld, a case deciding the constitutionality of the Solomon Amendment's provision denying federal funding to colleges that ban military recruiters. The action consisted of protests at recruiting stations across the country.
- Referendums: CAN helped write and campaign for the "College Not Combat" ballot measure passed by residents of San Francisco on November 2, 2005, described by proponents as a statement that voters "want it to be city policy to oppose military recruiters’ access to public schools and to consider funding scholarships for education and training that could provide an alternative to military service."
- Direct aid: CAN sent caravans to New Orleans from places such as New York and Chicago, after Hurricane Katrina. These brought supplies and volunteers to work with local Louisiana activists, such as Malik Rahim, towards hurricane relief. The New York students kept a journal of their activities called "This is solidarity, not charity".
- Talks, debates, and speaking tours: In Fall of 2003, the Campus Antiwar Network (CAN) and Muslim Students' Association (MSA) organized a national speaking tour titled "Speaking Truth to Empire." The tour's purpose was to reorganize the student antiwar movement. Featured speakers included Noam Chomsky, Rania Masri, Howard Zinn, as well as military families and veterans. Following this, CAN and MSA co-sponsored another tour called "Eyewitness to Empire," which featured CAN member, Khury-Petersen Smith, who traveled to Iraq and spent a week in Baghdad during January 2004.
- Petitions, letters, and phone calls to school and government officials.
- Creative performances of various kinds, involving, for example, spoken word poetry and hip hop artists.
- International collaboration. CAN sent delegates to the London International Peace Conference on December 10, 2005. CAN also put on a panel discussion called "Fighting the Empire From Within," featuring CAN activists involved in military "counter-recruitment," war resister Pablo Paredes, and others, at the 2006 World Social Forum in Caracas, Venezuela. More recently, CAN has nationally decided to get involved with the Iraqi Student Project, a humanitarian aid project which seeks to bring Iraqi college students to America for higher education.
- Blockades and Direct Action: CAN claimed sector 6 in the RNC Welcoming Committee map at the St Paul Republican National Convention in 2008, where they attempted to block Republican delegates from reaching the excel center in an attempt to prevent a quorum. Six members were arrested at the RNC, one was charged with conspiracy to riot, felony.

=== Student walkouts ===
Campus Antiwar Network chapters have long used local walkouts as a tactic to demonstrate against the militarization of campus and collusion with war related activities while galvanizing public opinion on campus, unifying CAN groups with other progressive groups, and recruiting new members. The network is able to utilize the internet and conference calls to rapidly create walk outs, although most of the largest walkouts are on specific anniversaries or important dates.

Several walkouts occurred immediately after the US invasion of Iraq including a large one at San Francisco State University. In 2005, a walkout took place at the University of Wisconsin in Madison. Over 100 students left class, demonstrated, and then marched past the Army Recruitment Center at University Square.

In 2007, large walkouts occurred as a result of the efforts of CAN groups. On February 15, the fourth anniversary of the largest antiwar demonstrations in history, walkouts occurred at 17 different schools including Columbia University. The Columbia walkout achieved campus-wide support including a petition signed by forty professors and an endorsement by three campus unions. Three hundred students participated in the antiwar activities that followed.

On March 20, 2007, the fourth anniversary of the invasion of Iraq, nearly 80 schools answered calls from Campus Antiwar Network and Students for a Democratic Society to walk out of class in protest of the war. Hundreds of students from schools across the country walked out against the war and demonstrated in highly visible locations. At Rutgers University in New Brunswick New Jersey, 400 students walked out of class, blocked a marine recruiting station, and took over an interstate highway.

CAN views walkouts as a good way to get students involved with the antiwar movement for the first time. As many students fight against the apathy that is the generalization of their generation, viewing fellow collegiates in action is important to continue growing the movement.

== Repression ==
A number of people involved with the Campus Antiwar Network have faced legal or disciplinary consequences of various kinds for their antiwar activism. These people have been the centers of nationwide defense campaigns on the part of CAN, which argues that their cases prove the threat counter-recruitment poses to the powers that be. Mostly, it has been local students expelling CAN members from their campus antiwar work. Such an incident took place at Southern Connecticut State University.

- In March 2004, at City College of New York, four people were arrested at a counter-recruitment protest (after twice, at earlier protests, forcing recruiters off campus) for allegedly assaulting campus security, though they claim that the reverse was the case. One, Hadas Thier, was banned from campus and suspended. Charges have since been dropped.
- Charles Peterson at Holyoke Community College was pepper sprayed, banned from campus, (because he was not a student there... this was a major tactic of CAN's organizing operation.) and threatened with expulsion after allegedly assaulting a campus security officer while protesting military recruiters; he claims that he merely grabbed back a sign the officer took from a fellow protester. Charges have since been dropped.
- Tariq Khan, a student at George Mason University and Air Force veteran, was arrested for standing near recruiters with a sign saying "Recruiters Tell Lies" taped to his shirt on the charge of trespassing and disorderly conduct. Khan is a Pakistani-American; he reported that one arresting officer told him, "You people are the most violent people in the world." Charges have since been dropped.
- Dave Airhart, a student at Kent State and a Marine veteran of Iraq and Afghanistan, was fined by city police and threatened with expulsion after hanging a banner with an antiwar message on a climbing wall set up on campus by military recruiters. Charges have since been dropped.
- Seven students at Hampton University were punished for participating in an unauthorized protest and "proselytizing" during a walkout on November 2, 2005. The students were initially summoned for an administrative hearing on November 21 to present a case against their expulsion, with three days notice, but it was then postponed to December 2, and finally the school decided only to impose community service.

All of these veterans have since renounced their involvement with CAN.

=== "Credible Threat" to National Security ===
On April 5, 2005, Santa Cruz students and 3 members of the Campus Antiwar Network led a major demonstration on the campus of UC Santa Cruz. According to the San Francisco Chronicle, "about a dozen protesters entered a career fair in a campus building and surrounded a table where military recruiters sat, preventing other students from talking with them. [And] more than 300 people demonstrated outside. In the jostling that ensued, a career- center staffer was slightly injured." The protest had significant results, according to Kristin Anderson, a member of the Campus Antiwar Network. She believes that counter recruitment "has gotten popular because it gives students something concrete they can do" and students are able to make connections if they see their classmates being tempted by recruiters. UC Santa Cruz antiwar group, "Members of Students Against War" rallied outside of the "San Francisco's Civic Center" wearing T-shirts reading, "Credible Threat." This was done to mock the "Pentagon spymasters' assessment of the group's activities."

== See also ==
- List of anti-war organizations
- List of peace activists
