= Skaw =

Skaw may refer to:

- Skaw, Unst, a village in the north east of the Shetland Islands
- Skaw, Whalsay, a village in the east of the Shetland Islands

== See also ==
- The Scaw
- SCAW (disambiguation)
