= 180/Movement for Democracy and Education =

180/Movement for Democracy and Education or MDE was a U.S. national campus activist organization active from 1998 to 2004. Its mission was

"dedicated to helping build a campus-based movement for political empowerment and participatory democracy. Through education and organizing we hope to encourage a radical political presence in our schools to transform them and our communities into truly democratic spaces."

Its main goal was fighting against the corporatization of education, and subsequently aiming toward "campus democracy." In its mission statement it said,

We oppose corporate control of the university and society, inequitable and disempowering elementary education, shrinking access to higher education, and the racism, sexism, homophobia, and other forms of systemic oppression in our world. We support all efforts in these and other struggles for democratic empowerment; the focus of our organizing will evolve in practice. Our goal is to help build a mass movement to reinvigorate a political culture of engaged democracy and social justice in our schools, in our communities, across our country and beyond.

== History ==
MDE had its beginnings through the renewed anti-corporate sentiment that emerged in the mid-1990s, and took off in different forms of student activism, such as the Pepsi boycott in solidarity with Burma. In 1996, Democracy Unlimited of Wisconsin, Cooperative staffer Ben Manski, together with John E. Peck and others, coordinated the "National Teach-Ins on Corporations, Education, and Democracy." This became the "Democracy Teach-Ins," and in their first year occurred on over 120 campuses. Their central question was, "can we pursue democracy and social justice when corporations are allowed to control so much wealth and power?" The next year another series of teach-ins were organized on some 246 campuses, with more sentiment for a national campus organization coming up. At the Campus Democracy Convention at the UW-Madison in 1998, the 180/ Movement for Democracy and Education was founded.

MDE was noted for confronting the transformation of the university into a corporate entity. The solution to corporatization, with the undemocratic nature of corporate structures, was to increase campus democracy. MDE also organized Teach-ins on campuses leading up to the WTO protests in Seattle in 1999, and analyzed the effects of WTO policies on higher education.

During this time a new student activist organization was formed in the labor movement-financed United Students Against Sweatshops, and MDE chapters often were dually-affiliated. In 2000 the two organizations jointly organized a conference in Eugene, Oregon.

In 2001, right after the attacks of September 11, MDE initiated what became the National Youth and Student Peace Coalition, the first major student anti-war coalition of the current moment. NYSPC organized the Books Not Bombs student walkouts on March 5, 2003, just before the Iraq invasion, showing student resistance to that upcoming war.

At its peak at least 15 chapters were affiliated with MDE. It eventually collapsed in 2004 for lack of funding. It has been succeeded in spirit by the Democratizing Education Network, an initiative of the Liberty Tree Foundation for the Democratic Revolution.
