= Hadas Malada-Matzri =

Ethiopian-Israeli female doctor in the Israel Defense Forces

- הדס מלדה-מצרי
- Born: 1984; Ethiopia
- Education: Ben Gurion University of the Negev
- Occupations: Doctor, activist
- Known for: First Ethiopian Israeli female doctor in the Israel Defense Forces

Dr. Hadas Malada-Matzri (Hebrew: הדס מלדה-מצרי; born 1984) is the first Ethiopian Israeli female doctor in the Israel Defense Forces.

Malada-Matzri was born in Ethiopia and emigrated to Israel in 1988 in Operation Solomon. At that time, she suffered from malnutrition and malaria that she had contracted in a Sudan refugee camp. She spent her first six months in Israel in rehabilitation and has said in interviews that this experience is what led her to become a doctor.

She earned a medical degree from Ben Gurion University of the Negev and served for five years as a medical officer with the rank of captain in the Israel Defense Forces.

She is an activist against racism and works to promote the full inclusion of Ethiopian children in educational and social opportunities. Malada-Matzri helped found the Ethiopian Israeli Health Promotion Forum, a group of over 400 doctors, nurses, and other health professionals from Ethiopian Israeli backgrounds.
