= 2005 San Francisco Proposition I =

Proposition I ("College Not Combat") was a ballot measure passed by residents of San Francisco, California on November 8, 2005. This proposition, which does not carry enforcement power, declared the city's opposition to military recruitment in public high schools and universities and stated that money should instead be directed toward scholarships. The proposition was written by Todd Chretien. Its proponents described its passage as a statement that voters "want it to be city policy to oppose military recruiters' access to public schools and to consider funding scholarships for education and training that could provide an alternative to military service."

Fox News host Bill O'Reilly, however, responded to the passage of Proposition I on his radio show, by saying:

You know, if I'm the president of the United States, I walk right in to Union Square, I set up my little presidential podium, and I say listen, citizens of San Francisco, if you vote against military recruiting, you're not going to get another nickel in federal funds. Fine. You want to be your own country? Go right ahead. And if al Qaeda comes in here and blows you up, we're not going to do anything about it. We're going to say, look, every other place in America is off limits to you except San Francisco. You want to blow up the Coit Tower? Go ahead.

O'Reilly further debated the comments on his Fox News Channel television program The O'Reilly Factor with Chretien on November 14, 2005, with O'Reilly claiming it was a "satirical reference."

== Results ==
Electoral results by supervisorial district

Measure I
Choice	Votes	%
For	125,581	59.15
Against	86,723	40.85
Total	212,304	100.00
Valid votes	212,304	92.42
Invalid/blank votes	17,410	7.58
Total votes	229,714	100.00
Registered voters/turnout		53.61
