= Students Coalition Against War =

Youth organization based in Canada

The Students Coalition Against War, or SCAW is a Canadian organization with members in Halifax, Nova Scotia, Edmonton, Alberta, Victoria, British Columbia, Ottawa, Ontario and Gatineau, Quebec. SCAW is a grassroots social movement dedicated to creating and fostering progressive social change. SCAW focuses on public education, non-violent activism, organizing, advocacy and reform. They aim to address and propose solutions – in a definitive and comprehensive manner – to the major social, economic and political issues, which induce, promote and sustain contemporary war, in all its forms worldwide.

Such forms of modern warfare include, but are in no way limited to: both inter/intra state wars, violations of fundamental human rights as defined by the Universal Declaration of Human Rights, the various forms of non-democratic economic reforms which invariably undermine social well being, and the numerous systems of domination, discrimination, and oppression such as racism, individualism, and imperialism. The various types of activities and activism employed by SCAW include: research and public education, media activism, civil disobedience, direct action, and other traditional as well as new and innovative forms of activism, advocacy, campaigning and protest.

Although initiated as a student organization, SCAW is a free and open social movement; it is fully democratic, decentralized and non-hierarchical in its structure and decision-making. One of the central aspects of SCAW is to promote the unification of both goals and tactics, thereby using methods that reflect the values they seek to see applied on a global scale.

== History ==
SCAW was first formed in 1999 in Edmonton, Alberta by a small group of socially conscious students at the University of Alberta. When one of the founding members moved to Victoria, British Columbia, SCAW was started in that city as well. SCAW Halifax began in late 2004 when a member of SCAW Edmonton moved to Halifax. SCAW Ottawa was founded independently of the other SCAWs in January 2005, with the merging of several smaller campus anti-war groups. All four SCAWs are currently very active in their communities and work all a wide variety of projects surrounding issues of war worldwide, be that armed conflict or ideological.

== SCAW Ottawa ==
SCAW Ottawa was formed in early 2005 out of the demonstrations against George W. Bush's visit to Ottawa on November 30, 2004. SCAW was initially an alliance of Carleton University and University of Ottawa students. Groups that merged into SCAW included the smaller campus anti-war group Global Peace Coalition. Organizations that originally helped build SCAW included Opirg-Carleton, Opirg-Ottawa and the Carleton International Socialists.

SCAW's first action was March 19, 2005 on the second anniversary of the Iraq War. SCAW rallied at the University of Ottawa and marched to the intersection of Rideau and Sussex and occupied the intersection with 130 students for thirty minutes before leaving to join the city-wide rally.

At Carleton University on September 22, 2005, SCAW organized an information picket of a speech by Chief of the Defence Staff, General Rick Hillier for his aggressive promotion of Canada's role in the invasion of Afghanistan. The picket caught the university's organizers off-guard when SCAW members flooded the microphones during question time. The moderator cut the question period short.

SCAW participated in the September 24, 2005 demonstration against the occupation of Iraq, gathering about 100 students in a feeder march to the main rally. SCAW organized a protest at the Prime Minister's residence on October 24, 2005 when Condoleezza Rice visited Prime Minister Paul Martin. 150 participated on short notice, at 6pm on a Monday. One member of SCAW was arrested during the protest.

On the third anniversary of the Iraq War, SCAW organized a street occupation of Rideau and Sussex for over an hour. It involved over 200 people, including a converted ambulance which hot food was served from in the below-zero temperatures. SCAW handed out an Afghanistan pamphlet during the protest. This was its first publication. Most recently, on March 30, 2006, members of SCAW attended a speech by Michael Ignatieff. In orange jumpsuits and black bags over their heads, four members of SCAW stood up, turned their backs to Ignatieff and stood during his entire speech holding anti-war, anti-torture placards.

In February 2008, a renewed SCAW at Carleton University began using a poster that read 'War Monger' accompanied with a picture of Stephen Harper. In a letter to the student newspaper, The Charlatan, a first-year student criticized the action, for which SCAW responded with a summary of their position against the war in Afghanistan.

== Membership and Politics ==
SCAW's membership is varied. In Ottawa organized groups within SCAW include Opirg-Carleton, Opirg-Ottawa, Carleton International Socialists, Students With A Collective Conscious and some members of the Carleton University Muslim Students' Association. SCAW has members at Algonquin College, Université du Québec en Outaouais and two CEGEPs, but no organized presence beyond Carleton University and the University of Ottawa. Its email list has 185 subscribers and its meetings range from 10 to 30 in attendance, and occasionally involve translation in French and English. Its recent pamphlet on Afghanistan was done with help from members of the Canadian Peace Alliance and University of Toronto's Students for Peace in Iraq.

SCAW opposes the occupation of Iraq, Afghanistan and Haiti, though Iraq and Afghanistan are generally more prominent in terms of activity. SCAW has also done work to help the War Resisters Support Campaign, especially in Ottawa, where SCAW-Carleton was part of a group of dozens of people who marched down Bank Street to show their support for the Campaign on January 26, 2008. The political composition of SCAW includes NDP members, International Socialists, anarchists, left liberals and many others.

== See also ==
- List of peace activists
