= Hadas Thier =

American journalist (born 1976)

- Born: 1976 (age 49–50); Rehovot, Israel
- Education: City College of New York (CUNY)
- Occupations: Journalist, author
- Website: hadasthier.com

Hadas Thier (born 1976) is an American writer, journalist, and activist based in Brooklyn, New York. She has written articles for Jacobin, In These Times, Teen Vogue, Dollars & Sense, and The Nation, delivering information and analysis on issues such as economics, American politics, and the Middle East. She is the author of A People's Guide to Capitalism: An Introduction to Marxist Economics (2020). She is also a member of the Democratic Socialists of America.

== Early life and education ==
Hadas Thier was born in Rehovot, Israel and later immigrated to the United States. She earned a bachelor's degree in history from the City College of New York.

At City College, while protesting military recruiters on campus, she was arrested and suspended from campus, along with two other students and one staff member ("The City College Four"). A national campaign eventually reinstated all four students and faculty, and the school dropped the charges. Thier also volunteered for Ralph Nader's presidential run in 2000 and was a member of the International Socialist Organization during the 2010s.

In an interview with Truthout she said that her success as a self-taught Marxist economist came from her experience as an activist: "Some of the best aspects of academia is that it encourages a certain intellectual rigor... There’s an organic version of that in the left activist community, which is that you’re accountable to your comrades. Nobody is grading you, but something more important is on the line of actually trying to work out these questions together and figure out the questions of the day."

== Career ==
Throughout her career, Hadas Thier has published news and opinion articles, most prominently for Jacobin Magazine, an American socialist magazine based in New York. Her writing emphasizes the perspectives of Democratic Socialist politicians, such as Bernie Sanders and Alexandria Ocasio-Cortez, in American politics. Thier's articles also feature critiques about the current American Democratic party and Republican party alike, often examining specific politicians, such as Joe Biden and Mike Bloomberg. Thier is a contributing author to two books on the topic of Israel and Palestine. She has conducted many interviews most notably about Marxism, capitalism, and economics for podcasts such as A World to Win, Citations Needed, Reply Guys, Haymarket Books Live, New Left Radio, and Jacobin Radio. She also produces a series of video shorts explaining Marxist Economics, called "Marxism in a Minute." Speaking to Nomiki Konst on the Nomiki Show, Thier argued, "[The economy] needs to be in the hands of the people. But in order for that to take place, in order for us to be able to make the kind of demands that we need to make, to organize our side properly, to ultimately overturn the way that the economy works, we have to understand it." Her perspective is marked by an emphasis on the dysfunction of capitalism, through a Marxist lens, and its tendency to result in economic crises and inequality.

In 2020, she published A People's Guide to Capitalism: An Introduction to Marxist Economics with Haymarket Books. The book was meant to provide an accessible read into the issues of capitalism, inequality, and economic crises, following the arc of Karl Marx's Capital. In a review for Climate and Capitalism, Michael Roberts wrote: "It is not easy explaining relatively complex ideas in a simple and clear manner. Ask any teacher. It’s a skill lacking in many. Hadas Thier has brilliantly succeeded in that challenge with her book introducing Marxist economics. She has delivered a clear, straightforward and entertaining explanation of all Marx’s basic theoretical insights into the nature and development of capitalism."

== Select publications ==
- Thier, Hadas (2020). "Under Capitalism, There’s No Such Thing as a “Fair Day’s Wage for a Fair Day’s Work”". Jacobin Magazine
- Thier, Hadas (2021). "The Global South Faces a 'Vaccine Apartheid'". In These Times
- Thier, Hadas (2022). "The War Over Public Water in Pennsylvania'". The Nation
