= Humanist Party (Spain) =

Political party in Spain

Humanist Party Partido Humanista
- Founded: 16 May 1984
- Ideology: Universal humanism Siloism
- Political position: Left-wing
- National affiliation: United Left (April–July 1986)
- International affiliation: Humanist International
- Congress of Deputies: 0 / 350
- Senate: 0 / 266
- European Parliament: 0 / 61 (Spanish seats)

Website
- www.partidohumanista.com

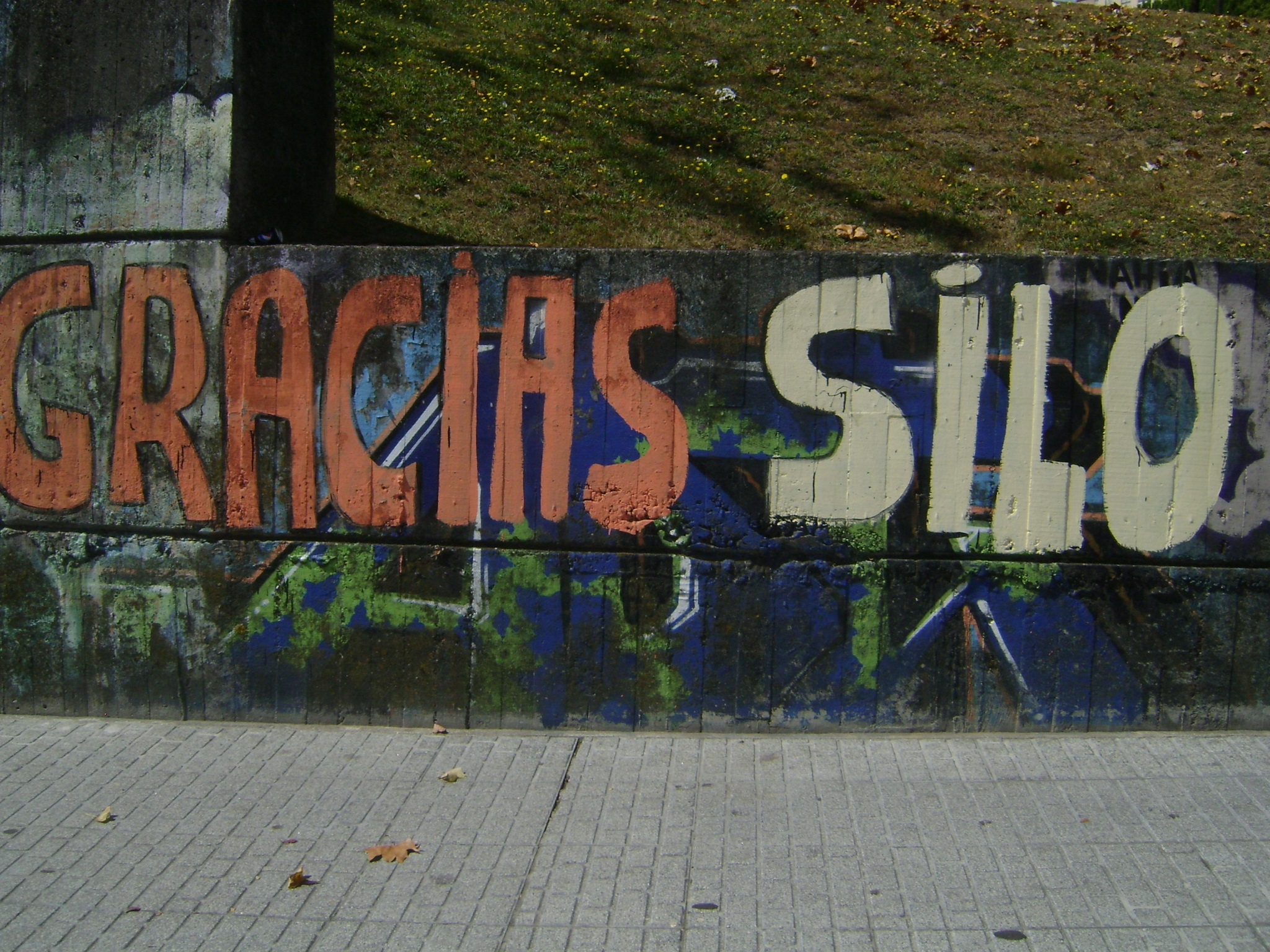
Thank you Silo Graffiti in A Coruña.

The Humanist Party (Spanish: Partido Humanista) is a Spanish political party founded in 1984. It is a member of the Humanist International.

== Election results ==
Election	Votes	%	Seats
Congress of Deputies
1989 general election	15,936	0.08	0 / 350
1993 general election	8,834	0.04	0 / 350
1996 general election	13,482	0.05	0 / 350
2000 general election	19,683	0.08	0 / 350
2004 general election	21,758	0.08	0 / 350
2008 general election	9,056	0.04	0 / 350
2011 general election	10,132	0.04	0 / 350
2015 general election	2,846	0.01	0 / 350
2016 general election	8,088	0.01	0 / 350
April 2019 general election	22,028	0.03	0 / 350
November 2019 general election	3,150	0.01	0 / 350
2023 general election	2,902	0.01	0 / 350
