= Anglican Pacifist Fellowship =

The Anglican Pacifist Fellowship (APF) is a body of people within the Anglican Communion who reject war as a means of solving international disputes, and believe that peace and justice should be sought through nonviolent means.

== Beliefs ==
In 2015, APF had more than 1100 members in forty countries who had signed the pledge stating "that our membership of the Christian Church involves the complete repudiation of modern war, pledge ourselves to renounce war and all preparation to wage war, and to work for the construction of Christian peace in the world..." By December 2019, this had declined to 544 members.

The key beliefs of members of the Fellowship are:

- that Jesus' teaching is incompatible with the waging of war.
- that a Christian church should never support or justify war.
- that our Christian witness should include opposing the waging or justifying of war.

Today, pacifism is recognised as a mainstream Anglican position, though it is not yet a dominant belief of the faith. "Numerous bishops have been Counsellors of APF and two, Wilfrid Westall, Bishop of Crediton, and Colin Scott, Assistant Bishop in the Diocese of Leicester, have chaired the Fellowship".

The current chairperson of APF as of 2018 is Sue Claydon.

=== Origins and early history ===
The Anglican Pacifist Fellowship was established in 1937, and now has some 1,400 members in over 40 countries, as well as a sister organisation, the Episcopal Peace Fellowship, in the United States of America. APF was founded as a specifically Anglican offshoot of Dick Sheppard's secular Peace Pledge Union. APF was formed by Anglican clergy and laity led by Sheppard who were intent on undertaking a torchlit peace march to Lambeth Palace in 1937 as the threat of a Second World War loomed on the horizon. The aim of the march was to give Sheppard's colleague, the then-Archbishop of Canterbury, Cosmo Lang, a statement of pacifist conviction. This was at a time when many churchmen were intent on "trying to reconcile the teachings of Christ with the practice of war".

Besides many priests and bishops, notable early members of the group included British Labour Leader George Lansbury and famous literary figure Vera Brittain. In 2006, songwriter and fellow Anglican Pacifist Fellowship member Sue Gilmurray wrote a song in Brittain's memory, entitled "Vera".

In addition to her famous novels, which were heavily imbued with pacifist ideology, Brittain was very much an active member of the "Ban the Bomber" campaign during the inter-war period, which sought to outlaw bomber aeroplanes as an illegal weapon of war, in recognition of the fact that they directly target civilian populations, beyond the frontline of conflicts and that they carry increasingly deadly payloads. This campaign had parallels to later attempts to ban nuclear weapons and ICBMs.

=== Second World War ===
During the war, "as well as campaigning for peace at every opportunity, APF had a support role for conscientious objectors... Anglican pacifists [also] became involved in social projects as an alternative to military duties".

Lansbury was particularly active in this period, though his life was nearing its end. In contrast to Neville Chamberlain's policy of appeasement, Lansbury took a pro-active diplomatic approach towards preventing a war. He sought negotiation with all the major parties in order to arbitrate a peaceful settlement, as related in his book My Pilgrimage for Peace, published in 1938. His efforts were, however, in vain, and most APF members now acknowledge that, to counteract Hitler by non-violent means, Governments should not have allowed the economic and political situation of instability in the Weimar Republic to arise in the first place. This issue is discussed at depth in APF's 1989 publication, What to Do About Hitler: A Pacifist Symposium. Notably, many early pacifists had argued against the excessively harsh terms of the Treaty of Versailles from its inception.

It is notable that, by 1944, Vera Brittain was on Hitler's list of those English people posing the greatest threat to his regime. The leader of the Reich clearly felt deeply threatened by her pacifism. Upon a successful Nazi invasion of Britain, the Gestapo were to arrest her immediately. Undaunted, she continued writing further tracts on the immorality of saturation bombing, as the British Royal Air Force undertook its campaign against target cities such as Dresden.

Another famous woman to actively work for APF during the war period was the Anglo-Catholic intellectual Evelyn Underhill. Although initially opposed to pacifism (and, in fact, working for Naval Intelligence during World War I), after much soul-searching, she found pacifism to be the correct Christian position by 1939 and threw herself whole-heartedly behind APF's work, for "Not content to be merely a proclaimer of pacifism, Underhill tried to live by its principles".

Writing in a famous pamphlet for APF entitled Church and War (1940), Underhill stated that, "If she remains true to her supernatural call, the Church cannot acquiesce in War for War, however camouflaged or excused, must always mean the effort of a group of men to achieve their purpose... by inflicting destruction and death on another group of men... it is often difficult to define the boundary which divides legitimate police action from military action; nevertheless, Christians must try to find that boundary and to observe it".

During the war, APF supported conscientious objectors, and became involved in social projects to provide an alternative to military duties, including the Hungerford Club, which sheltered Londoners during the Blitz.

=== Historical opposition to nuclear proliferation ===
Some prominent members of APF were at the forefront of resistance to nuclear proliferation. "Canon John Collins from St. Paul's Cathedral was in the forefront of the founding leadership of the Campaign for Nuclear Disarmament (CND). The Revd. Sidney Hinkes was an early Chairman of CND".

Hinkes' "theology was conservatively Catholic in what he regarded as essentials, yet his parochial and pastoral practice was radically open, both to the working-class culture and the ethnic diversity of the people in the areas in which he served".

Hinkes was a leading member of APF during his lifetime, known for leading peace rallies and prayer vigils with his distinctive, large-sized version of the APF's emblematic blue and gold cross. He worked with the then-President of the Fellowship, Gordon Wilson and APF counsellor Paul Oestreicher on many strident campaigns for peace, his motto being "we put the 'fist' into pacifist!"

This stance exemplified the proactive peacemaking stance and pacifism of APF and contrasted sharply with any accusations of "passivism." "To Sidney, peacemaking was anything but passive. His priesthood was a total commitment to the non-violent struggle to implement God's just and gentle rule. It was tough and demanding, but never embittered".

Frustrated that the Church often saw peace-making as a marginal issue, Hinkes worked to ensure that it came to central prominence due to his diligent work on race-relations as Britain became more ethnically-diverse following the War. Up until his death, he worked for both APF and the Stop the War Coalition to proactively pursue peace and an end to the 2003 Iraq War.

Oestreicher, an honorary doctor from the University of Sussex, fled Nazi Germany as a child refugee. He grew up in New Zealand and was for many years director of the Centre for International Reconciliation at Coventry Cathedral. Like many APF members, he also works for other peace organisations. In his case, he has worked for the Campaign for Nuclear Disarmament and was also the founding chair for Amnesty International. Though an Anglican priest, also holds a strong affinity for the Quaker religion.

He continues to write columns for The Guardian newspaper and occasionally returns to New Zealand to speak on peace issues.

== Current Activities ==
=== United Kingdom ===
==== Church reform ====
APF campaigns prominently at each Lambeth Conference. This activism aims to make the Church uphold Resolution 25 of the 1930 Lambeth Conference and Resolution 5 from the 1978 Lambeth Conference that state that "war as a method of settling international disputes is incompatible with the teaching and example of our Lord Jesus Christ". This Resolution overrules the older Article 37 of the 39 Articles of Anglican faith, which had stated that "It is lawful for Christian men at the commandment of the Magistrate to wear weapons and serve in the wars". Making Bishops take practical steps to proclaim and uphold this Resolution is a key aim of APF.

The 1968 Lambeth Conference saw a victory for conscientious objectors who finally had their rights recognised and upheld by the Church. The use of nuclear and bacteriological weapons was also "emphatically condemned". "Gordon Wilson of APF was pleased that there were no ‘but’s in the Conference’s anti-war statements".

During the 1978 Conference, after a pilgrimage to Dick Sheppard's grave, activists nailed Seven Theses to the door of Canterbury Cathedral. "The theses reflected the theological approach of Gordon Wilson for whom Christ’s victory of love over violence on the cross was a fundamental principle". This action deliberately echoed Martin Luther's famous nailing of The Ninety-Five Theses to the church door in Wittenberg.

Much time is also spent lobbying bishops and politicians and promoting the pacifist viewpoint in public forum debates and on representational committees.

==== Prayer ====
In 1974, APF founded the Week of Prayer for World Peace, and continue to have close ties with it, now that it has expanded to become an inter-religious event.

==== White poppies ====
APF is also heavily involved in the Greenbelt Festival and White Poppy sales for protesting Remembrance Day, which APF members feel has become too much a celebration of the military.

==== Support for conscientious objectors ====
Songwriter Sue Gilmurray, an APF member, is heavily involved in commemorations surrounding International Conscientious Objectors Day, held annually on May 15 at Tavistock Square in London,

Gilmurray is one of a number of APF members who showed support for the Baptist peace activist and human shield, Norman Kember.

==== Faslane protests ====
Gilmurray is also prominent in protests against the Faslane Naval Base, at which Trident Nuclear Weapons are situated.

==== Opposition to the arms trade ====
Several prominent APF members, such as Gilmurray and scientist Dr Tony Kempster are also involved in the secular Movement for the Abolition of War. Kempster has been a strident opponent of the weapons manufacturer, BAE. Indeed, BAE considered Kempster such a threat that it infiltrated MAW and stole a membership database. Legal action against the arms manufacturer was pursued.

==== Child soldiers ====
In 2009, the Fellowship supported Red Hand Day, to raise awareness of the plight of child soldiers in African conflicts.

==== Peace education ====
APF also supports peace museums with Clive Barrett being particularly involved in this type of education and awareness campaigning. APF also sponsors the Peace and Faith project at the Peace Museum in Bradford.

Elnora Ferguson also lead peace education in the British education system.

The Fellowship focuses very much on the promotion of Peace Studies in British schools to counter attempts by the military to recruit English school students. APF promotes the use of Peace Education Network materials in school assemblies.

In 2017, APF created a new travelling exhibition for British cathedrals, “Faith and Peace”, looking at the three Abrahamic faiths, using textiles created by women in Bradford.

==== Publication ====
To further peace education, the organisation also published The Anglican Peacemaker on a quarterly basis.

==== Peace award ====
APF also helps to facilitate individuals to take action for peace. It sponsors the Wilson/Hinkes Peace Award for grass-roots peacemaking.

=== New Zealand ===
APF branches exist in all British Commonwealth countries but the Fellowship is particularly prominent in New Zealand. The New Zealand Chapter was initially established in Christchurch in 1948. The New Zealand Chapter has its own website and newsletter and count a number of local bishops amongst its membership.

The prominence of the New Zealand branch was helped significantly by Sidney Hinkes' pilgrimages to that country during the branch's formative stages. The New Zealand Chapter was headed by an Anglo-Catholic, Professor Margaret Bedggood, and Chris Barfoot throughout 2008. The previous head of the Chapter in this country had been Roger Baker. As of 2018, the head of the New Zealand chapter was Jonathan Harfield.

Bedggood, an Anglo-Catholic Franciscan Professor of Law and was the Chief Commissioner of the New Zealand Human Rights Commission, a member of Amnesty International and a member of the New Zealand Film and Literature Review Board.

The current Chair of the New Zealand Chapter is Dr Jonathan Hartfield.

The New Zealand Chapter supports the Aotearoa New Zealand Campaign to Stop Killer Robots, the Global Day of Action on Military Spending and iCAN Aotearoa New Zealand (International Campaign to Abolish Nuclear Weapons).

=== Australia ===
==== Anglo-Catholics and liberals ====
In contrast to New Zealand, APF has a much more low-key presence in Australia. The most notable member of the organisation in this country was Margaret Holmes, a lifelong peace activist, prominent in many anti-war organisations, notably the Women's International League for Peace and Freedom. She was a member of the congregation at the Anglo-Catholic parish of Saint Luke's in Mosman. Author Michelle Cavanagh published a readily-available biography of Holmes in 2006. Holmes died on September 10, 2009, at the age of 100.

For many years, the secretary of APF in Australia was an English-born Anglo-Catholic clergyman, David Thawley (sometime Dean of Wangaratta), a Second World War conscientious objector who was proactive in promoting the organisation and working on various committees within the Church and alongside secular anti-war organisations. He died in 2010. According to his obituary, he graduated from school in World War Two and "registered as a conscientious objector, although as an ordinand he was not bound to register - but felt morally obliged to do so. His sincerity was accepted by the tribunal, and after a year of theology at Oxford he joined the Friends' Ambulance Unit as a driver - at first in England, and from 1945-47 in China."

Thawley then became a leading churchman and theology lecturer in Brisbane, teaching "biblical, patristic and other subjects". After working at the Cathedral and a girls' school for a long time, he was responsible for a large parish where he found fulfillment as a "mentor of many from all generations, especially the young."

Thawley and his wife later retired in Melbourne. Both were intellectuals, "widely read and deeply understanding of human nature, they combined in their personalities - he quiet, she effervescent - something of Bloomsbury [intellectually if not morally] and a kind of very English Christianity such as flowered in the patient goodness of Chaucer's parson." One of his sons served as an Australian ambassador to the United States.

Thawley's successor as the Secretary of the Australian Chapter was Philip Huggins, an Anglo-Catholic bishop from Melbourne in Victoria. An ecumenist, Bishop Huggins has also served as the president of the National Council of Churches in Australia and is a member of the Palestine-Israel Ecumenical Network (PIEN), the Australian Intercultural Society and is co-Chair of Christian World Service Commission (ACT for Peace). He is also the chairman of Anglicare. He is a liberal Anglo-Catholic and was previously an Assistant Bishop of Perth and then Bishop of Grafton, two of the most liberal dioceses in Australia.

Bishop Huggins has spoken out in defence of African immigrants to Australia on multiple occasions.

As a Christian pacifist, Bishop Huggins is also opposed to voluntary euthanasia as it violates "the sanctity of life as God's gift." He proposed a motion in the 2010 Anglican national synod that affirmed, "Our task is to protect, nurture and sustain life to the best of our ability."

A former Australian Labor Party political candidate, President of the National Council of Churches, and Director of the Centre for Ecumenical Studies in 2019, Bishop Higgins was appointed APF Counsellor.

==== Evangelicals and conservatives ====
Another lay member of APF in Australia was David Le Sage. A life-long, deeply devout Christian and conservative Calvinist from a very old French Huguenot family, David Le Sage originally attended Saint Paul's Glenorchy in Tasmania, which had a very low church/Calvinist ethos. He became interested in Christian pacifism in the 1990s. He initially organised fundraisers for African refugees and was involved in some low-key anti-military protest activities.

At university, David Le Sage undertook post-graduate academic research on the pacifist ideology of various 1930s writers. A published author, from January 2009 he led peace education in a teaching role at a private Christian school in Brisbane. He later worked as a technical writer for one of the world's leading software companies for many years.

David Le Sage had an affinity for the pacifist strain of conservative Calvinist thinking exemplified by André Trocmé and Jean Lasserre. He had a deep interest in various other Calvinist and Lutheran pacifist thinkers, too. He also studied the writing of the British conservative evangelical anti-military thinker, Nick Megoran, author of Warlike Christians in an Age of Violence and the Early Church's pacifist writings.

David Le Sage was an opponent of the extremely liberal theology promoted by the Anglican Diocese of Brisbane. He was staunchly opposed to homosexual- and women pastors for theological reasons. He was a conservative Christian antifeminist and believed in traditional gender roles for women. He later attended a Lutheran church in Brisbane.

After working for a Christian charity for a brief time, David Le Sage became a successful freelance editor.

Another leading member of the APF with a background in the evangelical/low church Anglican Diocese of Tasmania is Nathanael Reuss, who served as the worldwide chairman of APF from 2012 until the end of 2017. Born in rural Victoria, he grew up in an Anglo-Catholic household before becoming a low church Anglican. Unlike David Le Sage who was a traditional conservative Calvinistic Protestant, Nathanael Reuss has Pentecostal/charismatic leanings

Training as a scientist before becoming a clergyman, Reuss worked for a long time in Tasmania as an assistant priest at the evangelical parish of Saint John's in Launceston and also performed duties as a hospital chaplain in that city. He then undertook postgraduate studies in Nottingham. His Master's thesis was on the topic, “Is Jesus’ subversion of the messianic military expectations a sufficient basis for a normative Christian non-violent ethic?”

In 2017, Reuss became the rector of the Onkaparinga Valley Parish in South Australia. He is now the Lecturer in Practical Theology at Saint Barnabas' Theological College in South Australia.

=== Israel ===
George Appleton, the former Anglican Archbishop of Jerusalem, was an APF member.

=== Uganda ===
APF member Bishop Nelson Onono Onweng of the Diocese of Northern Uganda has helped to facilitate peace talks with rebel militia leaders and directly faced the problems of dealing with the Lord's Resistance Army and their kidnapping of youth to pressgang them into becoming child soldiers.

=== Zimbabwe ===
In Zimbabwe, APF set up peace clubs in schools and youth centres to promote non-violence to settle disagreements before the 2018 general elections.

=== Somalia ===
APF supports conscientious objectors in places where mandatory military service still exists. One of these places is Somalia. Many Somalian refugees are men and women who refused to do military service.

=== Kenya ===
APF has established ongoing “peace footballs” for youth groups in Kenya.

=== South Sudan ===
APF has provided a grant to train pastors to facilitate reconciliation work amongst South Sudanese refugees in Ethiopia.

APF's 2018 chairwoman, Sue Claydon, has also worked directly as a volunteer in South Sudan.

=== Sri Lanka ===
Pararasan Arulanantham, originally from Sri Lanka, has helped to promote peace in that country.

=== Work with other groups ===
The American branch of APF is known as the Episcopal Peace Fellowship. The Fellowship is a member body of the Peace Education Network, Network of Christian Peace Organisations, War Resisters International and of the International Peace Bureau. Indeed, Roberta Bacic, a survivor of the Pinochet regime in Chile and President of WRI, has worked closely with Fellowship members and written for the APF newsletter.

APF closely with Christian Campaign for Nuclear Disarmament, and has applied to join the Community of the Cross of Nails at Coventry.

APF also works with Roman Catholic peace organisation, Pax Christi.

== Publications and resources ==
The Fellowship publishes a newsletter, The Anglican Peacemaker, which is available online or via mail subscription. Each newsletter explores a specific theme or current event and also contains a page depicting art, song lyrics and poetry that promote a culture of peace. Book and film reviews are also featured. The newsletter explores pragmatic constructive ways of building peace as well as exploring the Christian spiritual foundations of pacifism. It frequently critiques the actions of the military and arms manufacturers in many parts of the world and explores the reasons for the military still having such influence in society. The role of the media, environment, politics and capitalism are explored, and ways of educating people about the immorality of military life are also discussed. Promotion of proactive peace-making and analysis of the causes of war and attraction of the military are key aims of the newsletter.

APF also publishes a range of leaflets on a variety of topics from traditional Anglican pacifist tracts and an explanation of the Church's teachings on pacifism to articles discussing pragmatic pacifist responses to the problem of Hitler and alternatives to warfare. Pamphlets analyse the Bible in detail, with particular reference to the Sermon on the Mount and the teachings and actions of Jesus Christ to show pacifism as the most Christian response to warfare, such as how Jesus, through disarming Saint Peter in the Garden of Gethsemane, thereby "disarms every soldier". It also depicts the pacifist attitude of believers in the Early Church, prior to Christianity's acceptance by Constantine. Many of the educational pamphlets were written by Derek Savage, a prominent British poet, APF member and Second World War conscientious objector.

One of Savage's tracts, Pacifism, Church and State, discusses one of the unique problems facing the Anglican Communion. As a State Church in England, the Anglican Church is often seen as part of "The Establishment" and thus critiquing Government policy and fully realizing the subversive, radical politics and social message at the heart of Jesus' Gospel can be difficult. The Church can thus be criticised for excessive compliance to the Government and not living up to Christ's ideals as expressed in the Sermon on the Mount in which he criticises the power structures of this world, including the dominant military and economic force of His own time, the Roman Empire.

A topic often discussed amongst pacifists is that of how best they could respond to the emergence of Hitler by using nonviolent means. Most APF members feel that the problem of Hitler could have been settled earlier peacefully only prior to 1939 via a more just and equitable Treaty of Versailles and more work to promote a stable economic and political situation in the Weimar Republic, as is related in the pamphlet What to Do About Hitler: A Pacifist Symposium, published in 1989. The pamphlet also notes that the Jews suffered horrific persecution under the Nazis during the 1930s, but the Final Solution could occur onlynunder the cloud of wartime activity. Those who argue against fighting Hitler also note that the bombing of Dresden, Hiroshima and Nagasaki meant that the Allies sunk to the level of their opponents, and a campaign of nonviolent resistance to any Nazi regime may have been more effective as such an overstretched empire would not be sustainable in the long run. The pamphlet argues that if Germany had been treated with greater dignity and been helped to recover more quickly after its 1918 defeat, the conditions that led Hitler to rise to power would not have occurred. Hence, the Fellowship aims to work proactively in the world to determine and eliminate causes of warfare before conflict becomes inevitable.

Other notable tracts include:

- Why I am Not a Pacifist: A Pacifist's Reply, which addresses some of the key theological and pragmatic questions often asked by people hesitant to embrace pacifism;
- Article XXXVII and War, which discusses the contentious Article and its bearing on modern Anglican pacifism;
- Against the Stream, about the life of the German Roman Catholic conscientious objector Franz Jägerstätter, who was executed for refusing to serve in the Nazi army;
- The Church and War, a classic 1940 tract by Evelyn Underhill

Combined, the texts explore many of the issues surrounding a pacifism and intellectually engage the spiritual and pragmatic consequences of the ideology.

In 2000, the Fellowship released a compact disc of music, entitled Finest Hour, featuring music composed by Gilmurray, the renowned Anglican hymn writer Christopher Idle and John Bell of the Iona Community. The songs on the album promote pacifism and Christian fellowship by critiquing a number of issues and themes relating to war, arms manufacturing, American imperialism and corporate capitalism.

A second recording by Gilmurray, The Way of Peace, was released in 2006 to recognise the United Nations' Decade for the Promotion of a Culture of Peace and Non-Violence for the Children of the World. It was accompanied by a Lenten study book that contains poetry and passages of scripture. The album featured songs critiquing social issues such as the use of child soldiers in African combat zones and the depictions of violence in films and other media products marketed towards children.

== See also ==
- Vera Brittain (1893–1970), English literary figure and APF member.
- John Collins (1905–1982), Clergyman, APF member, CND co-founder and anti-apartheid activist.
- Sidney Hinkes (1925–2006), Priest and APF activist.
- Margaret Holmes (1909–2009), Australia's most prominent APF activist.
- George Lansbury (1859–1940), Former British Labour Party Leader and APF Chairman
- Derek Savage (1917–2007), Former APF General Secretary.
- Colin Scott (1933-) Former APF Chairman and Anglican bishop
- Dick Sheppard (1880–1937), Anglican priest, pioneer religious broadcaster and founder of the Peace Pledge Union and the Anglican Pacifist Fellowship
- Evelyn Underhill (1875–1941), Anglican thinker and APF member.
- Gordon Wilson (1927–1995) Former APF Chairman
- Anglicanism
- Campaign for Nuclear Disarmament
- Christian pacifism
- Conscientious objector
- Fellowship of Reconciliation
- Lambeth Conference
- List of anti-war organizations
- List of peace activists
- Lutheran Peace Fellowship
- Pacifism
- Pacifist organisation
- Pax Christi
- Peace Churches
- Presbyterian Peace Fellowship
- War Resisters' International
