= List of anti-war organizations =

In order to facilitate organized, determined, and principled opposition to the wars, people have often founded anti-war organizations. These groups range from temporary coalitions which address one war or pending war, to more permanent structured organizations which work to end the concept of war and the factors which lead to large-scale destructive conflicts. The overwhelming majority do so in a nonviolent manner and can be considered track II diplomacy. The following list of anti-war organizations highlights past and present anti-war groups from around the world.

== International ==
- Beyond War
- Campaign for Nuclear Disarmament
- Cluster Munition Coalition
- Community Peacemaker Teams
- Dartmouth Conferences
- Hands Off the People of Iran
- Institute for Economics & Peace
- †International Campaign Against Aggression on Iraq
- International Campaign to Abolish Nuclear Weapons
- International Campaign to Ban Landmines
- International Coalition to Ban Uranium Weapons
- International Committee for Robot Arms Control
- International Fellowship of Reconciliation
- International Peace Bureau
- International Physicians for the Prevention of Nuclear War
- †Mondpaca Esperantista Movado World Peace Esperanto Movement
- Nobel Women's Initiative organized by female Nobel Peace Prize winners
- Nonviolent Peaceforce
- Peace One Day
- Peace Brigades International
- Peace Pledge Union
- Pugwash Conferences on Science and World Affairs
- Service Civil International
- Students for Justice in Palestine
- The Non-Violence Project
- War Resisters' International
- Women's International League for Peace and Freedom
- World Constitution and Parliament Association
- †World Constitution Coordinating Committee
- World March for Peace and Nonviolence
- World Beyond War
- World Peace Council
- †World Congress of Intellectuals for Peace

== Africa ==
- Anti-War Coalition
- Committee on South African War Resistance
- †End Conscription Campaign
- Koeberg Alert

== Asia ==
- Alliance for Middle East Peace
- †Beheiren - Japan

=== Iran ===
- National Council for Peace

=== Israel and Palestine ===
- A Land for All - Israel
- B’Tselem - Israel
- Breaking the Silence - Israel
- Coalition of Women for Peace
- Combatants for Peace - Israel
- Gush Shalom - Israel
- The Harry S. Truman Research Institute for the Advancement of Peace
- Machsom Watch - Israel
- Mesarvot - Israel
- Minds of Peace - Israel and Palestine
- Ometz LeSarev
- Parents Circle - Israel and Palestine
- Partners for Progressive Israel - Israel
- Peace Now - Israel
- Peres Center for Peace - Israel
- Religious Peace Initiative - Israel
- Standing Together - Israel
- The People's Voice - Israel
- Women in Black
- Women of the Sun - Palestine
- Woman Wage Peace - Israel
- Yesh Din - Israel and Palestine
- Yesh Gvul - Israel
- Youth Against Dictatorship - Israel

== Central America ==
- Arias Foundation for Peace and Human Progress (Spanish: Fundación Arias para la Paz y el Progreso Humano) - Costa Rica

== Europe ==
- Czech National Social Party – Austria-Hungary, main anti-militarist party during the World War in 1914–1918
- †Dansk Fredsforening, Danske Kvinders Fredskæde – Denmark
- †International League of Peace
- †League of Peace and Freedom
- †Soviet Peace Committee – state-controlled organization during the Soviet Union
- †Stop the War Committee – opposed the Second Boer war

=== Germany ===
- German Peace Society

=== France ===
- Movement for a Non-violent Alternative (in French)
- †Peace Through Law Association
- Union pacifiste de France (in French)
- †Groupe d'action et de résistance à la militarisation (in French)
- †Mouvement pour le désarmement, la paix et la liberté (in French)

=== Italy ===
- Society for Pace and International Justice (italian: Società per la pace e la giustizia internazionale)

=== Belgium ===
- VOS - Vlaamse Vredesvereniging – Flemish Peace Association, created in the trenches of Flanders during the Great War

=== Norway ===
- Norwegian Peace Association (Norwegian: Norges Fredslag)

=== Sweden ===
- Swedish Peace and Arbitration Society

=== United Kingdom ===
- Campaign for Nuclear Disarmament
- †Committee of 100
- †Direct Action Committee
- International Voluntary Service
- Military Families Against the War
- †No-Conscription Fellowship
- Peace Pledge Union
- †Peace Society
- Stop the War Coalition
- †Spies for Peace

== North America ==
=== United States ===
- About Face (formerly Iraq Veterans Against the War)
- †America First Committee – opposed American entry into the Second World War
- †American League Against War and Fascism
- †American Peace Mobilization
- †American Peace Society
- †American Writers Against the Vietnam War
- A.N.S.W.E.R. (also known as International ANSWER and ANSWER Coalition)
- Another Mother For Peace
- Anti-War Committee
- Antiwar.com
- †Buffalo Nine
- Campus Antiwar Network
- Committee for Non-Violent Action (later merged with the War Resisters League)
- †Committee for Nonviolent Revolution
- Center on Conscience & War (formerly known as NISBCO)
- †Central Committee for Conscientious Objectors
- Chicago Coalition Against War & Racism
- Council for a Livable World
- Council for the National Interest
- Code Pink: Women for Peace
- Common Dreams
- †Direct Action to Stop the War
- Friends Committee on National Legislation
- Gay Liberation Network
- GI Rights Network
- Gold Star Families for Peace
- Grandmothers for Peace
- Iraq Peace Action Coalition
- LewRockwell.com
- Long Island Alliance for Peaceful Alternatives
- Military Families Speak Out opposed to war in Iraq
- Mennonite Central Committee
- †Moratorium to End the War in Vietnam
- National Campaign for a Peace Tax Fund
- †National Coordinating Committee to End the War in Vietnam
- †National Mobilization Committee to End the War in Vietnam
- National War Tax Resistance Coordinating Committee
- †New York Peace Society – first peace society in U.S., opposed 19th and 20th century wars
- †No Conscription League
- †Not in Our Name
- †Orange County Student Alliance
- Peace Action
- Peace Alliance
- Peace and Freedom Party
- †People's Coalition for Peace and Justice
- †People's Council of America for Democracy and Peace – anti-World War I group
- Port Militarization Resistance
- Quincy Institute for Responsible Statecraft
- RESIST
- Ron Paul Institute for Peace and Prosperity
- †Seneca Women's Encampment for a Future of Peace and Justice
- September Eleventh Families for Peaceful Tomorrows
- †Spring Mobilization Committee to End the War in Vietnam
- Students for a Democratic Society (2006 organization)
- The World Can't Wait
- Troops Out Now Coalition
- United for Peace and Justice
- Veterans for Peace
- †Vietnam Day Committee
- Vietnam Veterans Against the War
- War Resisters League
- Win Without War
- †Women's Peace Party
- †Women's Peace Society
- †Women's Peace Union
- Writers Against the War on Gaza
- †Youth International Party (Yippies)

=== Canada ===
- †American Deserters Committee
- †Canadian Peace Alliance
- Canadian Peace Congress
- †Ceasefire Canada
- Nova Scotia Voice of Women
- War Resisters Support Campaign

=== Mexico ===
- Movement for Peace with Justice and Dignity (spanish: Movimiento por la Paz con Justicia y Dignidad)

== Oceania ==
- Peace Action Wellington
- Stop the War Coalition

== Religious ==
=== Christian ===
- American Friends Service Committee
- Anglican Pacifist Fellowship
- Catholic Association for International Peace
- Catholic Worker Movement
- Christian Peace Conference
- Episcopal Peace Fellowship
- Fellowship of Reconciliation
- Friends Committee on National Legislation
- Lutheran Peace Fellowship
- Mennonite Central Committee
- Methodist Peace Fellowship
- Order of Maximilian – anti-Vietnam war organization
- Pax Christi
- Pentecostals & Charismatics for Peace & Justice
- Presbyterian Peace Fellowship

=== Buddhist ===
- Buddhist Peace Fellowship

=== Jewish ===
- Jewish Voice for Peace

== See also ==
- List of peace activists
- Anti-nuclear organizations
- Anti-war movement
- Direct action
- Gandhi Peace Award
- Gandhi Peace Prize
- GI Coffeehouses
- GI Underground Press
- Global Peace Index
- Nobel Peace Prize laureates
- Non-interventionism
- Nonviolence
- Nonviolent resistance
- Nuclear disarmament
- Pacifism
- Parliament Square Peace Campaign
- Peace
- Peace churches
- Resistance movement
- White House Peace Vigil
- World peace
