= List of pacifist organisations =

A Pacifist organisation promotes the pacifist principle of renouncing war and violence for political ends. They are distinguished from organisations concerned only with removing nuclear weapons from war, though those organisations may call for suspension of hostilities as well. Other organisations include those that deal with other concerns, but have a strong pacifist element.

Pacifist organisations:

- American Friends Service Committee
- Anglican Pacifist Fellowship
- Boycott, Divestment and Sanctions
- Buddhist Peace Fellowship
- Central Committee for Conscientious Objectors
- Centre for Nonviolent Action
- Christian Peacemaker Teams
- Community Peacemaker Teams
- ECOPEACE Party
- Evangelical People's Party (Netherlands)
- Fellowship of Reconciliation
- Fellowship Party
- Japan Socialist Party
- Mennonites
- New Socialist Party of Japan
- No-Conscription Fellowship
- Nonviolence International
- Nonviolent Peaceforce
- No More War Movement
- Pacifist Socialist Party
- Peace Brigades International
- Peace commission
- Peace News
- Peace Party (UK)
- Peace Pledge Union
- International Peace Society
- React, Include, Recycle
- Religious Society of Friends (Quakers)
- Social Democratic Party (Japan)
- Syrian Nonviolence Movement
- The Eco-pacifist Greens
- Unity (Swedish political party)
- War Resisters' International
- War Resisters League
- Women's International League for Peace and Freedom
- Women's Peace Union

"Nuclear pacifist" organisations:

- CND
- Pugwash

Organisations that cite pacifism as an aim:

- Greenpeace

== See also ==
- Anarcho-pacifism
- Antimilitarism
- Anti-war movement
- Catholic peace traditions
- Christian pacifism
- Christian Peace Conference
- Counter-recruitment
- Jewish Peace Fellowship
- Modern-war pacifism
- Mother's Day Proclamation
- Nonviolence
- Nonviolent resistance
- Pacifism in Islam
- Peace churches
- Peace journalism
- Soldiers are murderers
- World March for Peace and Nonviolence
