= Action AWE =

British anti-nuclear weapons group

Action AWE (Action Atomic Weapons Eradication) is a grassroots activist anti-nuclear weapons campaign/group launched in February 2013. Its aim is to increase and activate public opposition to the UK Trident nuclear weapons system, and depleted uranium warheads manufactured at AWE Burghfield (where AWE stands for Atomic Weapons Establishment), along with AWE Aldermaston.

The group has been involved in numerous non-violent "disarmament" direct actions, both under its own banner and in association with other groups.

The group has attracted media attention.

== Basis for Action ==
The foundation of Action AWE's various disarmament actions is the 1996 Advisory Opinion of the International Court of Justice, Legality of the Threat or Use of Nuclear Weapons, in which it found that 'the threat or use of nuclear weapons would generally be contrary to the rules of international law applicable in armed conflict'. In addition to this, activists also argue that since the British government is not actively negotiating nuclear disarmament and is actively considering upgrading the UK Trident programme, it is in violation of the Non-Proliferation Treaty of 1968.

There is dissent to the continuation of the Trident programme from within the government as well as from without.

== Actions and Protests ==
The launch event in February 2012 was a public meeting and a banner hang, timed to coincide with a parliamentary meeting on defence spending.

From the 26 August to the 2 September 2013, Action AWE camped beside AWE Burghfield for solidarity, research, training, the sharing of information and to support activists blockading and researching in the area. Traffic was surveyed and monitored with data compiled for Nukewatch.

On a Blockade Day on Monday the 2 September, there were 21 arrests and at various times throughout the day all four gates to the establishment were blockaded by activists.

On the 6 September a more light-hearted "nearly nude" protest was well covered in the Reading Post.

In August 2014, in association with Wool Against Weapons, Action AWE activists laid 7 miles of pink scarf between AWE Burghfield and AWE Aldermasrston. This was knitted by hundreds of people all over the country, sharing the anti-nuclear-weapons sentiment.

There is an ongoing, regular vigil on the first Tuesday of every month, at AWE Aldermaston.

== See also ==
- Anti-nuclear movement in the United Kingdom
- Trident Ploughshares
- International Campaign to Abolish Nuclear Weapons
- Christian CND
- War Resisters' International
