= Mario Rodríguez Cobos =

Argentine writer and philosopher (1938–2010)

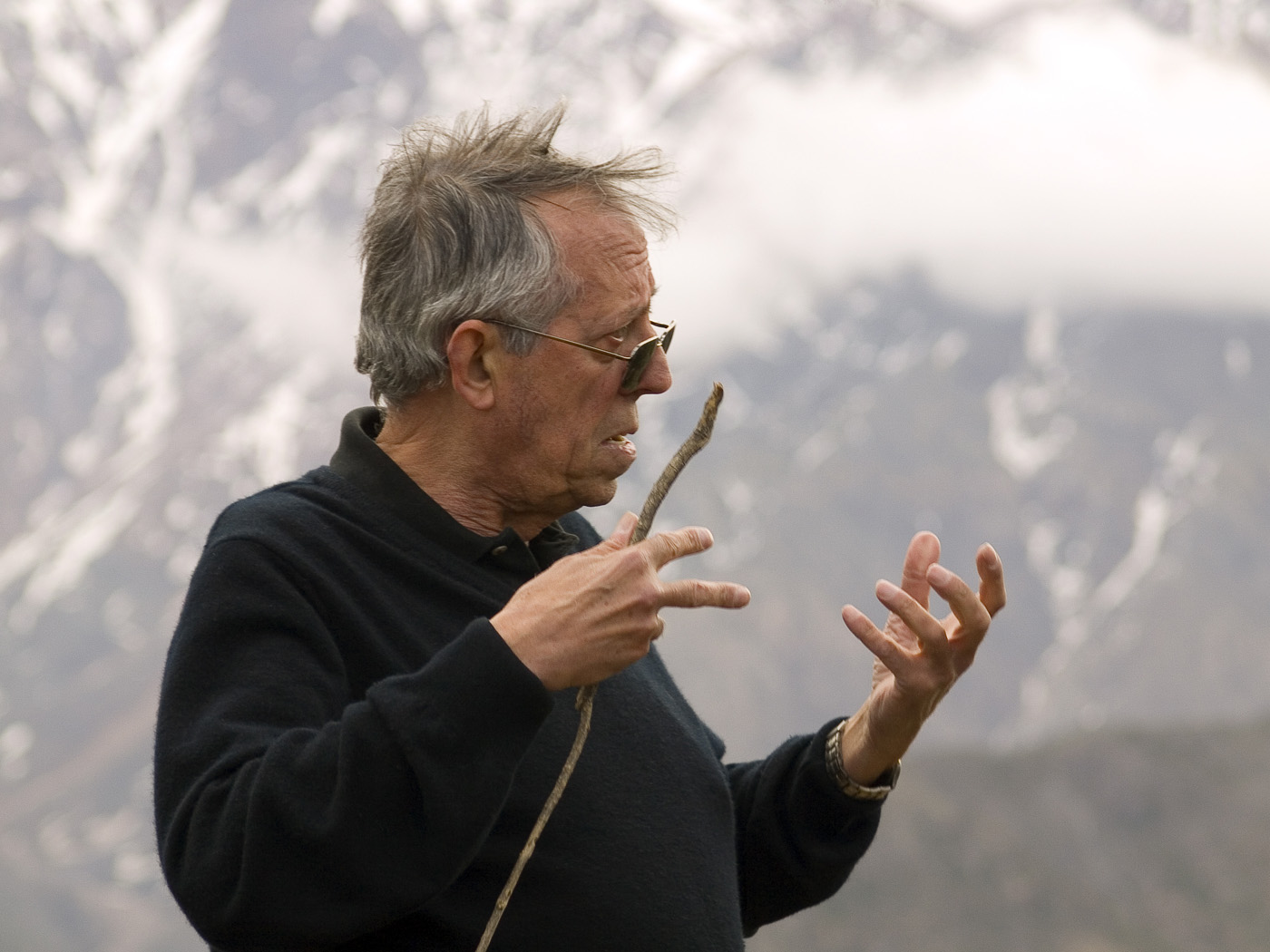
- Rodríguez Cobos in 2007
- Born: Mario Luis Rodríguez Cobos; 6 January 1938; Mendoza, Argentina
- Died: 16 September 2010 (aged 72); Mendoza, Argentina
- Other names: Silo
- Occupation(s): Writer, philosopher
- Known for: Founder of the Humanist Movement
- Spouse: Ana Luisa Cremaschi
- Children: 2
- Website: http://www.silo.net

Mario Luis Rodríguez Cobos (6 January 1938 – 16 September 2010), (Note: On the Humanist Movement's websites, he frequently appears with the name "Mario Luis Rodríguez Cobos", although his DNI (Argentine identity document) reads "Mario Luis Rodríguez", since in Argentina the maternal surname is not used.) also known by the mononym Silo, was an Argentine writer and founder of the international volunteer organisation Humanist Movement.

As an active speaker, he authored books, short stories, articles, and studies on topics ranging from politics and society to psychology and spirituality. Despite his self-description as a writer, many regard him as a thinker and philosopher due to the wide array of subjects he addressed in his works.

== Biography ==
Silo was born into a middle-class family of Spanish origin in Mendoza, Argentina. His father was winemaker Rafael Rodriguez (from Granada) and his mother Maria Luisa Cobos, a Basque and a music teacher. He was the youngest of three children, with two older siblings in Raquel and Guillermo. He undertook primary and secondary education with the Maristas Brotherhood, achieving excellent grades, while practising gymnastics and specializing in the pommel horse and reaching high positions in the regional rankings. In addition, he was involved in various youth organizations and lead a very active social and intellectual life. He carried out special studies, in languages including French and Italian, and philosophy. He also published articles in cultural magazines.

Silo studied law for three years at the National University of Córdoba, and later returned to his home town to continue his studies in this field at the National University of Cuyo. At university he began to organize research groups on human beings and their existential and social problems.

Silo travelled around Argentina, South America and Europe and undertook various jobs. By 1960 – following "a rearrangement of his inner truths" as a newspaper slogan of the time reported – he began to present his proposals, while still forming study groups in Argentina and Chile. With members of these groups he organized a public talk, which was initially banned by the military government but later was permitted in the mountains, away from the centres of population. The military dictatorships which subsequently beset the country were present throughout the life of Silo with successive arrests and detentions.

So, on 4 May 1969, Silo spoke to some two hundred people gathered in Punta de Vacas (Province of Mendoza), in the high Andes mountains near Mount Aconcagua, and gave his first public exposition of the ideas, that in time, would form the basis of the Humanist Movement. In this talk, known as "The Healing of Suffering", he explained themes such as the overcoming of pain and suffering, the meaning of life, violence, desire and pleasure.

Silo married Ana Luisa Cremaschi, whom he knew from his youth, and had two sons, Alejandro and Federico, with whom he lived in his hometown.

In 1972 he published The Inner Look and the initial groups extended to other countries, partly because the military dictatorships provoked the exile of many of the participants. In the early 70's, Silo created the current of thought now known as New Humanism or Universalist Humanism, and founded the Humanist Movement, an organized group that sought to translate this thought into practice. It can be said that this thinking encompasses the whole of human existence, not only social but also personal.

Since the eighties, and under his orientation, the Humanist Movement began a period of expansion in the world with the creation of organisms and fronts of action: the Humanist Party with a presence in more than 30 countries, The Community for Human Development (a cultural association), Convergence of Cultures (a civil association), World Without Wars (an anti-armament association) and the World Centre of Humanist Studies.

During 1981 he was invited to express his proposals in various public rallies in European and Asian cities, visiting Madrid, Rome, Barcelona, and later Mumbai (India) and Colombo (Sri Lanka), before returning to Paris, and later San Francisco (California) and Mexico City. He explained with particular force the position of nonviolence, manifested in the overcoming of suffering, the human treatment of others and the attitude of not searching for those to blame. Aspects of these talks relevant to his thought were published in the bookSilo Speaks.

On 6 October 1993 in Moscow, Silo was awarded a doctorate honoris causa by the Institute of Latin American Studies of the Academy of Sciences of the Soviet Union. In this ceremony, he supported his ideas on "conditions of dialogue," concluding his presentation with these words: "We will see no full dialogue on the fundamental questions of today’s civilization until we, as a society, begin to lose our belief in the innumerable illusions fed by the enticements of the current system. In the meantime, the dialogue will continue to be insubstantial and without any connection to the profound motivations of society. However, in some latitudes of the world something new has begun to move, something that, beginning in a dialogue of specialists, will slowly begin to move into the public arena."

=== Later years ===
In early 2002, Silo announced his retirement from the Humanist Movement, after being its driving force for 32 years. He did it by moving the orientation of the Humanist Movement to an assembly composed of the general coordinators of the movement. By August 2007 there were about 400 members in this assembly.

In mid-2002 he launched Silo's Message understood as a book, an experience and a path. Among his more recent projects he gave impetus to the construction of complexes known as Parks of Study and Reflection in Argentina, Chile, Spain, USA, Italy, India and Egypt, among other geographical locations. The money to build these parks was gathered from voluntary donations.

During the first decade of the 21st century he returned to speak at Punta de Vacas on several occasions with proposals of reconciliation, access to the profound and the sacred of human being, accepting invitations to speak about his Message and going to more humble places, like family homes, or small halls (salitas) in the same neighbourhood of Mendoza, and in greater Buenos Aires, Santiago de Chile and Quito (Ecuador). He also attended events organized in Lisbon, Rome, northern Italy and elsewhere. Furthermore, as well as organising Halls of the Message and Parks of Study and Reflection around his works, Silo attended various opening ceremonies in places such as in La Reja (Buenos Aires), Las Manantiales (Santiago de Chile), Carcarañá (Rosario, Argentina), Toledo (Spain), Attigliano (Rome, Italy), etc.

One of his last public addresses was made in Berlin at the Summit of Nobel Peace Laureates, on 11 November 2009, during the passage through that city of the "World March for Peace and Nonviolence". On this occasion Silo called for global nuclear disarmament as the main urgency of the moment.

His last years were spent in Chacras de Coria, a town on the outskirts of the city of Mendoza. He died at his home on 16 September 2010, after suffering for more than a year with renal disease.

His figure, until his death, was highly controversial, since he was considered a "spiritual guide" by his followers, while his critics labeled him a cult leader. He referred to himself as a writer and practitioner of what he called an "inner religion".

There exist few interviews and reports in the media on the life of Silo, however, the most numerous were carried out in Chile in the early nineties (with the return to democracy) from the major talk shows on television.

Some institutions showed recognition of his career in the days after his death, such as the Legislative Assembly of Costa Rica.

== Outline of his thought ==
=== On psychology ===
The concept of the intentionality of the consciousness, which had been taken up by Franz Brentano from medieval scholasticism and developed by Edmund Husserl in Ideas Pertaining to a Pure Phenomenology and to a Phenomenological Philosophy, takes central importance in the thought of Silo. In it he made a differentiation between sensation, perception and imagination:

understanding feeling as the register obtained when detecting a stimulus from the external or internal environment and the variation in the tone of work of the sense involved. (...)

Understanding perception as a structure of sensations made by the consciousness referred to a sense, or several senses (...)

Preferring to understand the image as a re-presentation and formalization of sensations or perceptions, coming from the external or internal environment. The image is therefore not a "copy" but a synthesis, an intention and therefore is not mere passivity of the consciousness. (...)

In this work, an account of the image is given as an active way for the consciousness to be in the world which can not be independent of spatiality and as a way in which it accomplishes the many functions it performs, depending on the position assumed in this spatiality. (...)

To every perception there is a corresponding representation that unfailingly modifies the “data” of “reality.” In other words, the structure perception-image is a behaviour of the consciousness in the world, whose meaning is the transformation of this world. (...)

This mode of consciousness-being-in-the-world is basically a mode of action in perspective, whose immediate spatial reference is the body itself, not simply the intrabody. But the body, while being an object of the world, is also an object of the landscape and an object of transformation, and in this way it ends up becoming a prosthesis of human intentionality. If images allow recognition and action, then according to the structure of the landscape and the needs of individuals and peoples (or according to what they consider their needs to be), they will, in the same way, tend to transform the world.

— Psychology of the Image - Contributions to Thought

Rejecting ideas of the unconscious and subconscious as epochal myths based on scientific premises which are incorrectly formulated, it focuses on the study of the co-presence, impulses, levels of consciousness, centres of response, etc., as part of the psychism and the functioning of consciousness. What is new in Silo's thinking is the definition of the space of representation:

All the senses produce their representations, and this representation is given in a mental space, this space sets an ambit where the representations are emplaced that have originated from different perceptual sources. This space is nothing other than the totality of internal representations proper to the cenaesthetic system. And so the mental space is a sort of screen that reproduces the impulses of one’s cenaesthesia. Thus, every phenomenon of perception that arrives to the apparatus of coordination is emplaced at some point of the representation screen. Whether it is a matter of a sound, a smell, or an object that enters visually, in every case it is emplaced at some point of the space of representation. This space not only has gradation on two planes—it has depth, it has volume, and it approximately replicates one’s own body. It is a “body” of representation, or—if you prefer—a “spatial referential background.”

— Psychology II - Psychology Notes

=== On the conception of the human being ===
Silo differentiates himself further from the academic ambits with a conception of the human being which led to the formation of the Humanist Movement. In fact, the definition of humanist movement as the group of people who study and interpret the needs of human beings and provide the conditions for advancing from the field of determinism to the field of freedom, i.e. to overcome pain and suffering, both individually and socially, is implied in the idea of human beings:

Human beings are historical beings whose mode of social action transforms their own nature. If we accept this definition, we will also have to accept that this is a being that can, intentionally, transform its physical constitution. And indeed, that is something we see happening. This process began with the use of instruments that, arrayed before the body as external “prostheses,” allowed human beings to extend their reach, to extend and amplify their senses, and to increase their strength and the quality of their work. Though not endowed with the ability to function in aerial or aquatic environments, they have nonetheless created the means to move through these media, and have even begun to migrate from their natural environment, the planet Earth. Today, moreover, human beings have begun to penetrate into the interior of their own bodies, transplanting organs, intervening in their neurochemistry, practicing in vitro fertilization, and even manipulating their genes. If by the word “nature” we have wanted to signify something fixed and unchanging, then it’s a seriously deficient idea, even when applied to what is most object-like about the human being, that is, the body. In light of this, it is clear that nothing of what is termed “natural morality” or “natural law” or “natural institutions” exists through nature; on the contrary, all of this is socio-historic.

— Third Letter to my Friends

Humanist action does not draw its inspiration from imaginative theories about God, nature, society, or history. Rather, it begins with life’s necessities, which consist most elementally of avoiding pain and moving toward pleasure. Yet human life entails the additional need to foresee future necessities, based on past experience and the intention to improve the present situation. Human experience is not simply the product of natural physiological accumulation or selection, as happens in all other species. It is social experience and personal experience directed toward overcoming pain in the present and avoiding it in the future. Human work, accumulated in the productions of society, is passed on and transformed from one generation to the next in a continuous struggle to improve the existing or natural conditions, even those of the human body itself. Human beings must therefore be defined as historical beings whose mode of social behaviour is capable of transforming both the world and their own nature. Each time that individuals or human groups violently impose themselves on others, they succeed in detaining history, turning their victims into “natural” objects. Nature does not have intentions, and thus to negate the freedom and intentions of others is to convert them into natural objects without intentions, objects to be used.

— Sixth letter to my Friends

=== On spirituality ===
Silo explains his thoughts about spirituality in these terms:

All human beings should have full rights to believe, or not to believe, in immortality and the sacred. The Message gives the utmost importance to the themes of immortality and the sacred because, depending on how a person places him or herself with respect to these themes, so will be his or her orientation in life.

The Message takes on the difficulties of openly examining the fundamental beliefs, clashing with the censorship and self-censorship that inhibit freedom of thought and good conscience. Within the context of freedom of interpretation, immortality for some refers to the actions performed in life continuing in the world despite physical death. For others, the memory that continues in loved ones, or even in societies, guarantees the persistence after physical death. For still others, immortality is accepted as personal persistence in another level of existence.

Continuing with freedom of interpretation, some feel the sacred as one’s deepest affection. For them, their children or other loved ones represent the sacred and possess an utmost value that should not be defiled for any reason. There are some others who consider the human being and his universal rights as sacred. Still others experience the divinity as the essence of the sacred.

The different positions taken with respect to the themes of immortality and the sacred should not be simply “tolerated,” but rather genuinely respected.

— Silo's Message

== Published books ==
- 1979: The Inner Look.
- 1981: The Internal Landscape.
- 1989: Humanize the Earth (consisting of the Inner Look, the Internal Landscape and the Human Landscape).
- 1989: Guided Experiences.
- 1991: Contributions to Thought.
- 1991: Universal Root Myths.
- 1993: Letters to my Friends.
- 1993: The Day of the Winged Lion.
- 1996: Dictionary of New Humanism.
- 1996: Silo Speaks.
- 1998: Collected Works - Volume I.
- 2002: Collected Works - Volume II.
- 2006: Notes on Psychology (collection of conferences, 1975, 1976, 1978 and 2006).
- 2008: Silo's Message.

All these books are translated and published in the most common major languages.

== Criticism and influence ==
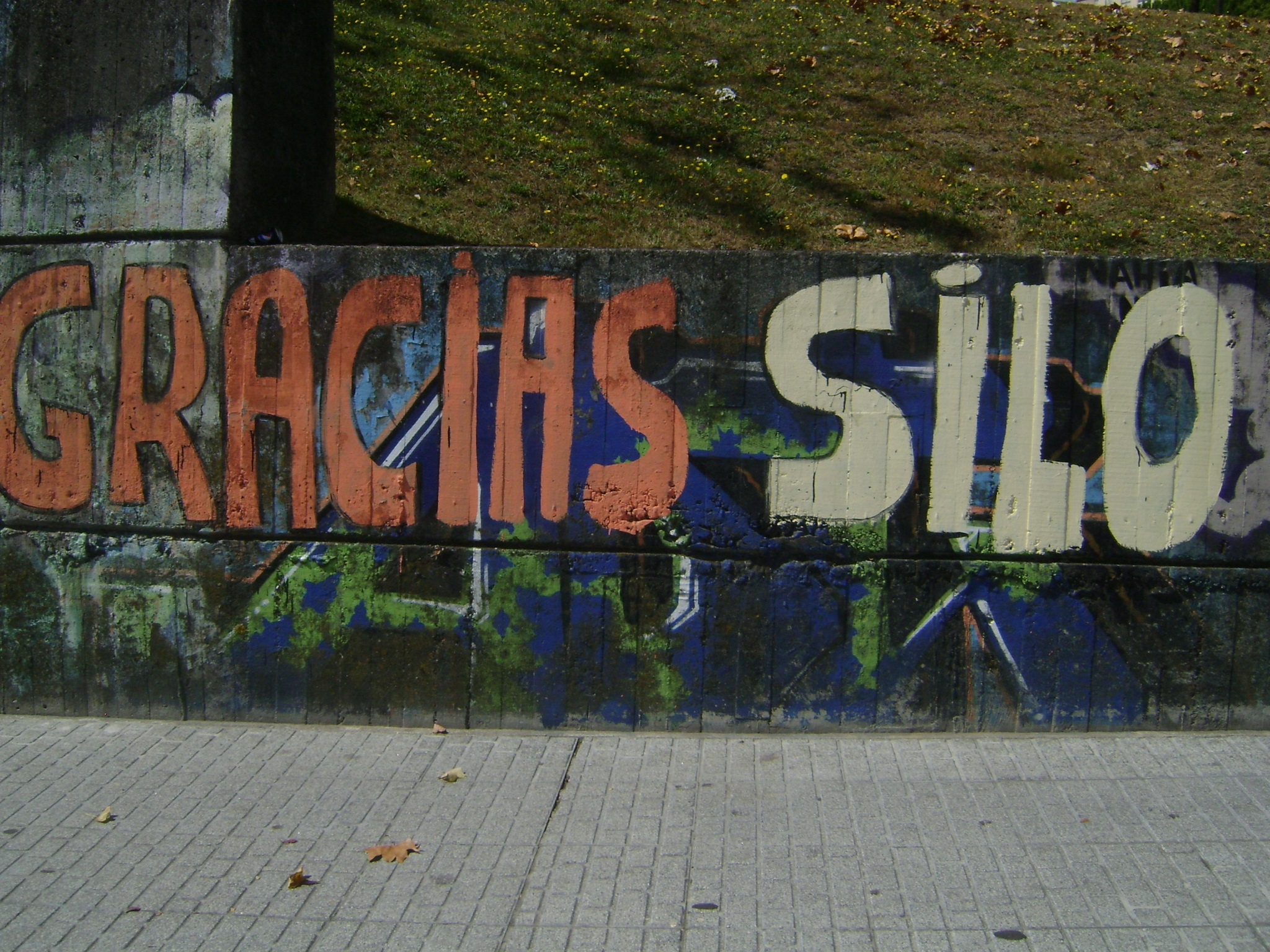
"Thanks Silo". Graffiti in A Coruña, Spain supporting Silo.

In a journal of anthropology and American studies in the early 1970s, sections of the left began a campaign against Silo and his followers, who were accused of fascism and of being a reactionary movement. At the same time, conservative sectors of the Catholic Church accused them of threatening the family and Christian morality, as seen in the Chilean newspapers of the time. According to Siloists, this campaign was a reaction to the growing influence of Silo with the youth and the proposal of a new leftist, humanist, non-Marxist ideology.

The notoriety of his influence was reflected in obituaries in the newspapers Página/12 in Argentina and El País in Spain. The latter refers to Silo as the "founder of a philosophy that came to gather a million followers in over 100 countries" and "a strange character for the West, one who could have been born in the East. He trumpeted a spiritual and social change as the foundation of the “human nation”".

Two months after his death, he was honoured at the Book Fair in Mar del Plata, Argentina.
