= Karl Schnaase =

German art historian and jurist (1798–1875)

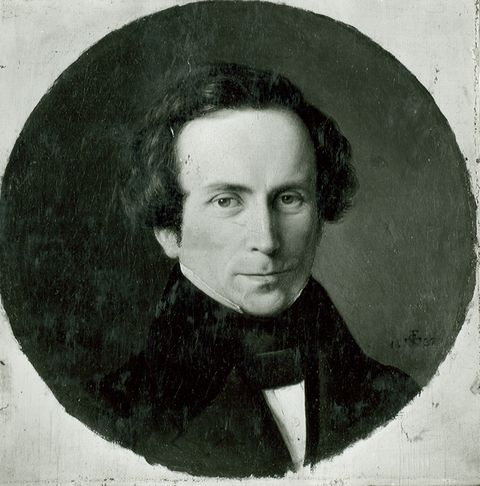
Karl Schnaase; portrait by Eduard Steinbrück

Karl Schnaase (7 September 1798 – 20 May 1875) was a distinguished German art historian and jurist. He was one of the founders of modern art history, and the author of one of the first surveys of the history of art.

== Life ==
Schnaase was born in Danzig (Gdańsk) in West Prussia. As a law student at the University of Heidelberg, Schnaase attended the lectures of Hegel on philosophy in the spring of 1817. In the fall of 1818 he followed Hegel to the University of Berlin, where he attended the lectures that would become the Encyclopedia of the Philosophical Sciences. However, his philosophical studies were cut short when he passed his first juristic exam in July 1819, and received a position in the municipal court of Danzig. Before returning to Danzig, Schnaase travelled to Dresden, and was deeply impressed by the art collections of that city.

For much of the 1820s Schnaase was employed as an assessor in Königsberg, while maintaining his interest in art. From 1826 through 1827 he embarked on a year-long journey through Italy, visiting Rome, Naples, Florence, and Milan, among other cities. At the end of his journey he hiked through the Tyrol and the Bavarian Alps to Munich, where he became ill.

Settled once again in Königsberg, Schnaase began to plan a book based on his Italian journey, which was however never completed. In 1828 his legal career took him to Marienwerder (Kwidzyn), and in 1829 south again to Düsseldorf, whence he was able to acquaint himself with the medieval monuments of the Rhineland. He also found in the Rhineland a more congenial society in which to pursue his interest in art history, and in particular developed a friendship with Gottfried Kinkel.

In summer 1830 Schnaase travelled through the Low Countries; his examination of the monuments there led to his first major publication, the Niederländische Briefe (Dutch letters), which appeared in 1834. Although written in the form of a conventional travel narrative, the Briefe constituted in fact a major contribution to the theoretical literature on art history. As Michael Podro has written, Schnaase's first book

is the principal transposition of Hegel's thought into the general discussion of the development of art.... In his Niederländische Briefe Schnaase responded to two difficulties in Hegel's Aesthetics; the assumption that past works of art were definitively understood from the point of view of the present, and that art was representative of its culture rather than contributing to it. The way in which he did this dominated one critical tradition for the next hundred years.

In brief, Schnaase argued that the various periods of art history were interconnected, and indeed mutually illuminating. Thus the modern historian can most fully understand a given monument through consideration of what had come before and what would follow. He wrote

I begin to feel in each section of the past its present together with its future. In this way clear and exact historical consideration leads to higher aesthetic realisation... which feels in the beauty of each individual period its connection with the others.

A later portrait of Schnaase

The contemporary viewer is further benefited by his ability to view an artwork, not as an object with a particular function, but as material for purely aesthetic contemplation. The contemplation of art as detached from its function allows the historian to view art as autonomous from, or indeed constitutive of, cultural developments.

The Niederländische Briefe therefore provided the intellectual justification for art history as an autonomous discipline, and indeed Schnaase's next major project was the composition of his monumental Geschichte der bildenden Künste (History of the fine arts). He was able to pursue this project despite his continuing employment as a jurist. As he neared completion of the first volume, however, Schnaase was surprised by the appearance of a Handbuch der Kunstgeschichte (Handbook of art history) (1841) by Franz Theodor Kugler. Kugler's work, which he claimed to be "the first comprehensive survey of art" seemed to duplicate Schnaase's project. Schnaase became convinced, however, that if Kugler was his better in technical matters, he could still offer a unique, general viewpoint of the development of art. The first two volumes, on ancient near eastern and on classical art, respectively, were published in 1843, and dedicated to Kugler.

Schnaase's work was distinguished from Kugler's by its "Hegelian desire to write a history of art as a history of the mentality of the human race, an endeavor specifically disavowed by Kugler." The first volume of his Geschichte began with a lengthy treatise on aesthetics, indicating a philosophical inclination that was criticized in reviews by both Kugler and Gustav Friedrich Waagen.

Despite this critical skepticism, and a new appointment to the court of appeals in Berlin in 1848, Schnaase continued to produce new volumes of his Geschichte. A volume on early Christian and Islamic art appeared in 1844; one on "the actual middle ages" in 1850; the Gothic in 1856; the late Middle Ages in 1861; and medieval Italian art in 1864. At this point, instead of continuing his survey into the Renaissance, Schnaase began work on a second edition of the existing work. He was aided in the revision by a number of prominent art historians. It has been suggested that Schnaase stopped where he did "because of the appearance of Jacob Burckhardt's equally contextual works on the Renaissance as well as... the areligious attitudes of the modern era."

Schnaase retired from his legal commitments in 1857, and received a series of awards in honor of his art-historical achievements, including an honorary doctorate from the University of Bonn and the Order of Maximilian from the King of Bavaria.

Later in life Schnaase became increasingly preoccupied by the relationship between art and religion. He was among the founders of the Verein für religiöse Kunst in der evangelischen Kirche (Society for Religious Art in the Lutheran Church) and a co-editor of the Christliche Kunstblatt (Journal for Christian Art). Two of his lectures on this subject were published: Über das Verhältniss der Kunst zum Christenthum (On the relationship of art to Christianity) (1852) and Bildung und Christenthum (Education and Christianity) (1861).

Schnaase continued to travel across Europe until the end of his life, despite his increasingly poor health. He died in Wiesbaden in 1875.

== Legacy ==
Schnaase's work was of tremendous importance for the development of art history as an autonomous discipline. His Geschichte facilitated the teaching of art in German-speaking countries, and his theoretical concerns and formulations influenced a number of later art historians. Among these, Alois Riegl may have been the most influenced by Schnaase's thought; Riegl's theory of the Kunstwollen was deeply indebted to Schnaase's Niederländische Briefe.

== Sources ==
- W. Lübke, "Carl Schnaase, biographische Skizze," in C. Schnaase, Geschichte der bildenden Künste im 15. Jahrhundert, ed. W. Lübke (Stuttgart, 1879), xv-lxxxiv. Available online.
- M. Podro, The critical historians of art (New Haven, 1982), 31–43.
- Schwarzer, M. (1995). "Origins of the art history survey text". Art Journal. 54 (3): 24–29. Archived from the original on November 3, 2004 – via FindArticles.
