= Estadio Feliciano Gambarte =

Football stadium in Godoy Cruz, Argentina

Feliciano Gambarte Stadium
- Estadio Feliciano Gambarte
- La Bodega
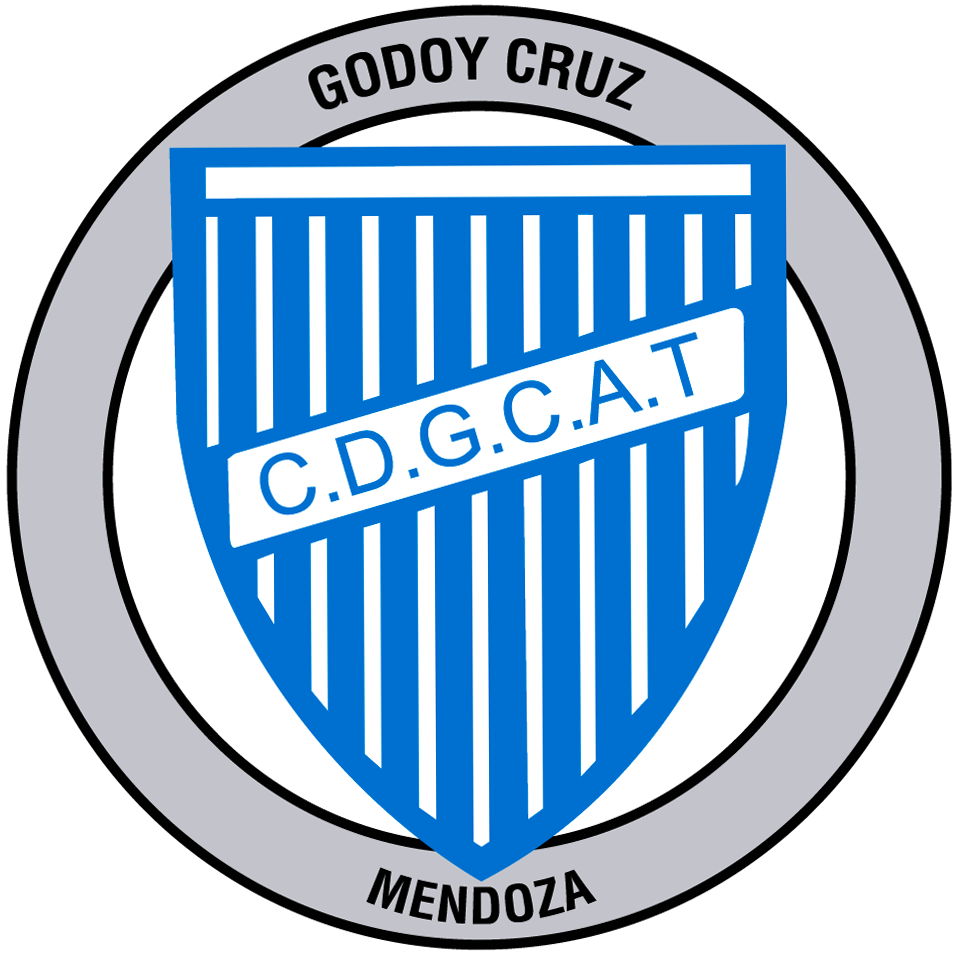

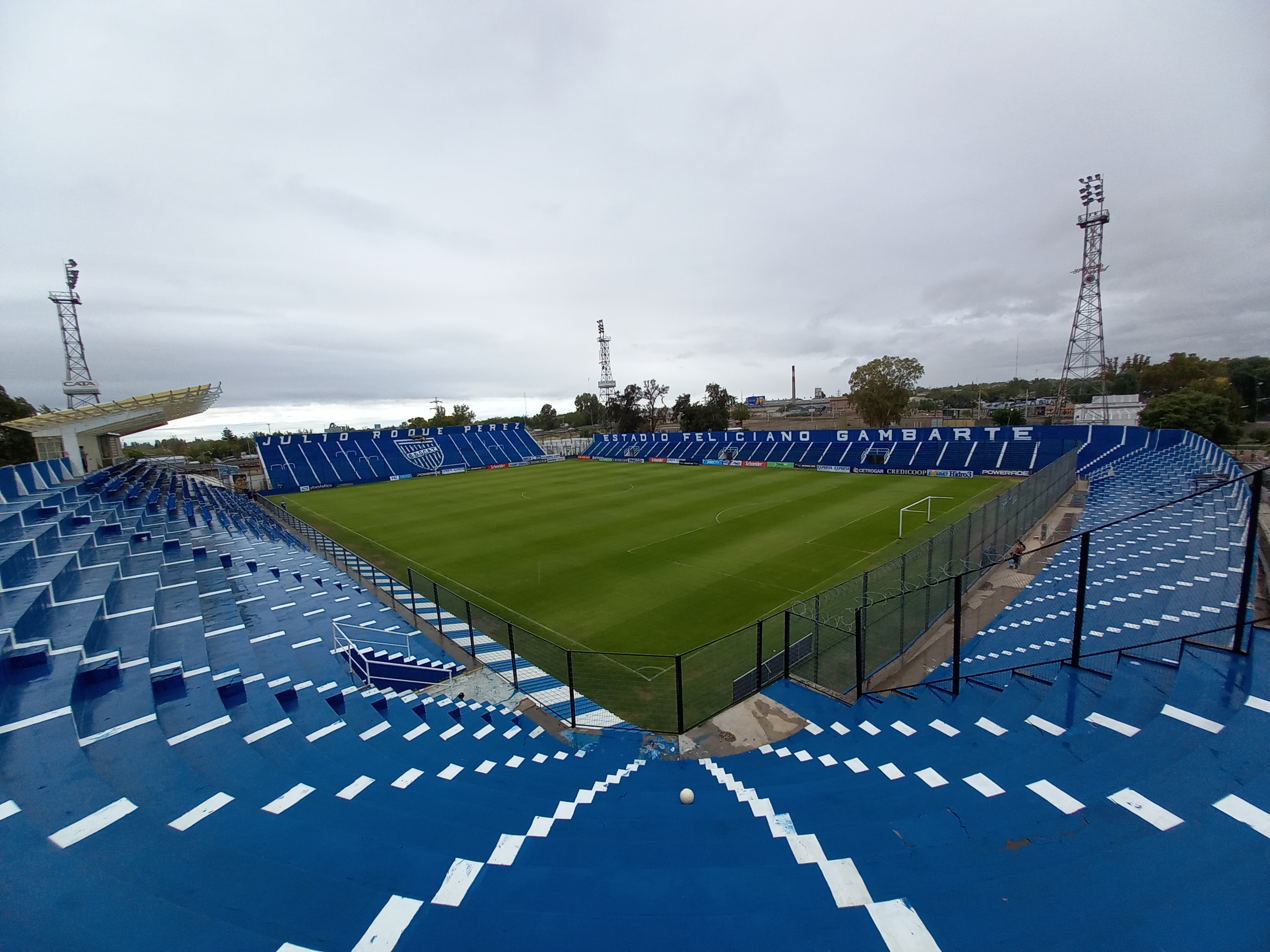
- Interactive map of Feliciano Gambarte Stadium
- Former names: Estadio Nuevo (1959–86)
- Address: Flores 630; Godoy Cruz, Mendoza; Argentina
- Coordinates: 32°55′13″S 68°50′22″W
- Owner: C.D. Godoy Cruz
- Capacity: 21,000
- Surface: Grass
- Field size: 100 x 70 m

Construction
- Opened: 3 October 1959; 66 years ago
- Renovated: 2022–25
- Expanded: 2022–25
- Architects: Juan Tinelli; Esteban Stareloni

Tenant
- Godoy Cruz (1959–2005, 2025–)

Website
- clubgodoycruz.com.ar//estadio

Estadio Feliciano Gambarte, nicknamed La Bodega, is a stadium in Godoy Cruz, Mendoza, Argentina. It is used primarily for football matches and is owned and operated by Godoy Cruz Antonio Tomba. The stadium, inaugurated in 1959, holds 21,000 spectators.

The stadium was named "Estadio Nuevo" until 1986, when it was renamed "Feliciano Gambarte", to honor former athlete and president of the club. In 2023, the club started works to refurbish and expand the stadium in order to increase its capacity to 21,000 spectators. The stadium was reopened in July 2025.

== History ==
The first Godoy Cruz stadium was inaugurated in November 1923 on a land located on Castelli and Las Heras street. The administrative seat of the club was also established there. Godoy Cruz played their home matches there until in January 1959 the club announced the construction of a new stadium. It would be erected on land 2 ha land previously donated and would be financed by the club members.

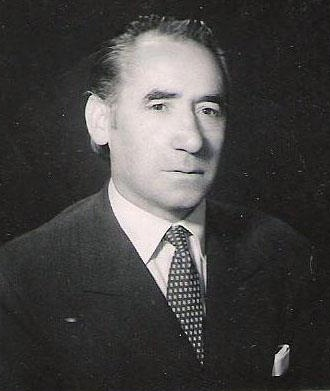
Feliciano Gambarte, sportsman and president of the club in the 1940s. The stadium was named after him in 1986

In January 1954 the provincial senate and deputy chamber promulgated law 2.292 that ruled the donation and paved the way for the sign of the public deed between the Municipality and C.D. Godoy Cruz. Project included construction of a football pitch (100 x 70 m) and grandstands for 11,000 people. Other facilities to build included tennis, basketball, and bocce courts.

The stadium was inaugurated on 3 October 1959 with a friendly match vs. Andes Talleres Sport Club. Later, the club refurbished and expanded the stadium. Improvements included a lighting system consisting of four towers (inaugurated during a 1969 Copa Argentina match vs Chacarita Juniors).

On 1 March 1964, Brazilian Santos FC (with superstar Pelé, considered the best player of his time) visited the stadium to play a friendly match vs. Godoy Cruz. Santos won the match 3–2. After the match, Godoy Cruz executives invited the Brazilian team to an asado in Chacras de Coria town, where Pelé met former international footballer Raimundo Orsi, who had moved to live in Mendoza years ago.

The last significant refurbishment made to the stadium was in 1994 when Godoy Cruz promoted to Primera B Nacional. The venue was adapted in compliance with requirements of the Association.

After Godoy Cruz promoted to Primera División in 2006, the stadium had to be refurbished again to fulfil the requirements of the division stipulated by the Association rules. Meanwhile, the football team have been playing their home games at Estadio Malvinas Argentinas. In August 2022, the popular grandstand of the stadium was demolished. A new and more modern stand will be built to replace it. As of December 2022, the stadium was still being remodelled. Improvements to be made include the construction of new dressing rooms and modern grandstands.

In November 2023, Godoy Cruz announced that Estadio Feliciano Gambarte would be operative again in June 2024. Nevertheless, works were delayed and the stadium was finally re-opened in July 2025, 20 years after being closed for refurbishments.
