= José Manuel Albares =

Spanish diplomat (born 1972)

The Most Excellent José Manuel Albares
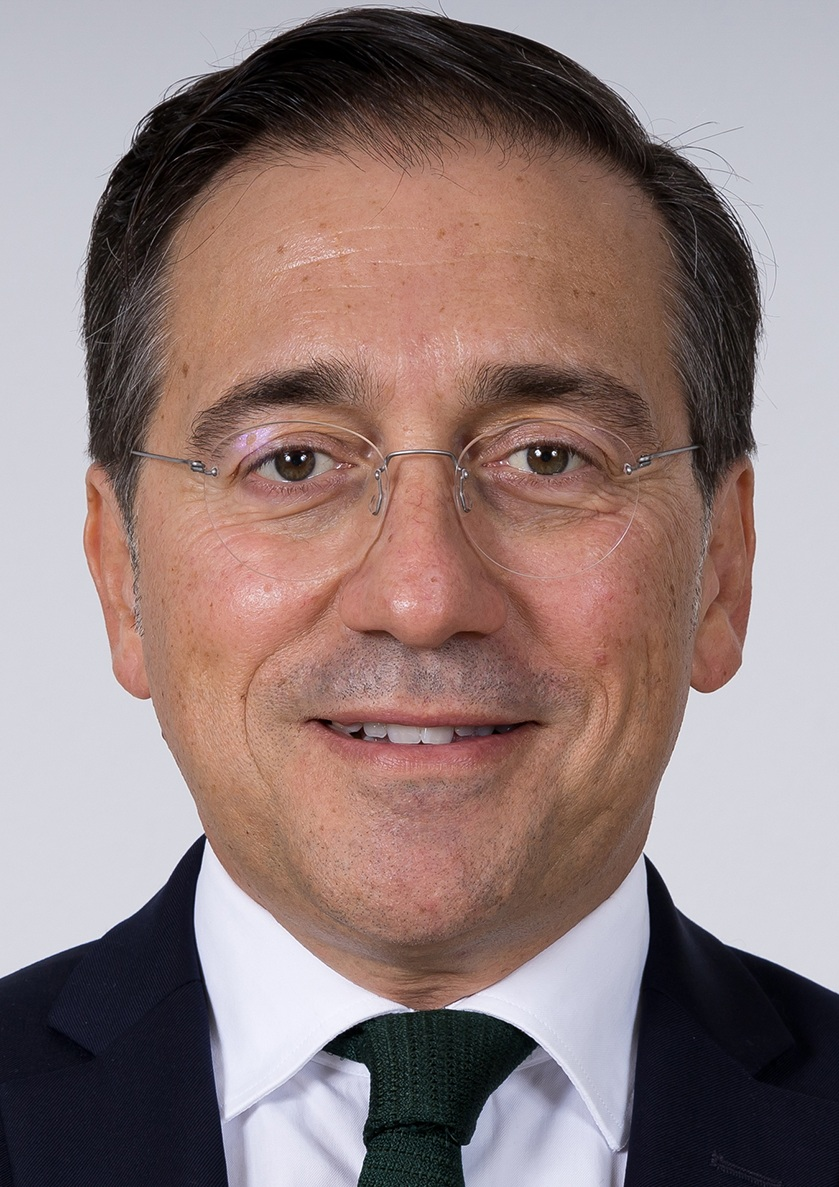
- Official portrait, 2025

Minister of Foreign Affairs, European Union and Cooperation
- Incumbent
- Assumed office 12 July 2021
- Prime Minister: Pedro Sánchez
- Preceded by: Arancha González Laya

Ambassador of Spain to France accredited to Monaco
- In office 5 February 2020 (Note: To Monaco since 13 May 2020) – 12 July 2021
- Preceded by: Fernando Carderera Soler
- Succeeded by: Victorio Redondo Baldrich

Secretary-General for International Affairs, European Union, G20 and Global Security
- In office 21 June 2018 – 29 January 2020

Member of the Congress of Deputies
- Incumbent
- Assumed office 17 August 2023
- Constituency: Madrid

Personal details
- Born: 22 March 1972 (age 54) Madrid, Spain
- Party: Spanish Socialist Workers' Party
- Spouse: Hélène Davo (m. 1997; div. 2021)
- Children: 4
- Occupation: Diplomat

José Manuel Albares Bueno (pronounced [xosemaˈnwel alˈβaɾes]; born 22 March 1972) is a Spanish politician and diplomat who has been serving as Minister of Foreign Affairs, European Union and Cooperation in the government of Prime Minister Pedro Sánchez since 2021. As a politician from the Spanish Socialist Workers' Party (PSOE), he was elected to the 15th Congress of Deputies in the 2023 Spanish general election from Madrid.

== Early life and education ==
Born in 1972 in Madrid, he was raised in a humble family from Usera. Albares earned a licentiate degree in Law from the University of Deusto and also a diploma in Business Sciences.

== Career in the diplomatic service ==
As he joined the diplomatic career, Albares served as consul in Bogotá, as well as advisor in the Permanent Representation of Spain before the OECD. Key advisor of PSOE's Pedro Sánchez during the latter's first spell as party leader, Sánchez appointed Albares to a post in the Prime Minister Cabinet Office, once he became Prime Minister in June 2018: Secretary General of International Affairs, European Union, G20 and Global Security, with rank of Under-Secretary. Albares, who left then a post as cultural attaché in the Spanish embassy in Paris, was sworn in on 21 June. Affiliated to the PSOE's grouping in Paris, he was chosen as one of the drafters of the framework presentation for the party's 40th federal congress. Albares was appointed as Ambassador to France in February 2020 and to Monaco in May 2020.

== Minister of Foreign Affairs ==
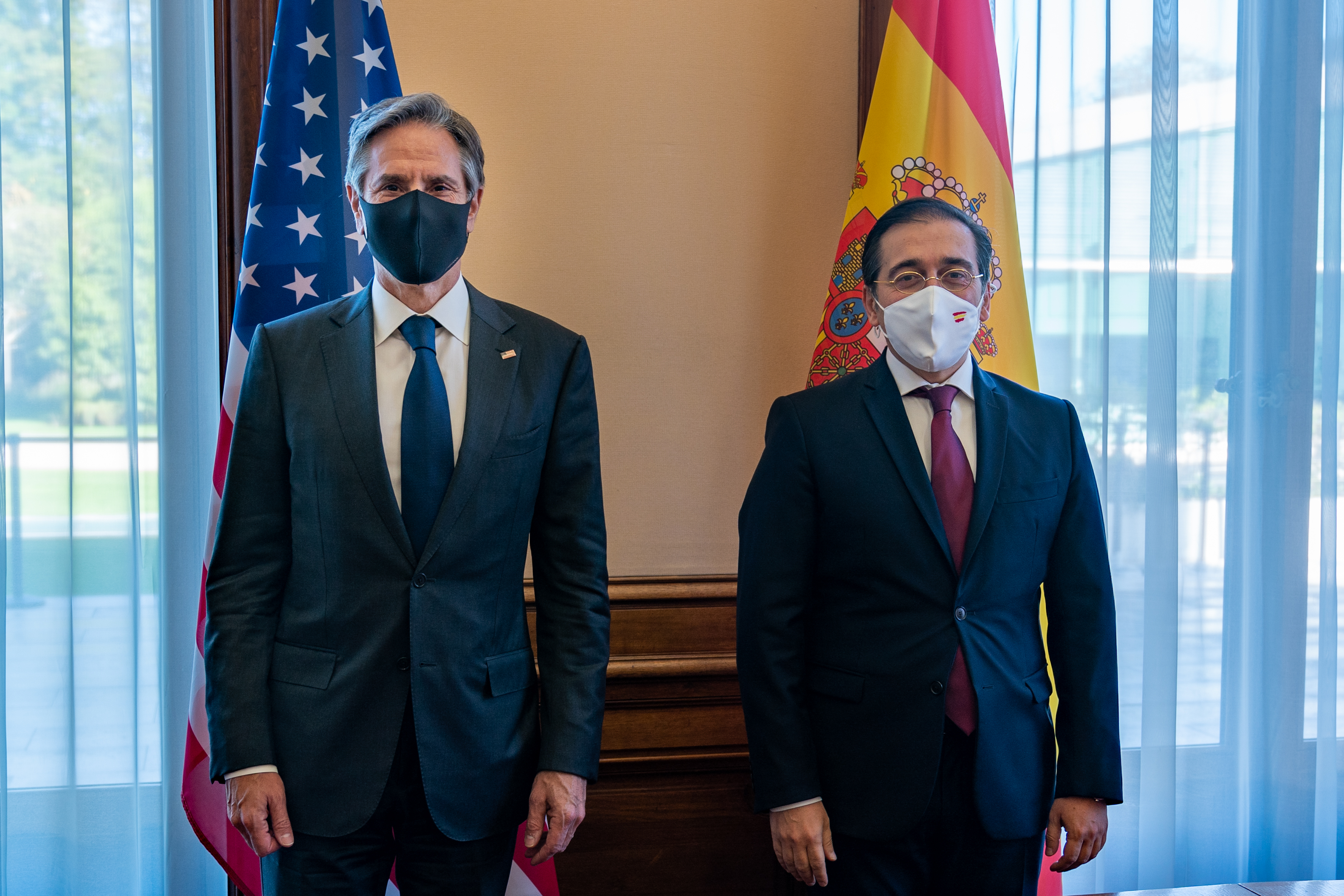
Albares meets with U.S. Secretary of State Antony Blinken in Paris, 6 October 2021

In July 2021, Albares was revealed as Sánchez' pick as Minister of Foreign Affairs, European Union and Cooperation in a cabinet reshuffle. He was sworn on into office on 12 July 2021. During his first days as head of the Foreign Department, Albares managed to reduce tensions with Morocco and rebuild relations after Spain allowed, for humanitarian reasons, the Saharawi leader, Brahim Ghali, to be treated in a hospital in Logroño. Proof of this were the declarations of King Mohammed VI of Morocco, who assured in August 2021 that he wanted to "inaugurate an unprecedented stage" in relations between the two countries.

Albares addressed the Foreign Affairs Committee of the Congress of Deputies for the first time on 30 August 2021, to give an account of his first decisions as head of the Foreign Ministry, the general lines that he would develop and the 2021 Afghanistan crisis. In his appearance, he revealed that on 15 July 2021 his Department, through the Embassy in Afghanistan, warned and recommended the Spanish nationals in the country to leave it. This allowed that, when the Afghan crisis broke out, only five Spanish nationals remained, in addition to diplomatic and security personnel. He also announced that the government had no intention of recognizing the new Taliban government and that they would continue to remove people from Afghanistan by other means. In October 2021, in a joint operation with the Ministry of Defence, the government evacuated via Pakistan more than 240 collaborators and their families.

As for general policy, Albares demanded that the opposition treat foreign policy as a "state policy", and regarding the restructuring that he carried out in the Ministry as soon as he took office, he affirmed that one of his objectives was to strengthen the policy on North Africa, the Sahel and Latin America, highlighting about the latter that he considers "all Ibero-American countries equally important, regardless of their size or economic weight".

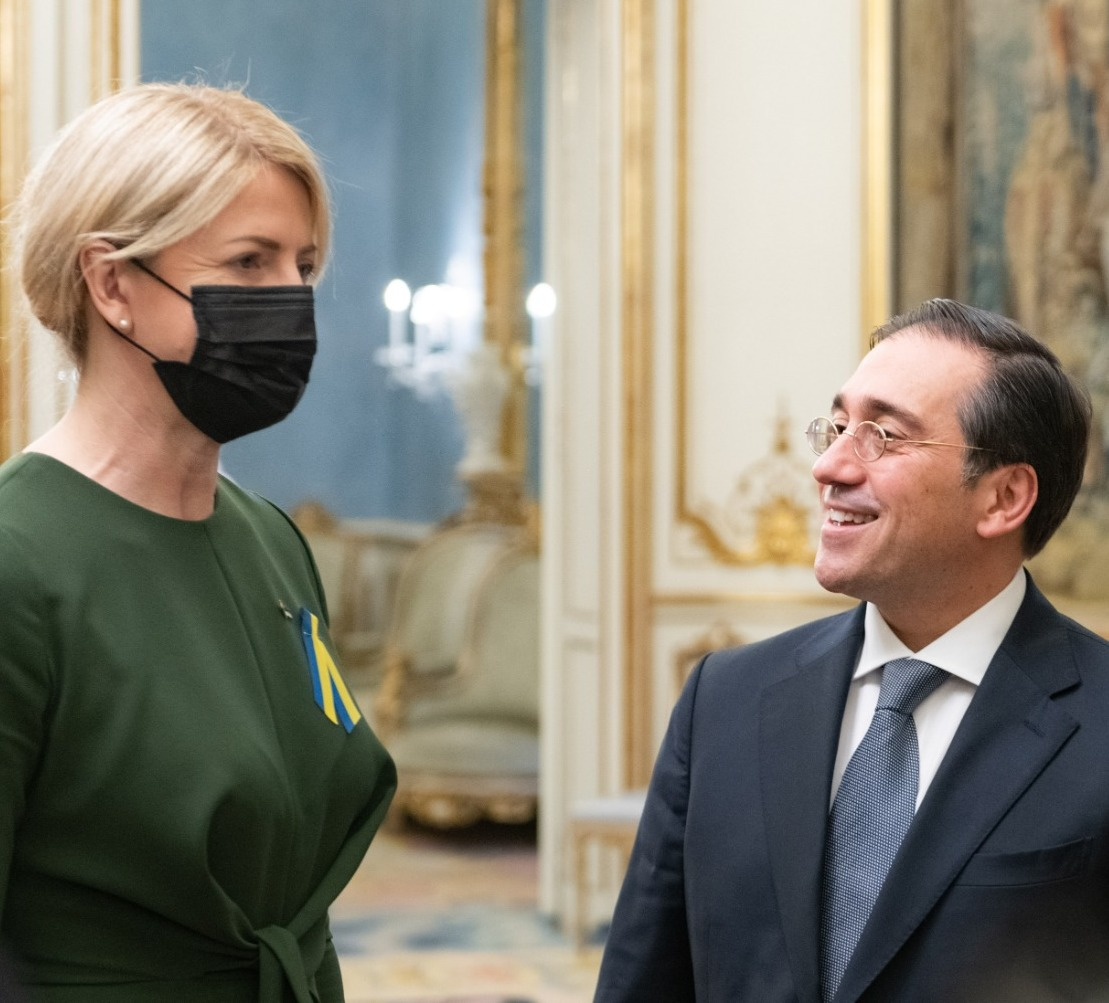
Albares with Estonia's Minister of Foreign Affairs Eva-Maria Liimets in 2022

Another issue that he had to deal with as head of the Foreign Ministry was to guarantee the permanence in Spain of the World Tourism Organization (UNWTO). For a few months, it had been rumored that Saudi Arabia planned to make a proposal to move the headquarters to his country and that the then Secretary-General, Zurab Pololikashvili, wouldn't oppose it. Despite being only rumors and the silence of the Secretary-General in this regard, the government, headed Albares, carried out a diplomatic offensive consisting of fulfilling the existing promise to give the UNWTO a new headquarters and a series of consultations with ambassadors from different countries, which allowed Spain to guarantee a blocking minority with European and Latin American countries in the event of the Saudi proposal. Finally, Saudi Arabia informed the Government of Spain that it would not present any candidacy.

In relation to the 2021–2022 Russo-Ukrainian crisis, he declared in January that the Spanish government was committed to dialogue as a distinguishing feature of European foreign policy but that "it had to be very clear [with Russia], dialogue it is not negotiation. We cannot accept things that are unacceptable", and said "no one can mark who can be a member of an international organization and who cannot", in relation to the possible accession of Ukraine to NATO or the European Union. Following the Bucha massacre in April 2022, Albares expelled some 25 Russian diplomats and embassy staff from Madrid, joining other European Union countries in its response to alleged war crimes by Russian troops in Ukraine.

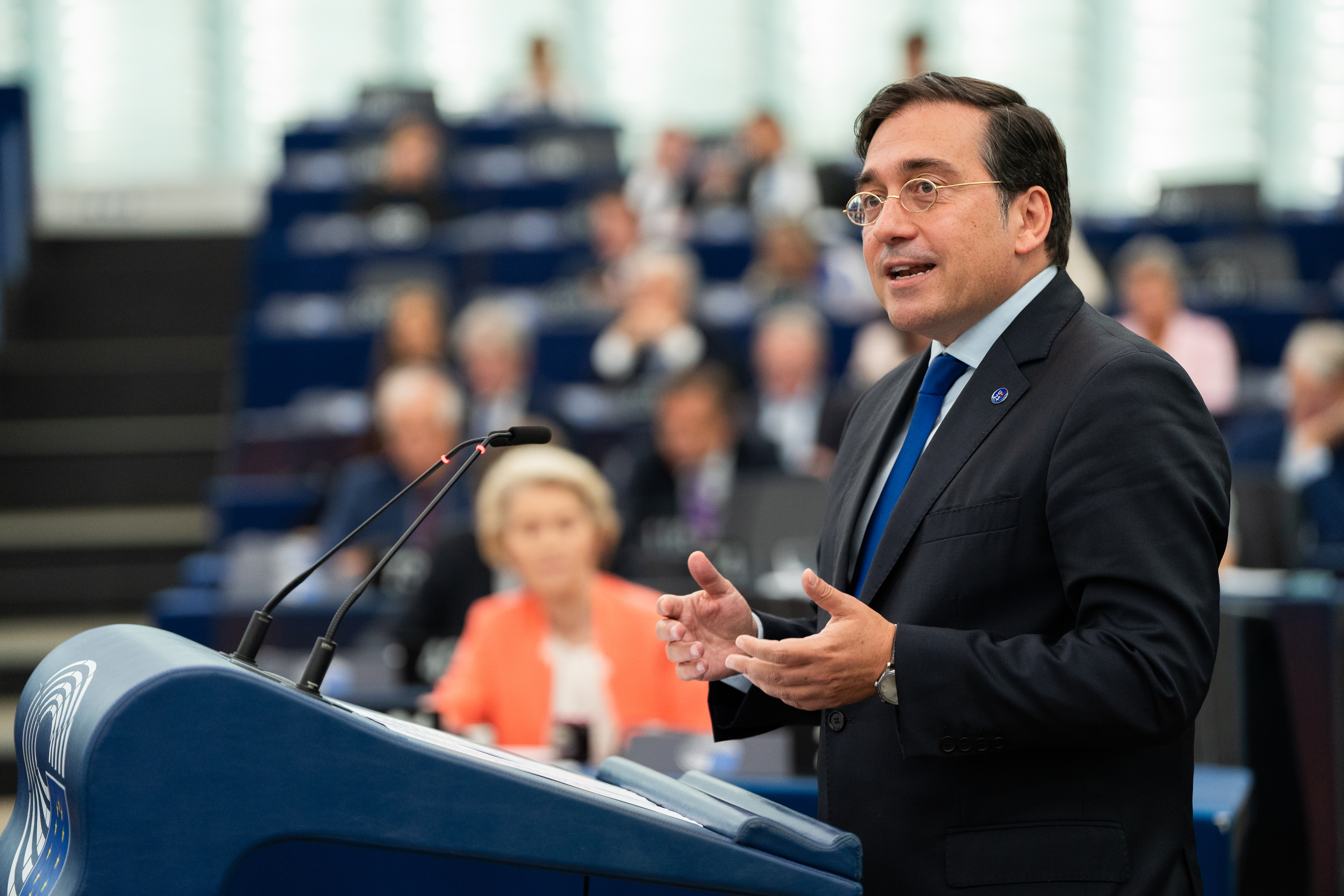
Albares addressing the European Parliament during the 2023 State of the Union.

In relation to the continuing Gaza war, in both October 2023 and January 2024 Albarés declared that Spain would no longer as of 7 October 2023 export arms to Israel, but the Centre Delàs published data showing that the licenses for such sales had not been revoked, allowing 1 million euros of arms exports in November. In May 2024, Albares said the bombing of Rafah was "one more day with innocent Palestinian civilians being killed", adding that the gravity of the attack "is even larger" as it comes after the ICJ order directing Israel to halt its operations in Rafah and the rest of Gaza.

In February 2025, Israeli Defense Minister Israel Katz proposed that some Palestinians from Gaza immigrate to Spain. Albares rejected Katz's proposal, saying that "Gaza is the land of the people of Gaza" and should be part of a future Palestinian state. In September 2025, Albares expressed support for the expulsion of the Israel–Premier Tech team from the 2025 Vuelta a España after pro-Palestinian protesters demonstrated against their presence in Bilbao.

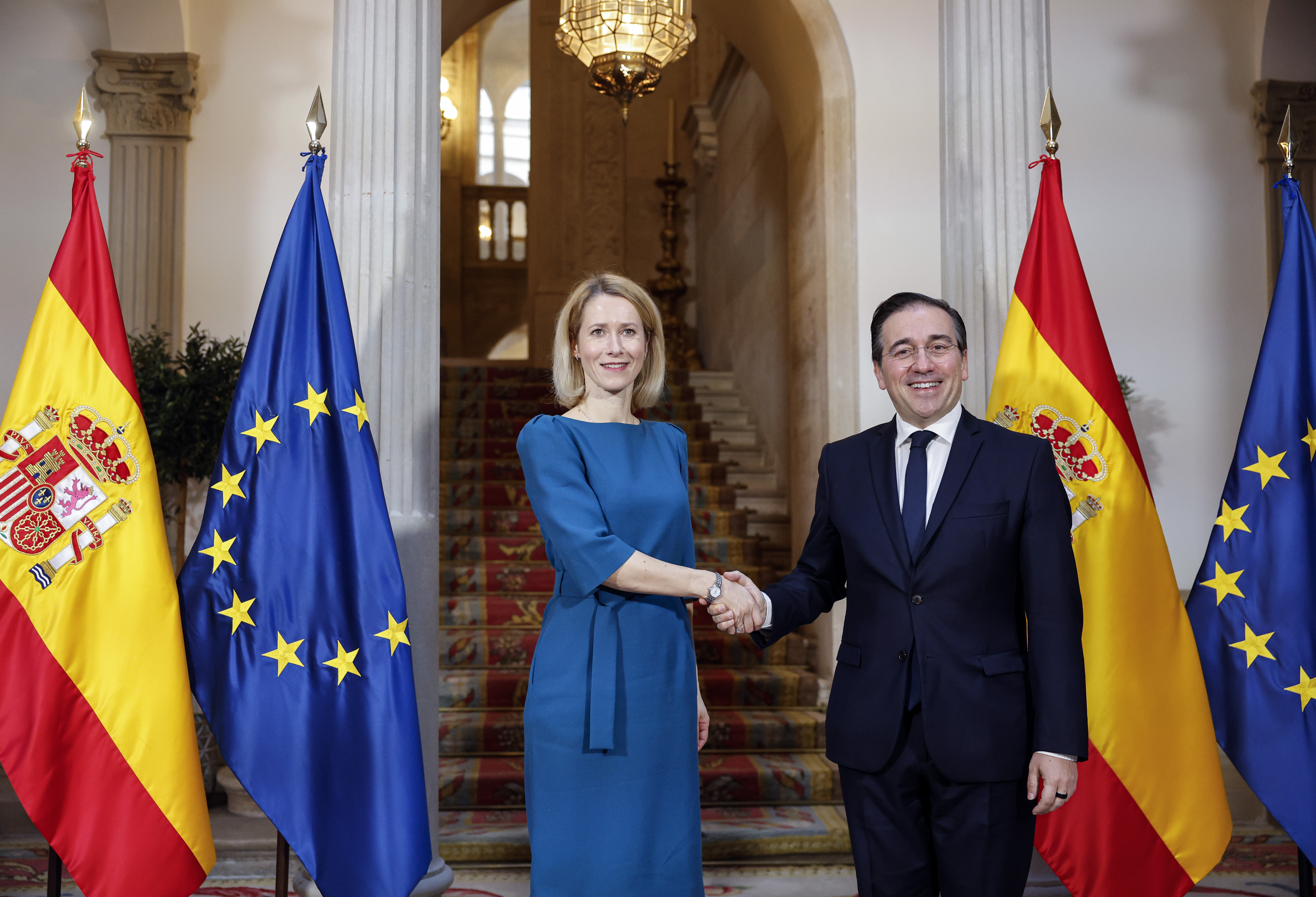
Albares meets with High Representative of the Union for Foreign Affairs and Security Policy of the European Union Kaja Kallas in Madrid, 31 March 2025

In May 2025, following an international summit on Gaza held in Madrid, Spanish Foreign Minister José Manuel Albares noted that "a broad majority of countries" supported reviewing the EU’s trade agreement with Israel. He emphasized Spain's commitment to humanitarian assistance and called for stronger international efforts to end the conflict and protect civilians in Gaza. A few months later, on 30 August 2025, Albares announced that the Spanish government would provide "all its diplomatic and consular protection" to citizens joining the Global Sumud Flotilla from Barcelona, recalling that Spanish authorities had offered the same support during earlier flotilla missions.

After the 2026 United States strikes in Venezuela, Albares described Trump's actions as an "extremely dangerous precedent". In June 2026, Albares defended Spain's decision not to comment on Morocco's killing of Sahrawi commander Lehbib Mohamed Abdelaziz, stating that "no country in the world has commented on it" and that it was in Spain's best interests to maintain good relations with Morocco.

== Other activities ==
- Elcano Royal Institute for International and Strategic Studies, Member of the Board of Trustees

== Honours ==
- Colombia: Grand Cross of the Order of San Carlos (8 August 2022)
- Oman: Order of Royal Commendation (2025)

Political offices
| Preceded by Arancha González Laya | Minister of Foreign Affairs; 2021–present | Incumbent |
