= Leioproctus abdominis =

Scientific classification
- Kingdom: Animalia
- Phylum: Arthropoda
- Clade: Pancrustacea
- Class: Insecta
- Order: Hymenoptera
- Family: Colletidae
- Genus: Leioproctus
- Species: L. abdominis

Binomial name
- Leioproctus abdominis Michener, 1965

Synonyms
- Pasiphae abdominalis Jörgensen, 1912 Bicolletes abdominalis Jörgensen, 1912

Species of bee

Leioproctus abdominis, also known as Leioproctus (Bicolletes) abdominis, is a species of bee in the family Colletidae. It belongs to the subfamily Colletinae and the subgenus Bicolletes. The species is native to South America, where it has been recorded from Argentina.

The species was originally described as Pasiphae abdominalis by Danish-born entomologist P. Jörgensen in 1912, based on material from Mendoza Province in Argentina. Michener transferred the species to Leioproctus in 1965 and introduced the replacement name Leioproctus abdominis because the name abdominalis was already occupied within Leioproctus by Leioproctus abdominalis (Smith, 1879).

== Taxonomy ==
Leioproctus abdominis was originally described by P. Jörgensen in 1912 as Pasiphae abdominalis. Jörgensen described the species in his revision of the bees of Mendoza Province, Argentina. The original type locality is Chacras de Coria, in Mendoza Province.

The species was subsequently associated with the genus Bicolletes. Michener's 1965 classification placed it in Leioproctus, subgenus Bicolletes, under the combination Leioproctus (Bicolletes) abdominis. Michener treated abdominis as a new name required because Leioproctus already contained a species named L. abdominalis.

The name is currently accepted as Leioproctus abdominis Michener, 1965. The Integrated Taxonomic Information System lists the species as valid and places it in the family Colletidae and subfamily Colletinae.

== Distribution and habitat ==
Leioproctus abdominis is a South American species. Available catalogue records document it from Argentina, with records from the provinces of Catamarca and Mendoza.

The type material was collected at Chacras de Coria in Mendoza Province. Jörgensen recorded specimens there during his work on the bees of Mendoza.

== Biology ==
The species is a solitary bee and is associated with the ground-nesting colletid bees of the Neotropics. Available records indicate that it is a soil-excavating species.

Jörgensen recorded the species from Chacras de Coria in association with flowering plants including Clematis hilarii and Prosopis alpataco. His original material included both females and males.
