= GI Rights Network =

United States veterans' network

The GI Rights Network is a coalition of nonprofit, nongovernmental organizations that provide free and confidential information to United States military servicemembers, veterans, and their families. Most of the counseling provided by the Network is done via phone through the GI Rights Hotline 877-447-4487. In addition to phone support, the Network offers email counseling and in-person assistance at select office locations. It also maintains a website with information on discharges, military regulations, G.I. rights, and related organizations, with most content available in both English and Spanish.

== GI Rights Hotline ==
The Network provides free, confidential, non-directive counseling to callers, with a particular focus on discharges and grievances. Hotline counselors come from a variety of backgrounds and include veterans, mental health workers and attorneys. Counselors provide information and options as opposed to "legal advice" or "medical advice". Sometimes counselors assist callers in finding civilian medical providers or civilian attorneys.

== History ==
The Network began in 1994 as a coalition of several organizations which were already providing military counseling independently. The founding members saw benefit in combining resources and services to advertise one nationwide toll free number for counseling which was collectively staffed by the member organizations.

In the fall of 2006, the Network member groups incorporated the GI Rights Network as an educational non-profit organization. The Network member organizations adopted bylaws and elected a board of directors in 2009.

In 2026, the 24-hour hotline recorded double the amount of calls since the Iran was began and the Network was run though the help of the Center on Conscience and War and the Quaker House organizations.

== In the news ==
In Harper's Magazine March 2005 Kathy Dobie's cover story "AWOL in America" cites the GI Rights Network as "a national referral and counseling service for military personnel," and uses its counselors as sources for the story. "On August 23, 2004, I interviewed Robert Dove, a burly, bearded Quaker, in the Boston offices of the American Friends Service Committee, one of the groups involved with the hot line. Dove told me of getting frantic calls from the parents of recruits, and of recruits who are so appalled by basic training that they "can't eat, they literally vomit every time they put a spoon to their mouths, they're having nightmares and wetting their beds."

In a Chicago Public Radio Interview "Going AWOL – A Hotline that Helps GIs Consider Their Options," GI Rights counselor, Steve Woolford, explains the reasons why many servicemen and women go AWOL from military service.

In her second place Hearst Journalism Award Winning features piece "Sincere Disapproval" author Leah Lohse references the GI Rights Network for its expertise in dealing with conscientious objection. The story gives a view into the beliefs and struggles of one particular conscientious objector.

A USA Today story on 4/1/2009, "Army investigating unfit soldiers sent to war," cited The GI Rights Hotline for assisting servicemembers who were being deployed with disabilities and other medical problems.

[Army Sgt. Jesse] Raymo said he and others had exhausted their efforts to complain to supervisors and felt their only recourse was working with the GI Rights Hotline to draft a petition outlining their claims of mistreatment to send to members of Congress. He said more than 200 signatures have been gathered, most of them from civilians, and another petition signing event is being planned.

Bill Galvin, a GI Rights Hotline counselor, was interviewed in a June 2020 NPR story about National Guard members who are objecting to being assigned to police demonstrations.

== Network membership ==
Members and associate members of the Network include (this list includes groups who do not get "routed" calls from the Network but do provide other essential services to the Network as a whole):

- Humboldt Committee for Conscientious Objectors (Arcata, CA)
- Military Law Task Force of the National Lawyers Guild
- Bay Area GI Rights [BAGIR] (San Francisco, CA)
- Center on Conscience & War (CCW)
- Quaker House Of Fayetteville, NC
- Flint Hills GI Rights Hotline (Manhattan, KS)

== See also ==
- List of anti-war organizations
