= Maximilian of Tebessa =

3rd-century saint and conscientious objector

Saint Maximilian of Tebessa

Martyr
- Born: 274
- Died: 12 March 295; Theveste (Tébessa), Numidia (present day Algeria)
- Feast: 12 March
- Patronage: Conscientious objectors

Maximilian of Tebessa (Theveste), also known as Maximilian of Numidia, (Latin: Maximilianus; AD 274–295) was a Christian saint and martyr, whose feast day is observed on 12 March. Born in AD 274, the son of Fabius Victor, an official connected to the Roman army, Maximilian was obliged to enlist at the age of 21. He is noted as the earliest recorded conscientious objector, although it is believed that other Christians at the time also refused military service and were executed.

== History ==
The Acta Maximiliani was probably written sometime before 313.

Maximilianus, born about AD 274, was a native of Theveste (today Tébessa) in eastern Numidia (corresponding to the eastern part of modern Algeria) already annexed by Rome for four centuries. His father, a Christian named Fabius Victor, was a former soldier enlisted in the Roman army. On 12 March 295 at Theveste (now Tébessa, Algeria), he was brought before the proconsul of Africa Proconsularis, Cassius Dio, to swear allegiance to the Emperor as a soldier. He refused, stating that, as a Christian, he could not serve in the military, leading to his immediate beheading by sword.

== Posterity ==
Holy Roman Emperor Maximilian I was named after him.

The Order of Maximilian, a group of American clergy opposed to the Vietnam War in the 1970s, took their name from him. Maximilian's name has been regularly read out, as a representative conscientious objector from the Roman Empire, at the annual ceremony marking International Conscientious Objectors' Day, 15 May, at the Conscientious Objectors Commemorative Stone, Tavistock Square, Bloomsbury, London.
