= Troops Out Now Coalition =

The Troops Out Now Coalition (TONC) is a United States anti-war organization, which describes itself as "a national grassroots coalition of antiwar activists, trade unionists, solidarity activists and community organizers." Closely associated with the revolutionary communist Workers World Party, TONC was founded on December 3, 2004, upon the decision of A.N.S.W.E.R. to disassociate itself from the International Action Center and to align itself with the Party for Socialism and Liberation.

TONC called for its first action, a national day of protest, on March 19, 2005, the anniversary of the 2003 invasion of Iraq, which included a march from Harlem's Marcus Garvey Park to Central Park, in addition to dozens of local activities across the country.

In March 2007, TONC organized an "Encampment to Stop the War" on the National Mall, directly in front of the Capitol as Congress was meeting to vote on continuing to fund the war in Iraq.

TONC's primary purpose is opposition to the U.S.-led occupation of Iraq, but it also calls for withdrawal from Afghanistan, the liberation of Palestine and Haiti, and the removal of sanctions on Cuba. It also opposes racism and poverty within the United States, for example that demonstrated by the lack of response to Hurricane Katrina. It considers itself not simply anti-war, but anti-imperialist.

== See also ==
- List of anti-war organizations
