= Mayday Books =

Coordinates: 44.97098°N 93.24697°W

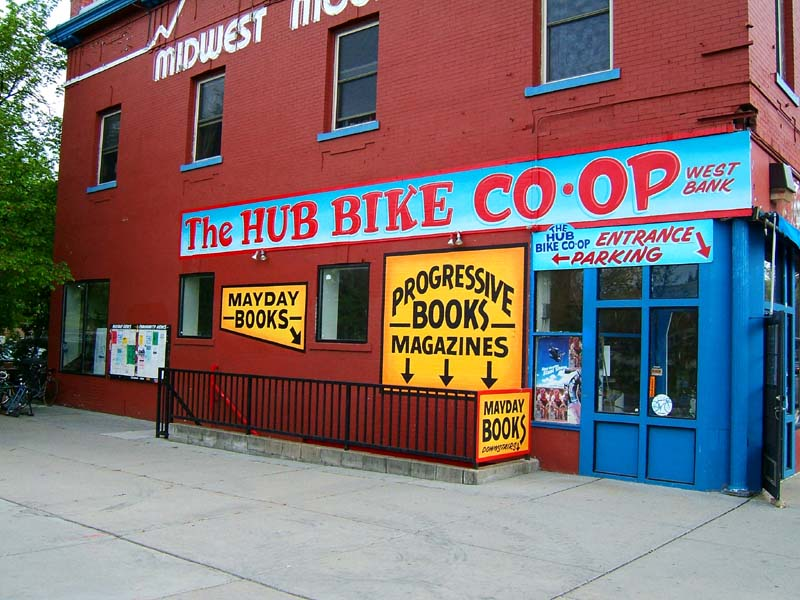
- Company type: Non-profit collective
- Industry: Retail
- Founded: 1975 (Minneapolis, Minnesota)
- Headquarters: 301 Cedar Avenue; Minneapolis, MN 55454
- Products: Books
- Website: maydaybookstore.org

Mayday Books is a volunteer-run, non-profit collective bookstore in Minneapolis, Minnesota. Established in 1975, its organizational mission is to provide leftist political books and magazines and a space for political organizing for the Minneapolis/Saint Paul metropolitan area. Mayday Books carries a selection of new and used political books, magazines, zines, T-shirts, postcards, and select CDs and DVDs.

Numerous political organizations use the collective's space for their public meetings. The collective regularly hosts author readings, film screenings, political discussions, organizational meetings, and occasional celebrations. Among the many prominent activist groups that meet at Mayday Books, the Iraq Peace Action Coalition (IPAC) meets in the store space, where in 2008 it planned the permitted anti-war march against the Republican National Convention on September 1, 2008.

== History ==
Mayday Books was founded in 1975 on the corner of Selby and Western in St. Paul, Minnesota. By 1980 Mayday had moved to Franklin and Chicago in Minneapolis, Minnesota. Eventually, in the early 1990s, internal differences over store organization and political program resulted in a split with the breakaway group forming Arise Bookstore. Subsequently, in 1991, Mayday moved to its present location on Cedar Avenue in the West Bank neighborhood of Minneapolis.
