= Orange County Student Alliance =

The Orange County Student Alliance (OCSA) was an alliance of undergraduate, graduate and high school students in Orange County, California. Headquartered at Chapman University, it became one of the, if not 'the', largest student anti-war organizations in the United States.

== History ==
About a year after September 11 attacks, when the Patriot Act was coming into full force and the United States was on the road to war with Iraq, students at Chapman University began efforts to bring together anti-war, progressive and leftist students and groups from high schools, community colleges and universities across Orange County into one larger alliance. Ultimately, OCSA had representation from Chapman University, the University of California, Irvine, Orange Coast College, Saddleback College, Cal State Fullerton, and a number of other colleges and high schools.

== See also ==
- List of anti-war organizations

== News links ==
- Minaya, Zeke (April 6, 2003), "Chapman Seniors Stand Proudly Behind Their Flags", The Los Angeles Times, p. Metro 20
