= Center on Conscience & War =

American pacifist non-profit organization

The Center on Conscience & War (CCW), formerly the National Council for Religious Conscientious Objectors and the National Interreligious Service Board for Conscientious Objectors, is a United States non-profit anti-war organization located in Washington, D.C., dedicated to defending and extending the rights of conscientious objectors.

== History ==
The group was organized as National Council for Religious Conscientious Objectors on October 5, 1940, by the three historic peace churches in response to the Selective Training and Service Act of 1940, which introduced the first peacetime draft in the United States. The Selective Service Act provided for work of national importance and an alternative to military service for conscientious objectors. The immediate task of this group was to advise conscientious objectors and create a structure for the proposed alternative service. On November 26, 1940, National Council for Religious Conscientious Objectors was merged with a similar organization, Civilian Service Board, to become National Service Board for Religious Objectors (NSBRO).

In the following months additional groups became interested in the work of NSBRO and positions on the governing board was expanded to include representatives from the Fellowship of Reconciliation, Fellowship of Peace of the Methodist Church, Disciples of Christ and Federal Council of Churches of Christ in America. During this first year a total of fifteen groups became members of NSBRO and by the end of the war this number grew to thirty nine.

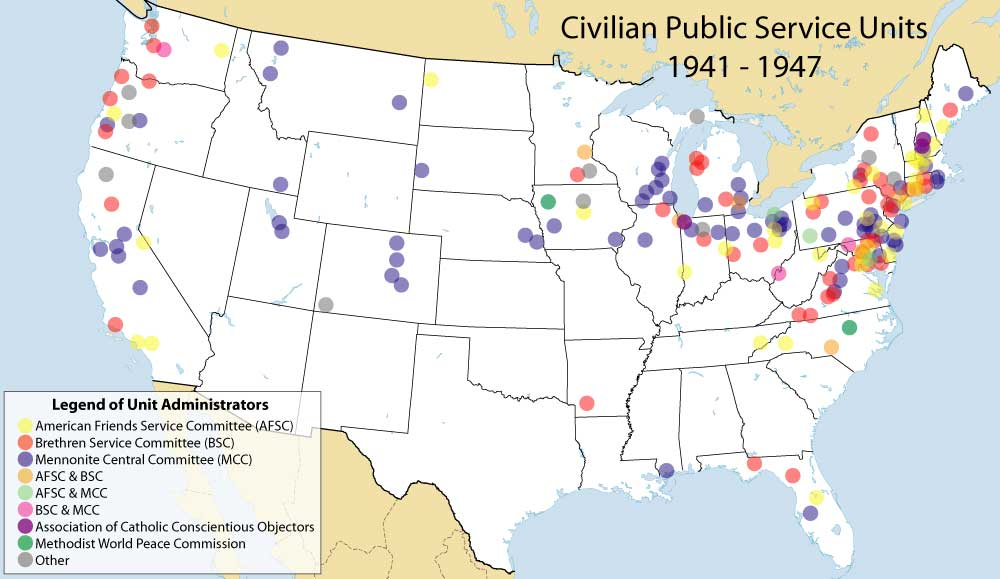
NSBRO was responsible for 150 Civilian Public Service camps during World War II.

During its first year, 3000 conscientious objectors were referred to NSBRO by Selective Service. In all, nearly 12,000 World War II COs would be handled by NSBRO. The program for conscientious objectors, Civilian Public Service (CPS), was under civilian control with NSBRO responsible for working with the government and representing the interests of the churches and other groups involved.

The work of NSBRO was divided into three sections. The Camp Section selected sites, often former Civilian Conservation Corps facilities, for use as CPS base camps, The Assignment Section matched men with camps and units, keeping detailed records of the assignments and projects. The Complaint Section worked with cases of men who were denied conscientious objector status. Later an Advisory Section was created to track the changes in Selective Service regulations and interpret them to NSBRO constituency. Regular contact was made with COs who chose prison over CPS.

Conscientious objectors were required to serve into 1947, past the end of the war. Member groups who disagreed with this policy or the cooperation required with a system of conscription began to withdraw from the organization. War Resisters League pulled out early in the war, followed by Fellowship of Reconciliation, American Friends Service Committee, and Association of Catholic Conscientious Objectors. The last CPS camp closed in April 1947, completing this phase of NSBRO work.

In 1964 the name was changed to National Interreligious Service Board for Conscientious Objectors (NISBCO), and in 2000 it became Center on Conscience & War (CCW).

Today, the work of the Center on Conscience & War is mainly with members of the US military who experience a crisis of conscience and seek discharge as conscientious objectors. CCW also provides technical and community support to other conscientious objectors, including immigrants seeking citizenship in the US who are moved by conscience to take an alternative oath of citizenship that does not include a promise to bear arms, and youth facing Selective Service (draft) registration.

The group participates in the GI Rights Hotline, and works against all forms of conscription. There are no charges for any of CCW's services.

== See also ==
- List of anti-war organizations
- List of peace activists
