= Sidney Hinkes =

Sidney George Stuart Hinkes (1925–2006) was a British pacifist and a priest in the Church of England.

Hinkes was born in Dagenham. His father was a postal sorter at the London Sorting office. He was educated at Dagenham County School from 1936 and was evacuated to Ilfracombe during the Second World War. He went on to serve with the 6th Airborne Division in the Ardennes and the Rhine from 1943. He married his wife, Elsie, in 1945 and was ordained in 1952.

Hinkes became a peace campaigner and committed pacifist during the 1956 Suez War and was involved in the first Aldermaston March in 1958. His association with CND grew and he became chair of Christian CND in 1964. After moving to Oxford in the 1960s, Hinkes became involved in issues of race relations and chaired the Oxford Community Relations Council. He later served on the national executive of the Joint Council for the Welfare of Immigrants. He was later involved in opposition to the 2003 Iraq War and was an active member of the Stop the War Coalition and the Anglican Pacifist Fellowship.

== See also ==
- List of peace activists
