= Long Island Alliance for Peaceful Alternatives =

Long Island Alliance for Peaceful Alternatives is a non-profit organization founded in 1985 to provide educational programs on peace and national security issues and to promote dialogue on the role and responsibility of citizens in determining national priorities and policies. The organization is located in Garden City, New York.

== See also ==
- List of anti-war organizations
- List of peace activists
