= Delàs Center for Peace Studies =

Organization researching demilitarization

The Delàs Center for Peace Studies (generally known as Centre Delàs) is an independent body involved in analyzing issues like peace, security, defense and disarmament, founded in 1999. First it was linked to Justícia i Pau (Justice and Peace) in Girona, Spain. The center was named after Josep Manuel Delàs, a Catalan military, social activist and pacifist, and chairman of Justícia i Pau. Before settling in Girona, Josep Manuel Delàs was commander of the reserve army and a member of the UMD (Unión Militar Democràtica). Josep Manuel Delàs had been linked to Justícia i Pau from the end of the 1980s until his death in 1999, and president from 1989 to 1995.

The main mission of the center is to carry out research on the economic, social, political and humanitarian impacts of militarism and armed conflicts through a peace culture angle, and the construction of a disarmed society.

The Delàs Center is organized through a working group of researchers which analyze current affairs related to peace, war and security. The organization also takes part in campaigns, organizes conferences and seminars and does advocacy work directed at raising awareness on peace-related issues.

== Research ==
The Delàs Centre has published 54 reports about issues ranging from arms financed by banks, to military spending or arms trade, normally within the framework of the military economic cycle.

The center has also worked alongside Amnesty International and the European Center for Constitutional and Human Rights (ECCHR), for the report “Spanish Arms Exports and Alleged War Crimes in Yemen”. This report revealed new proof on how the Spanish company Airbus Defence and Space S.A. is involved in the arm export to Saudi Arabia, and the UAE.

Published books: Mentes Militarizadas, Políticas Alternativas de Seguridad.

== Campaigns ==
Centre Delàs leads campaigns such as:

- GCOMS, a campaign which organizes the Global Day of Action on Military Spending (GDAMS) to bring the public, the media and political attention to the costs of military spending and the need to invest in new priorities. More than 100 organizations from 35 countries have joined the campaign.
- Banca armada: its aim is to bring out in the open the Financial instiruions which participate to the production of arms, industries which have dangerous consequences on their people and the cities they live in.

The centre is also an active member of campaigns such as ICAN, Stop Killer Robots or Desmilitaritzem l’educació.

== Documentaries ==
In 2013, the Centre Deals was part of the filming of a documentary called ‘Ahimsa’. The documentary's aim was to analyze the causes which provoke wars, to highlight the actors involved, and understand the role citizens play. Moreover, in 2018, the center has also been part of the creation of the documentary ‘Els fils del tauler’ (the board wires). The documentary explores the causes and the consequences of wars, through the gaze of victims, and points out the responsibilities of organized mass violence: the military industrial complex.

== Prizes ==
In 2021, the center won the Desalambre prize for best NGO research for its report 'Financiación de las armas de la guerra de Yemen' (Financing of weapons of the Yemen war). This analysis focused on the arms companies which exported weapons to Saudi Arabia and the United Arab Emirates. Furthermore, in that same year, the center won the Vicent Martínez Guzmán peace prize in recognition of their research work for peace, awarded by the city of Castellón (Valencian Community).

== Membership and network ==
The Delàs Center for Peace Studies, is a member of the Spanish Association of Research for Peace (AIPAZ) and both the Catalan and Valencian NGOs federations (Fede.cat and CVONGD respectively).

Moreover, it is part of the European Network Against Arms Trade (EENAAT), the War Resisters’ International (WRI), the International Peace Bureau, the International Campaign to abolish Nuclear Weapons (ICAN), the Cluster Munition Coalition, the Campaign to Stop Killer Robots, the International Network on Explosive Weapons (INEW) and the International Action Network on Small Arms (IANSA).
