= National Coordinating Committee to End the War in Vietnam =

The National Coordinating Committee to End the War in Vietnam was a US activist group that became an umbrella anti-Vietnam war group. Members of this group convinced Senator Eugene McCarthy to run in the primaries against Lyndon B. Johnson as an anti-war primary candidate.

== See also ==
- List of anti-war organizations
- List of peace activists
- National Mobilization Committee to End the War in Vietnam
