= Episcopal Peace Fellowship =

American peace organization

- Abbreviation: EPF
- Formation: November 11, 1939; 86 years ago
- Founded at: New York City, New York, US
- Executive Director: Melanie Merkle Atha
- Chair: Jackie Lynn
- Website: epfnational.org
- Formerly called: Episcopal Pacifist Fellowship

The Episcopal Peace Fellowship (EPF) is an American peace organization composed of members of the Episcopal Church.

It has EIN 20-0351555 as a 501(c)(3) Public Charity; in 2024 it reported total revenue of $93,804 and total assets of $181,965.

== History ==
It was founded in New York City on November 11, 1939, as the Episcopal Pacifist Fellowship by John Nevin Sayre, Walter Russell Bowie, Elmore McKee, Eric M. Tasman, Luke White, Katharine Pierce, William Appleton Lawrence, Walter Mitchell, and Paul Jones with the mission to pray, study and work for peace. It adopted its current name in 1965.

The EPF has a national office with a small paid staff, and many local chapters (71 as of January 2009). It urges the broader Episcopal Church, other organizations and people in general to adopt a more peaceful stance on issues such as the Iraq War, Iran, promoting peace in the broader Middle East, nuclear weapons, and Cuba. It offers Active Nonviolence Training, takes part in peace demonstrations, helps organize action groups, and awards peace prizes to individuals around the world who strive for peace.

It is a sister organization of the Anglican Pacifist Fellowship.

== See also ==
- List of anti-war organizations
