= Iraq Peace Action Coalition =

The Iraq Peace Action Coalition (IPAC) is an antiwar organization based in Minneapolis, Minnesota. The coalition was created in order to coordinate activities by local activists in opposition to the U.S. war against Iraq. IPAC also sponsors protests against escalations of the war in Afghanistan. IPAC meets regularly at Mayday Books in Minneapolis.

IPAC has initiated and planned for several large mass demonstrations in the Twin Cities area.

== See also ==
- List of anti-war organizations
- List of peace activists
