= Lutheran Peace Fellowship =

Lutheran Peace Fellowship (LPF) is an organization of Lutherans who work for peace and social justice issues. It includes members and supporters in all the Lutheran denominations and more than a few people from other faith traditions. LPF is a nonprofit organization supported largely by its members as well as a variety of grants and honoraria from workshops, events, and trainings. Although not an official part of the ELCA, it has received funding from various units within that denomination.

== History and priorities ==
Founded in 1941, LPF offers a wide range of resources, workshops, support, and encouragement. LPF's main priority is to support effective peace education and advocacy by its members and local chapters, networks, and congregations. Membership is open to any individual, chapter, or congregation.

LPF periodically plays a significant role in the most pressing issues of our time. In recent years, these have included world hunger, landmines, and Senate ratification of the Chemical Weapons Treaty. In 1999, LPF's national coordinator served as the U.S. delegate to meetings in India to help plan the UN Decade for Peace, the largest peace education program in UN history. LPF's top advocacy priorities have included challenging militarism, ending hunger and extreme poverty, federal budget priorities, opposing war and militarism, climate change, the Israeli–Palestinian conflict, youth and military service, nuclear weapons, and gender, race and economic justice.

Lutheran Peace Fellowship's leaders facilitate as many as 80 workshops and leadership trainings a year. Popular topics for LPF workshops include Current Advocacy Priorities, Biblical Peacemaking, Nonviolence for a Violent World, Leadership Training in Peacemaking, and How to Be a Bridge in a World Full of Walls.

LPF has written many highly regarded peace education and workshop resources. For example, it is currently updating one of its computer-based education activities, two of which were included in one of the largest critical thinking programs in U.S. public education. Its eleven "PeacePoints" leaders' guides have been used to present over 1600 education forums and workshop sessions.

The international LPF headquarters are located in Seattle, Washington, and there are local chapters and networks in many parts of the U.S.

== See also ==
- List of anti-war organizations
