= Order of Maximilian =

Former anti-war group

The Order of Maximilian was an anti-war group active during the Vietnam War, composed of a community of priests and clergymen. The group took its name from the third-century Roman saint Maximilian of Tebessa,(Latin: Maximilianus) who was martyred in AD 295 for refusing to be conscripted. In the present day, Maximilian's followers visit military posts, invaded prison camps and strongholds as a spiritual counselor to recruit Military priests and hold services of worship in honor of the saint itself.

== See also ==
- List of anti-war organizations
