= Modern-war pacifism =

Position that modern war can never be morally justified

Modern-war pacifism, sometimes known as "just-war pacifism" or "nuclear pacifism" is a moral position that holds that modern war can never be morally justified. It is distinct however from other forms of pacifism in that it recognizes that, in certain historical contexts, wars might have been capable of being justified, and thus it presupposes the validity of the just war theory. In the view of modern-war pacifism, the destructive potential of modern (especially nuclear) weapons makes it presumptively impossible for any modern war to meet the proportionality criterion of the just war theory.
