= Minds of Peace =

Nonprofit peace organization in Israel and Palestine

Minds of Peace (Hebrew: מחשבות של שלום) is a nonprofit organization in Israel and Palestine with the aim of promoting agreements between the leaders of the nations by advocating and arranging public congresses in which ordinary Israelis and Palestinians negotiate a peace deal.

The organization was founded in 2009 and is led by the founder Sapir Hendelman.

Past congresses were covered by Israeli Public Broadcasting Corporation and the BBC.

== Weblinks ==
- Homepage of Minds of Peace
- Sapir Hendelman at ResearchGate
