= Christian CND =

Christian CND (CCND) is a 'Specialist Section' of CND, the Campaign for Nuclear Disarmament and has existed since 1960. CCND is made up of individual Christians of various denominations who oppose nuclear weapons and who campaign for peace. The organisation has an elected executive of ten members and publishes a journal called 'Ploughshare' twice a year. It also holds online prayer meetings and the occasional pilgrimage. It attends wider CND events and other events across the peace movement. Its symbol combines the original CND sign (commonly referred to as the 'Peace' sign) with images of a cross and a dove holding an olive branch.

Christian CND is a member of the Network of Christian Peace Organisations.

NOTE. College CND also used the abbreviation CCND.

== History ==
Founded in 1960, chaired by Sidney Hinkes from 1964.

In 1981 it was expanded and reorganised on a more permanent basis with its own membership, newsletter and administration, and considerable autonomy in forming its own policies. It organised many conferences at local and national level as well as acts of protest, liturgies and services at bases and government sites. Its members were also involved in letter writing, lobbying and educating for peace and disarmament. There were also several Christian CND local groups around the UK.
