= World March for Peace and Nonviolence =

Awareness March for nonviolence

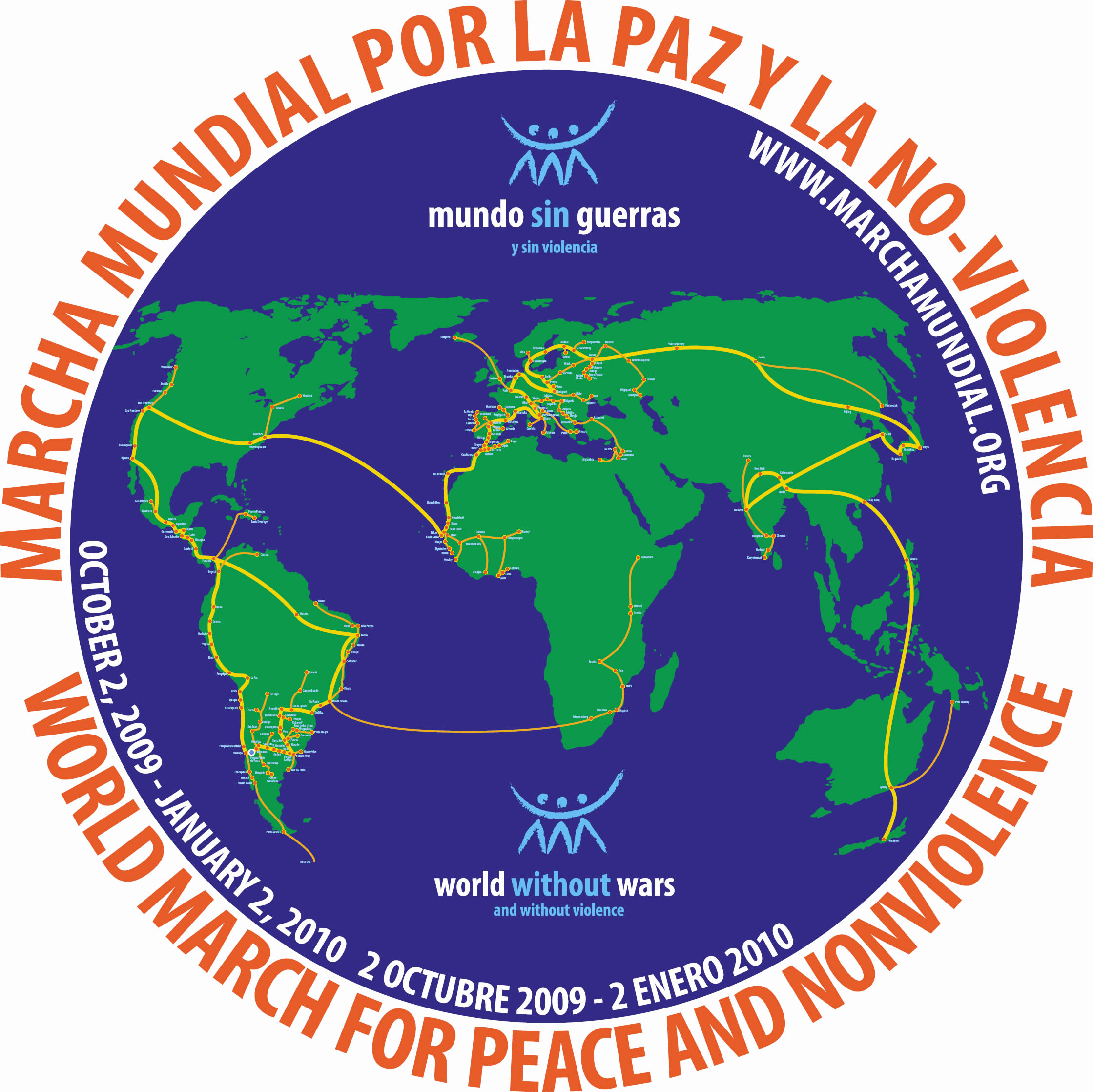
Logo of World March for Peace and Nonviolence

The World March for Peace and Nonviolence is an initiative of World without Wars, an international organization which has worked for peace and nonviolence since 1995 and was created by the Humanist Movement.

The project of the World March was launched in 2008.

The March started October 2 (Gandhi's birthday), 2009 in Wellington, New Zealand and finished on January 2, 2010 in Punta de Vacas, Mendoza, Argentina. The March was intended to rise worldwide awareness for nonviolence. Concrete demands of the March are: abolition of nuclear weapons; withdrawal of invading troops from occupied territories; the progressive and proportional reduction of conventional weapons; the signing of non-aggression treaties among nations and the renunciation by governments of war as a way to resolve conflicts.

The World March for Peace and Nonviolence includes millions of individuals, on six continents in 90 countries, traveling some 160,000 kilometers.

A second March was held on October 2, 2019 in Madrid and circles back to the same location and finished on March 8, 2020.

== Demands put forward by world march ==
- Nuclear disarmament at a global level.
- The immediate withdrawal of invading troops from occupied territories.
- The progressive and proportional reduction of conventional weapons.
- The signing of non-aggression treaties between countries.
- The renunciation by governments of the use of war as a means to resolve conflicts.

== Notable endorsers ==
One of the key strategies to promote the March is to receive endorsements from personalities and organizations in a variety of fields.

- Michelle Bachelet, President of Chile
