= Punta de Vacas =

- Hamlet
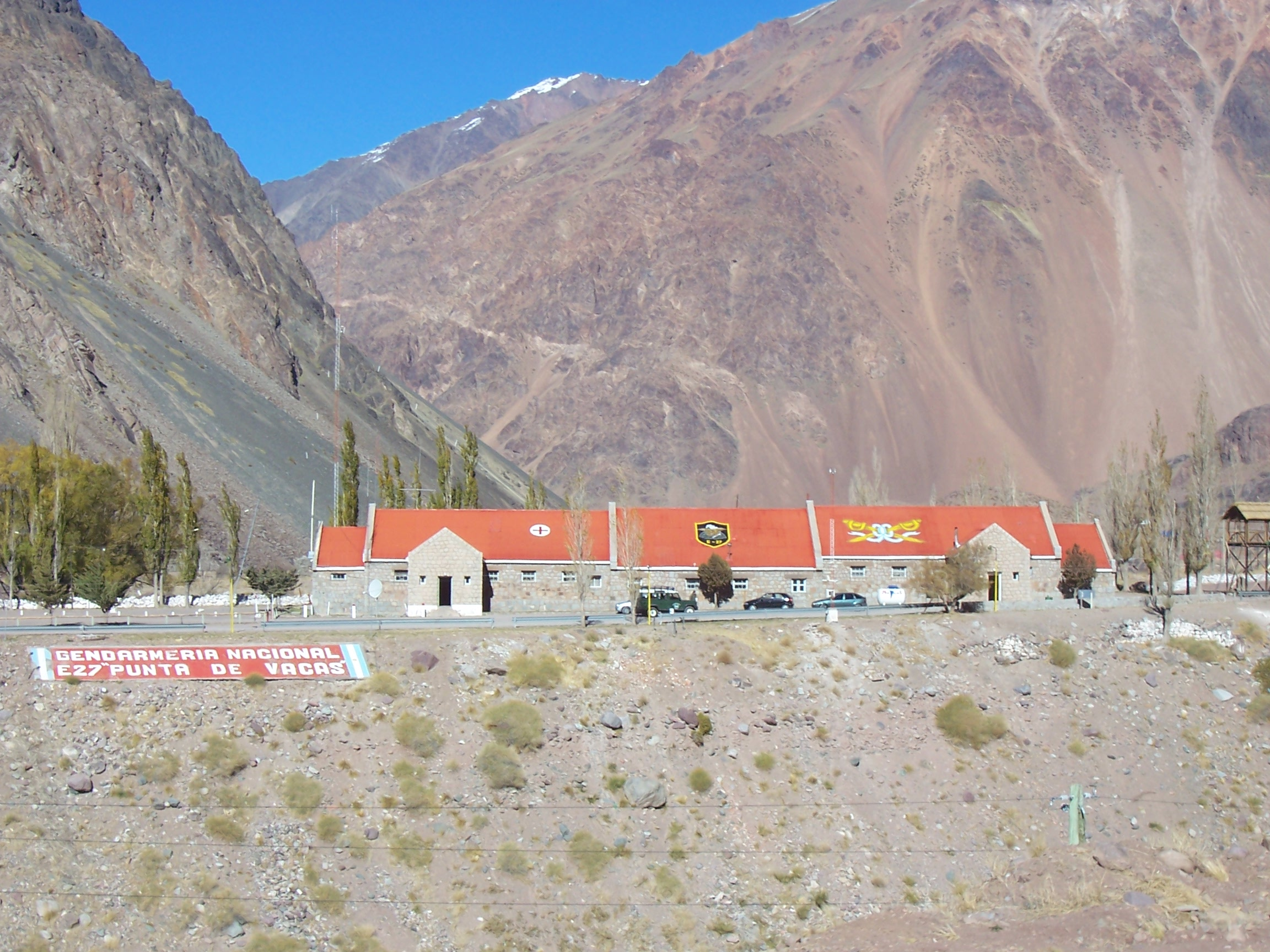
- National Gendarmerie in Punta de Vacas

- Location of Punta de Vacas in Argentina
- Coordinates: 32°51′S 69°45′W
- Country: Argentina
- Province: Mendoza
- Department: Las Heras
- Elevation: 2,980 m (9,780 ft)

Population
  - Total: 47
- Time zone: UTC−3 (ART)
- CPA base: M5553
- Dialing code: +54 261

Punta De Vacas, meaning "cows point", is a hamlet in Mendoza Province, Argentina between Mendoza and Puente del Inca, not far from the border with Chile. The city was once served by the now disused Transandine Railway which ran from Mendoza in Argentina to Los Andes in Chile.

From there, the Tupungato mountain can be viewed. This mountain rises at 6800 meters above sea level. It constitutes one of the accesses to the Aconcagua Provincial Park and the ascension routes to the Aconcagua mountain.

== Population ==
According to the INDEC census of 2001, Punta de Vacas has a population of 47 inhabitants. In spite of its small size and reduced population, this location has gained worldwide popularity due to being the site of one of Silo's first public speeches, "The Healing of Suffering" (see Mario Rodríguez Cobos), on May 4, 1969. This site is now a Park where Silo's followers meet from time to time for study and reflection .
