= Humanist Movement =

Movement following Mario Rodríguez Cobos

The Humanist Movement is an international volunteer organisation following and spreading the ideas of Argentine writer Mario Rodríguez Cobos, commonly known by his nickname "Silo". The movement's ideology is known as New Humanism, Universal Humanism or simply Siloism.

== Siloist ideology ==
Silo said that normally, people live in a state of "inner violence" caused by human desire, which leads one to subject others to violence as well. The term "violence" as used here means not only physical violence, but also encompasses for example "economical violence", which is the exploitation of other people, and for example forcing one's way of life on other people. To heal the world's suffering, then, Silo said that each individual must go through a process of self-transformation that would calm their desire. Silo likened the state before self-transformation to sleep in a parable, and said that true liberation required self-transformation. This self-transformation is to be achieved through meditation under the guidance of those who are already liberated.

Silo warned to be doubtful of political change through reforms; in Siloist thought, all change has to start with the individual. In fact, early Siloists rejected the idea of participating in party politics, though they later revisited this and started the Humanist Party in many countries. Under the pseudonym "H. van Doren", Silo criticised then-governing communist party Popular Unity for preserving the capitalist system, instead proposing a "total revolution" led by young self-transformed people that would result in libertarian socialism, a communist society without hierarchies.

Early Siloists championed sexual liberation for both men and women equally, though only as one aspect of total liberation and not as a goal in and of itself. This included acceptance of homosexuals. Later, having formed the Humanist Party, Siloists fought for homosexual rights, as well as abortion rights and the legalisation of divorce. They also advocated for environmentalism and democratic institutions.

Siloism draws on the works of Herbert Marcuse, George Gurdjieff, Erich Fromm and Wilhelm Reich, and on the philosophy of anarchism.

== History ==
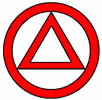
The symbol of Poder Joven

The Humanist Movement can be traced back to a group called "Poder Joven" (Young Power) that was active in Chile primarily during the Allende presidency. A crucial event was Silo's 1969 speech titled "The Healing of Suffering" at Punta de Vacas, in which he laid out his basic ideology.

Though Poder Joven was never bigger than about 300 people, it had a strong presence in Chile. The movement was not looked upon kindly by the rest of society. Both communist and right-wing media criticised Poder Joven heavily. Communist newspaper El Siglo highlighted that the movement came from the "wealthy neighborhoods" and suggested ties with fascism, while the right-wing newspaper El Mercurio suggested ties with the radical MIR. Both however attacked Poder Joven for supposed immoral behaviour, with El Siglo conflating them with hippies and El Mercurio saying its principles "fly in the face of all moral, religious, and social norms." Poder Joven members also faced harassment and threats from a group of young people called the Parra Ramona Brigade.

In 1971, six members of Poder Joven were arrested after at least 14 parents complained of kidnapping because their children had been convinced by members to run away from home and join the movement. As the supposedly kidnapped young women returned home and parents withdrew their complaints, the charges were dropped.

After the 1973 Chilean coup d'état established a military junta, 38 Siloists were arrested, 2 of whom were kept imprisoned for nine months whereas the rest were released. During the military government's years in power, Poder Joven members were persecuted. These circumstances are part of what made Siloists spread their ideology internationally.

== The International Humanist Party ==
The Humanist Movement has set up a Humanist Party in many countries. In 1989, these political parties formed a consortium called Humanist International.

== Criticism and legal problems ==
There was an article in the Village Voice which painted the Siloist movement as a shady organisation, and their creation of the environmental party "Green Future" as an attempt to "capture the momentum of the environmental movement".

=== Criticism from ex-members ===
Some former members paint the Humanist Movement as a "cult". Ex-member JD Snyder rejects this label and expresses doubt about reports of brainwashing and humiliation.

An ex-member wrote a book under the pseudonym "Rex Voluntas" called Lies my guru told me, in which he alleges sexual assault by two fellow members while in the HM. He also published a website, ex-silo.org, which served as a collection of anti-Siloist materials.

Another critical ex-member is Bob von Holdt, who digitized various documents from within the HM, and newspaper articles about it, which were published on the ex-silo.org website as the "San Francisco Files". He also wrote a report for ex-silo.org about his experience in the HM. In that report, he says there was a strong push to recruit more members, that subtle tactics of manipulation were employed, that Silo and his words were held in extremely high regard, and that much direct communication with Silo took place.

=== Court cases ===
On behalf of the Humanist Movement in Quebec, a member sued the newspaper Voir and a specific journalist for including the HM in a list of "sects using the internet". The journalist won the case.

== Sources ==
- Barr-Melej, P. (2006). "Siloísmo and the Self in Allende's Chile: Youth, "Total Revolution," and the Roots of the Humanist Movement". Hispanic American Historical Review. 86 (4): 747–784. doi:10.1215/00182168-2006-049.
