= Global Day of Action on Military Spending =

Annual event held in April

Global Day of Action on Military Spending (GDAMS)
- Observed by: Worldwide
- Type: International
- Date: Mid-April (annually, depending on release of SIPRI data)
- Frequency: annual

Global Day of Action on Military Spending (GDAMS) takes place every year in mid-April. The day was originally proposed by the International Peace Bureau (IPB) and the Institute for Policy Studies (IPS) with the aim of promoting a common awareness of the amounts of money spent on military. Military expenses reach about $1,700 billion each year. On GDAMS groups around the world advocate a shift of budget priorities and promote spending this amount of money on human development.

== Thematic ==
Whole libraries have been written about the use of weapons in armed conflict. Far less has been said about their effects on sustainable development, which is crucial from a human security perspective.

The IPB contrasts the high levels of military spending (estimated by the Stockholm International Peace Research Institute in 2011 as being US $1,738 billion at worldwide level) against, for instance, the failure to fulfill the pledges of the Millennium Development Goals suggesting that, in general: "Research on the causes of violent conflicts shows myriad factors, but does not indicate that building bigger armies is the key to keeping a county safe from warfare. In fact, funds spent on weapons may drain resources from social, political, and economic development that may address root causes of conflict." The amount of money spent on the defense sector equals $4.7 billion a day or $249 per person. According to the World Bank and the Office of Disarmament Affairs (ODA), only about 5% of this amount would be needed each year to achieve the Millennium Development Goals by 2015.

The negative effects of high militarization include not just the direct ones of money and resources being spent on weapons systems instead of being used for human development but also the associated costs of negative health consequences of research, development, testing and even the safe decommissioning of such weapons, especially nuclear, biological and chemical ones.

As is obvious, the greater the military expenditure, the less there is left to spend on other aspects, both at communal but also at individual level, such as building and maintaining infrastructure, education and health.

In the words of Dwight D. Eisenhower: "Every gun that is made, every warship launched, every rocket fired signifies, in the final sense, a theft from those who hunger and are not fed".

== See also ==
- Pacifism
- Direct action
- Nonviolence
- Global Peace Index
- Human Development Index
- University for Peace
- Peace movement
- List of countries by military expenditures
- List of countries without armed forces
