= Chacras de Coria =

- Location in Argentina
- Coordinates: 32°59′00″S 68°52′40″W
- Country: Argentina
- Province: Mendoza
- Department: Luján de Cuyo
- Elevation: 902 m (2,959 ft)

Population (2001)
  - Total: 5,600
- Time zone: UTC−3 (ART)
- Postal Code: M5664
- Climate: BWk

Chacras de Coria is a small town located in an oasis in the north of the province of Mendoza, Argentina, a few kilometers from the capital city.

Due to its characteristics of a micro-climate during summer months, the area is popular for recreation. It relies on tourism generated through its wineries and museums, things which have turned it into a busy hotspot for food, with lots of variety.
