= Counter-recruitment =

Activity opposing military recruitment

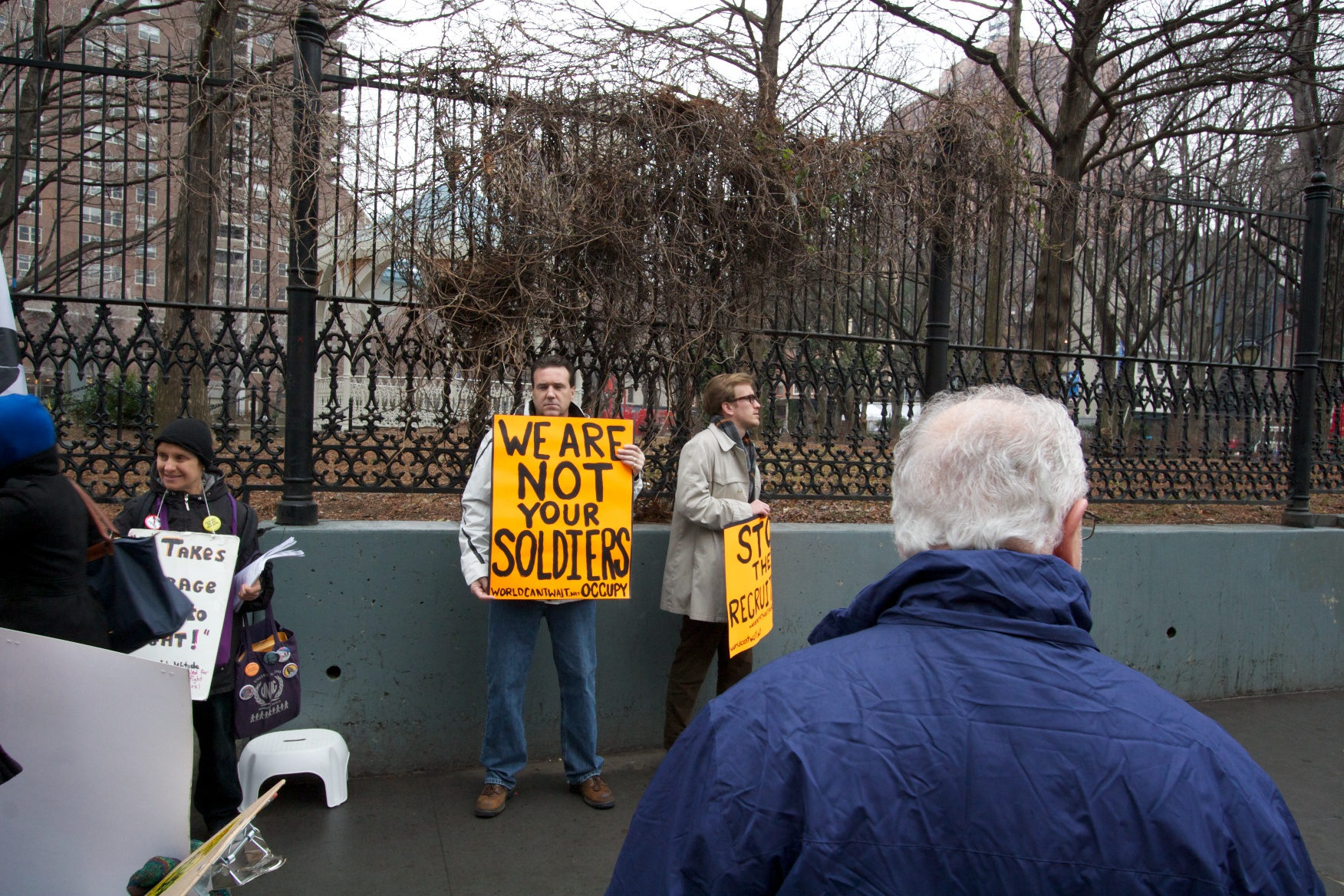
"We are Not Soldiers" on sign during Occupy Movement Protest

Counter-recruitment refers to activity that engages in opposing military recruitment, in some or all of its forms. Among the methods used are research, consciousness-raising, political advocacy and direct action. Most such activity is a response to recruitment by state armed forces, but may also target intelligence agencies, private military companies, and non-state armed groups.

== Rationale ==
Counter-recruitment poster.

The evidence that currently exists on what the rationale is for counter-recruitment activity may be based on any of the following reasons:

- The view that war is immoral - see pacifism.
- The view that some military organizations are a tool of imperialism - see anti-imperialism.
- Evidence from Australia, Canada, France, the UK, and the US that abusive behaviour such as bullying, racism, sexism and sexual violence, and homophobia are common in military organizations. See, for example, Women in the military and Sexual orientation and gender identity in military service.
- Evidence from the UK and US that military training and military employment lead to higher rates of mental health and behavioural problems than are usually found in civilian life, specifically after they have left the armed forces.
- Evidence from Germany, Israel, the UK, and the US that recruiting practices justify, glorify, or water-down war, the harm it produces, role of military personnel in war, and obscure the risks and obligations of military employment, which misleads potential recruits, particularly adolescents from socio-economically deprived backgrounds.
- Evidence from Germany, the UK, and the US that recruiters target, and capitalise on the precarious position of socio-economically deprived young people as potential recruits.
- The fact that some armed forces rely on children aged 16 or 17 to fill their ranks, and evidence from Australia, Israel, the UK and from the Vietnam era in the US that these youngest recruits are most likely to be adversely affected by the demands and risks of military life.

Armed forces spokespeople have defended the status quo by recourse to the following:

- The view that military organizations provide a valuable public service.
- Anecdotal evidence that military employment benefits young people.
- The view that duty of care policies protect recruits from harm.

== Activity ==
Examples of counter-recruitment activity are:

- Research and analysis of military recruitment practices, and of the effects and outcomes of military employment.
- Legal advocacy (aimed at changing legislation) and political advocacy (aimed at changing policy) to regulate or limit the scope of military recruitment.
- Consciousness-raising to raise awareness and concern about military recruitment practices and the effects of military training and employment.
- Providing information to potential recruits about the risks and obligations of enlistment, or discouraging enlistment.
- Satirising the propagandistic glorification of military personnel.

== In the United States ==
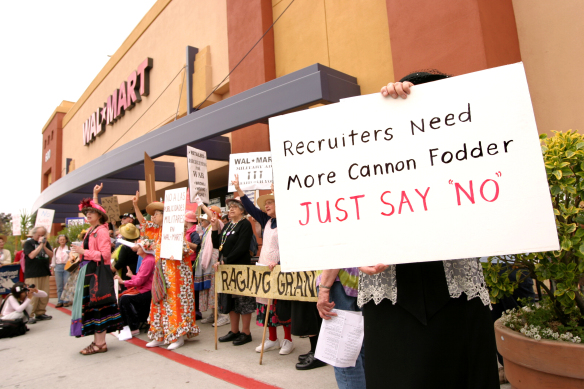
Counter-recruiting by Raging Grannies in California in 2005

Counter-recruitment (which has long been a strategy of pacifist and other anti-war groups) received a boost in the United States with the unpopularity of the war in Iraq and brief recruitment difficulties of branches of the U.S. military, particularly the Army; although the Army has met, or exceeded, its recruitment goals year after year during that period. Beginning in early 2005, the U.S. counter-recruitment movement grew, particularly on high school and college campuses, where it is often led by students who see themselves as targeted for military service in a war they do not support.

=== Early history ===
The counter-recruitment movement was the successor to the anti-draft movement with the end of conscription in the United States in 1973, just after the end of the Vietnam War. The military increased its recruiting efforts, with the total number of recruiters, recruiting stations, and dollars spent on recruiting each more than doubling between 1971 and 1974. Anti-war movements and anti-draft activists responded with a number of initiatives, using tactics similar to those used by counter-recruiters today. Activists distributed leaflets to students, publicly debated recruiters, and used equal-access provisions to obtain space next to recruiters to dispute their claims. The American Friends Service Committee (A.F.S.C.) and the Central Committee for Conscientious Objectors (C.C.C.O.) began publishing counter-recruitment literature and attempting to coordinate the movement nationally. These organizations have been continuously involved in counter-recruitment to the present day.

=== Criticisms of military recruitment ===
Counter-recruitment activists and scholars argue that the U.S. government targets low-income, Black, and Brown youth for recruitment in the U.S. military. The 2001 No Child Left Behind Act allowed recruiters access to school campuses nationwide. Such access encourages the "predatory" recruitment that concern many PTAs, teachers, and others. Hagopian and Barker note the following "predatory behavior" encouraged in the U.S. Army's handbook of the School's Recruiting Program (SRP):

"Be so helpful and so much a part of the school scene that you are in constant demand. Attend athletic events at the HS [high school]. Deliver donuts and coffee for the faculty once a month. Offer to be a timekeeper at football games. [And, in a particularly cynical gesture, given Martin Luther King's views on war and militarism] Martin Luther King, Jr.'s birthday is in January. Wear your dress blues and participate in school events commemorating this holiday.(p2,5-6)"

Hagopian and Barker explain how the behavior of military recruiters on high school campuses mirrors what child psychologist's describe as "grooming" or "predatory". Predatory groomers, they point out, tend to be "exceptionally charming and/or helpful" while "failing to honor clear boundaries.".

=== High schools ===
Most counter-recruitment work in the U.S. is focused at the policy level of public school systems. This work is generally done by parents and grandparents of school-aged children, and the most common activity is information and advocacy with school officials (principals, school boards, etc.) and with the general population in their local school area. CR at the K12 level is categorically different from other movements, since most of the students are underaged minors and parents are their legal custodians and guardians, not the schools.

The most common policy goal is that the frequency of military recruiters' visits to public schools, their locations in schools, and their types of activities be controlled rather than unlimited. Many of the larger urban school districts have implemented such guidelines since 2001.

Other goals have included "truth in recruiting", that counselors or curriculum elements be implemented to address the deficiency in high school students' understanding of war and the military life, rather than allowing military recruiters to perform that role.

On high school campuses, counter-recruitment activists since 2001 have also focused around a provision of the No Child Left Behind Act, which requires that high schools provide contact and other information to the military for all of their students who do not opt out.

Counter-recruitment campaigns have attempted to change school policy to ban recruiters regardless of the loss of federal funds, to be active about informing students of their ability to opt out, and/or to allow counter-recruiters access to students equal to the access given to military recruiters. These political campaigns have had some success, particularly in the Los Angeles area, where one has been led by the Coalition Against Militarism in Our Schools, and the San Francisco Bay Area. A simpler and easier, though perhaps less effective, strategy by counter-recruiters has been to show up before or after the school day and provide students entering or exiting their school with opt-out forms, produced by the local school district or by a sympathetic national legal organization such as the American Civil Liberties Union or the National Lawyers Guild.

=== Organizations in Counter-Recruitment ===
Organizations which have attempted to organize such campaigns on a national scale include A.F.S.C. and C.C.C.O., the Campus Antiwar Network (C.A.N.), and the War Resisters League. Code Pink, with the Ruckus Society, has sponsored training camps on counter-recruitment as well as producing informational literature for use by counter-recruiters. United for Peace and Justice has counter-recruitment as one of its seven issue-specific campaigns. Mennonite Central Committee is another resource on the subject. Some of these organizations focus on counter-recruitment in a specific sector, such as high schools or colleges, while the National network Opposing the Militarization of Youth, founded in 2004, deals with the larger issue of militarism as it affects young people and society.

Organizations in the Bay Area such as Better Alternatives for Youth (BAY-Peace) emerged in 2007, responding to "predatory" recruitment with the goal of providing political education to disadvantaged and marginalized youth to counteract the military's recruitment efforts. Counter-recruitment methods exist nationwide, and BAY-Peace is just one example. Organizations and movements included in counter-recruitment, specifically BAY-peace, provide a focused community-lens that allows for care specific to the East Bay Youth community. They emerged from the "truth in recruiting" movement that began in Oakland around 2001, shortly after the No Child Left Behind Act (2001). The BAY-Peace website explains how they are centered around offering, "holistic youth leadership programs where we empower Bay Area youth to transform and heal from militarism, systemic violence and intergenerational trauma," with a specific emphasis on protecting their youth from "aggressive military recruitment" that targets low-income youth of color. Their programs include a student-led, community-centered, and youth-empowerment approach where they motivate students themselves to lead workshops, organize protests, and engage with their own communities.

=== The Serve Act ===
Currently, the United States is experiencing a military recruitment crisis. The Serve Act has emerged as a potential solution. The National Network Opposing Militarization of Youth (NNOMY) explains how they are, "facing 'the most challenging recruitment environment in 50 years,' driven by a shrinking eligible population, a strong economy, and declining trust in institutions among Generation Z."

NNOMY argues that the newly emerging SERVE Act aims to normalize and ingrain military contact and engagement with youth and school students "as early as possible" in order to frame military enlistment as a "a civic expectation". NNOMY argues that the SERVE Act is an attempt at preventing families, communities, and activists in engaging in counter-recruitment methods which could shield youth from "aggressive recruitment tactics". The SERVE Act allows the federal government to pressure school districts to implement policies that engage in military recruitment through "actively facilitating outreach." It allows the military to have direct access to student directories, enabling surveillance and allowing the military to make repeated direct contact with individual students.

== In Canada ==
In response to the Canadian Forces' role as a member of the International Security Assistance Force in Afghanistan, an anti-war movement developed in Canada which has tried to utilize counter-recruitment as a part of its efforts. In particular, Operation Objection emerged as the umbrella counter-recruitment campaign in Canada. Operation Objection claimed to have active counter-recruitment operations in 8 to 10 Canadian cities. However, coordinated attempts at counter-recruitment activism in Canada have been fairly limited as of late, and for the most part, unsuccessful.

In the 2005–06 academic year at York University, the York Federation of Students, a federation representing ten of the university's student unions, clashed with a Canadian Forces recruiter forcibly removing the recruiter and the kiosk from the Student Center. York University maintains that the Canadian Forces have the same right to recruit as any other employer participating in career fairs on campus.

On October 25, 2007, an attempt by the student union at the University of Victoria to ban Canadian Forces from participating in career fairs on campus failed when the student body voted overwhelmingly in favour of allowing the Canadian military to participate in recruitment and career development activities available to students. Approximately 500 students, five times the usual attendance, appeared at the Annual General Meeting of the University of Victoria Students' Society (UVSS), and voted to defeat the motion proposed to stop the Canadian Forces from appearing on campus at career development events, with an estimated 25 votes in favour of the ban. Those voting against the ban argued that the ban was a restriction on freedom of choice and an infringement of students' free speech, that it went beyond the mandate of student government, and that student union executives should not be advocating policy that does not reflect the views of the fee-paying student body.

In November 2007, the Minister of Education for Prince Edward Island, Gerard Greenan, was requested by the Council of Canadians to ban military recruitment on PEI campuses. The Minister responded that military service "is a career and... we think its right to let the Armed Forces have a chance to present this option to students."

== See also ==
- Antimilitarism
- Bullying in the military
- Military recruitment
- Recruit training
- Military personnel
- Women in the military
- Children in the military
- Sexual harassment in the military
- Suicide in the military
