= Laird v. Tatum =

- Supreme Court of the United States

Argued March 27, 1972 Decided June 26, 1972
- Full case name: Melvin Robert Laird, Secretary of Defense, et al. v. Tatum, et al.
- Citations: 408 U.S. 1 (more) 92 S. Ct. 2318; 33 L. Ed. 2d 154; 1972 U.S. LEXIS 25

Holding
- Respondents' claim that their First Amendment rights are chilled, due to the mere existence of this data-gathering system, are too speculative to meet Article III standing requirements.

Court membership
- Chief Justice Warren E. Burger Associate Justices William O. Douglas · William J. Brennan Jr. Potter Stewart · Byron White; Thurgood Marshall · Harry Blackmun; Lewis F. Powell Jr. · William Rehnquist

Case opinions
- Majority: Burger, joined by White, Blackmun, Powell, Rehnquist
- Dissent: Douglas, joined by Marshall
- Dissent: Brennan, joined by Stewart, Marshall

Laird v. Tatum, 408 U.S. 1 (1972), was a case in which the United States Supreme Court dismissed for lack of standing a claim in which the plaintiff accused the U.S. Army of alleged unlawful "surveillance of lawful citizen's political activity." The appellant's specific nature of the harm caused by the surveillance was that it chilled the First Amendment rights of all citizens and undermined that right to express political dissent.

== Background ==
=== Historical ===
Following the 1967 Detroit riot and the unrest after the assassination of Martin Luther King Jr., the Army concluded that it needed more comprehensive contingency planning to prepare for future domestic deployments. It therefore established an intelligence-gathering system designed to provide commanders with timely information so that, when called upon to assist civilian authorities, the Army could respond with the minimum necessary force. The Court of Appeals said the Army was "the back-up of a local police force" and needed the "same information to which local police forces have access".

The Army's post-1967 intelligence system collected information about "public activities" that "have at least some potential for civil disorder". The information was open source intelligence collected from newspapers and other publicly available publications. Additional information was gathered by Army intelligence agents observing public meetings and from civilian law enforcement agencies.

=== Legal ===
Arlo Tatum, the executive secretary of the Central Committee for Conscientious Objectors, sued Melvin Laird, the Secretary of Defense. Tatum sued after Washington Monthly published an article revealing that US military intelligence units were gathering intelligence on civilians and civil organizations in the US.

The Army maintained that it was simply lawfully collecting and maintaining intelligence concerning potential civil disturbances. The District Court dismissed the suit, finding that the plaintiffs had failed to present a justiciable controversy. The Court of Appeals reversed, holding the claim of a "chilling effect" on First Amendment rights was a justiciable controversy.

The Supreme Court granted certiorari to determine whether such an alleged chilling effect cause by the "the existence and operation of the intelligence gathering and distributing system" and not by a specific action targeting respondents individually presented a justiciable controversy.

== Opinion ==
The Court was initially divided into three camps. Justices Rehnquist and Powell initially urged the conservatives to determine that the surveillance program was constitutional. However, Chief Justice Burger along with Justices Blackmun and White determined that, 'It would be more controversial for the Court to enter into a political question.' After further reflection, Powell concluded that it was unwise to rule on the constitutionality of the surveillance program and that the issue was best decided on the principle of ripeness: That is, in the absence of a discernable injury, the issue was too speculative for the Court to rule upon. Burger eventually prevailed on Rehnquist to abandon a concurrence and join with the majority.

The Court determined that the plaintiff's claim was based on the fear that sometime in the future the Army might cause harm with information retrieved during their surveillance; and that there was no present threat. Therefore, the claim was too "speculative."

Mr. Justice Douglas wrote in dissent, with Mr. Justice Marshall concurring:

This case involves a cancer in our body politic. It is a measure of the disease which afflicts us. Army surveillance, like Army regimentation, is at war with the principles of the First Amendment. Those who already walk submissively will say there is no cause for alarm. But submissiveness is not our heritage. The First Amendment was designed to allow rebellion to remain as our heritage. The Constitution was designed to keep government off the backs of the people. The Bill of Rights was added to keep the precincts of belief and expression, of the press, of political and social activities free from surveillance. The Bill of Rights was designed to keep agents of government and official eavesdroppers away from assemblies of people. The aim was to allow men to be free and independent and to assert their rights against the government. There can be no influence more paralyzing of that objective than Army surveillance. When an intelligence officer looks over every nonconformist's shoulder in the library or walks invisibly by his side in a picket line, or infiltrates his club, the America once extolled as the voice of liberty heard around the world no longer is cast in the image which Jefferson and Madison designed, but more in the Russian image.

== Participation by Justice Rehnquist ==
The dismissal of the case was made possible by the timely nomination by Richard Nixon of Assistant Attorney General William Rehnquist to the Supreme Court. Rehnquist had previously testified to Senator Sam Ervin's committee that there were no 'serious constitutional problems with respect to collecting data or keeping under surveillance persons who are merely exercising their right of a peaceful assembly or petition to redress a grievance.' He further stated that he felt that Laird v. Tatum should be dismissed on the procedural ground that the plaintiffs lacked standing to sue. Yet he later refused to recuse himself from the case though legal ethicists almost unanimously agreed that he should. After a petition for rehearing was filed based on his participation, Rehnquist issued a memorandum stating that the attack on his impartiality was essentially a criticism of his conservative judicial philosophy and that there had been no actual bias towards the litigant.

== See also ==
- List of United States Supreme Court cases, volume 408

Surveillance-related

- Amnesty v. Blair
- Clapper v. Amnesty International
- COINTELPRO
- Fusion center
- PRISM (surveillance program)

Recusal-related

- appearance of impropriety
- conflict of interest
