= Volunteer military =

Military force which employs personnel on an exclusively volunteer basis

A volunteer military system or all-volunteer military system (AVMS) is a military service system that maintains the military only with applicants without conscription. A country may offer attractive pay and benefits through military recruitment to attract potential recruits. Many countries with volunteer militaries reserve the right to renew conscription in the event of an emergency. The Indian Army is the world's largest standing volunteer army.

In recent decades, the trend among numerous countries has been to move from conscription to all-volunteer military forces. One significant example is in France, which has historically been the first to introduce modern conscription and whose model was followed by many other countries in Europe and elsewhere around the world.

== Volunteer military ==
- Albania
- Antigua and Barbuda
- Argentina
- Australia
- Bahamas
- Bahrain
- Bangladesh
- Barbados
- Belgium
- Belize
- Bermuda
- Bhutan
- Bosnia and Herzegovina
- Botswana
- Brunei
- Bulgaria
- Burundi
- Cameroon
- Canada
- China (de facto, conscription not enforced)
- Comoros
- Congo
- Czech Republic
- Democratic Republic of the Congo
- Djibouti
- Dominican Republic
- Ecuador
- Ethiopia
- Fiji
- France
- Gabon
- Gambia
- Ghana
- Germany
- Guyana
- Honduras
- Hungary
- India
- Indonesia
- Iraq
- Ireland
- Italy
- Jamaica
- Japan
- Jordan
- Kenya
- Lebanon
- Lesotho
- Liberia
- Luxembourg
- Madagascar
- Malawi
- Maldives
- Malta
- Malaysia
- Morocco
- Montenegro
- Namibia
- Nepal
- Netherlands
- New Zealand
- Nicaragua
- Nigeria
- North Macedonia
- Oman
- Pakistan
- Papua New Guinea
- Peru
- Philippines
- Poland
- Portugal
- Qatar
- Romania
- Rwanda
- Saint Kitts and Nevis
- Saudi Arabia
- Serbia
- Seychelles
- Sierra Leone
- Slovakia
- Slovenia
- South Africa
- Spain
- Sri Lanka
- Suriname
- Swaziland
- Tanzania
- Timor-Leste
- Tonga
- Trinidad and Tobago
- Uganda
- United Kingdom
- United States of America
- Uruguay
- Zambia

== See also ==
- Conscription
- Mercenary
- Military service
- Military volunteer
- United States Volunteers
- Volunteer Force (Great Britain)
