= Michael D. Knox =

American educator and activist (born 1946)

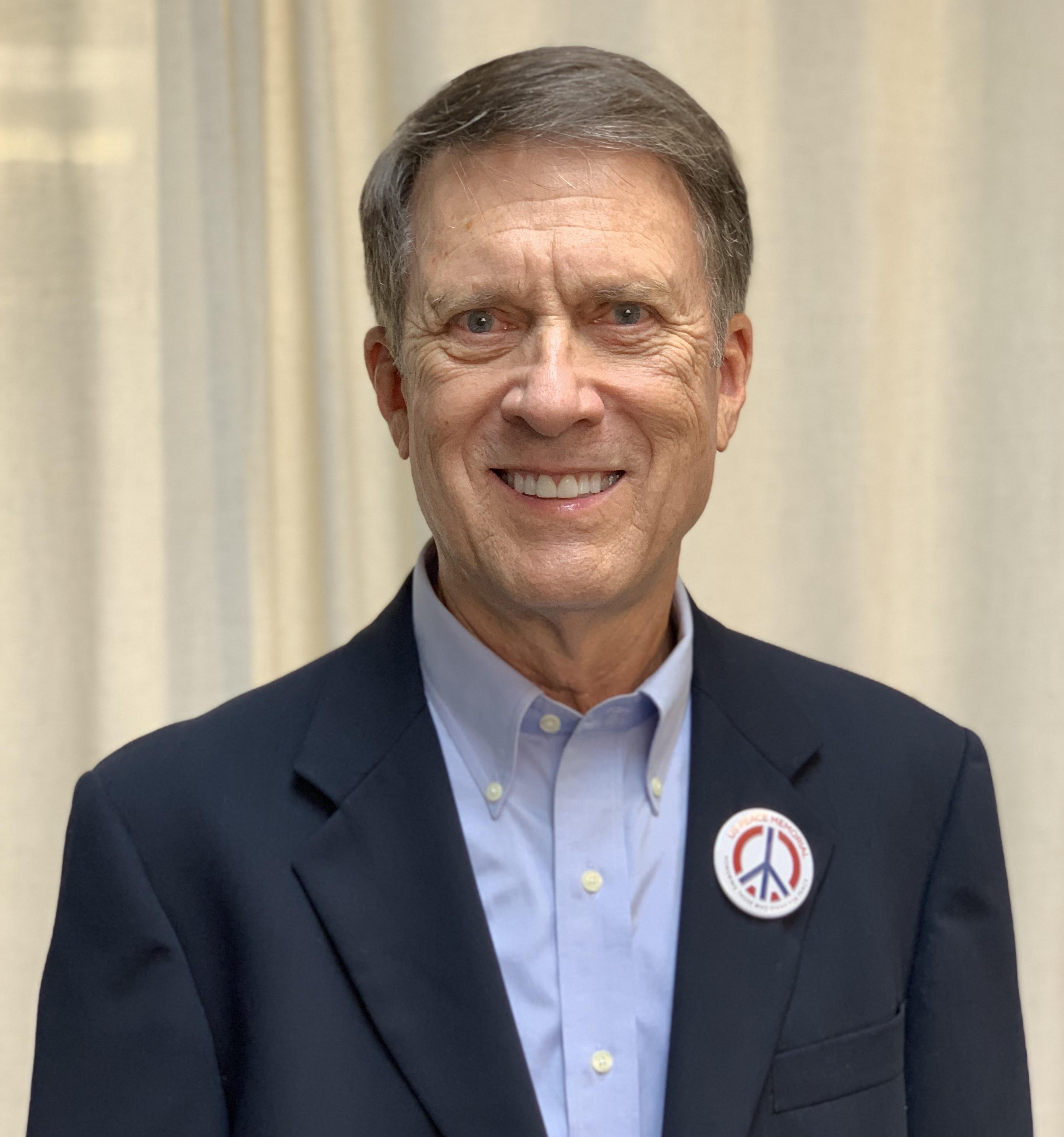
- Born: 1946 (age 79–80); Wyandotte, Michigan, US
- Occupation: Distinguished Professor

Academic background
- Education: University of Michigan

Academic work
- Institutions: University of South Florida
- Website: Department of Mental Health Law and Policy

Michael D. Knox (born in 1946 in Wyandotte, Michigan) is an American educator, psychologist, author, and anti-war activist. He is a distinguished university professor emeritus in the Department of Mental Health Law and Policy, an affiliate distinguished professor in the Department of Internal Medicine, and an affiliate distinguished professor emeritus of Global Health at the University of South Florida (USF).

== Education ==
- Ph.D., University of Michigan, Department of Psychology, 1974.
- M.A., University of Michigan, Department of Psychology, 1973.
- M.S.W., University of Michigan School of Social Work, 1971.
- B.A., Eastern Michigan University, Biology Major, Chemistry and Psychology Minors, 1968.

Knox is a fellow of the American Psychological Association and the Association for Psychological Science.

== Career ==
Knox's career has focused on aging, community mental health, ethics, HIV/AIDS prevention, and antiwar advocacy. Much of his academic work was accomplished at the University of South Florida, where he has been a faculty member since 1986. At USF, Knox developed grant-funded collaborations with the USF departments of internal medicine, psychiatry, pediatrics, criminology, and the USF College of Public Health. He also developed grant-funded consortia with the University of California, San Francisco, the University of Florida, the University of Miami, the University of Puerto Rico, the University of the Virgin Islands, Florida A&M University, and Emory University.

In 1995, Knox co-authored LAST WISHES: A Handbook to Guide Your Survivors. The book has been reviewed in The Journal of the American Medical Association, The Lancet, and The Saturday Evening Post. He is the senior editor and contributor to HIV and Community Mental Healthcare, a book published in 1998 by Johns Hopkins University Press.

=== Mental health work and scholarship ===
From 1978 to 1986, Knox was director of the Western Tidewater Mental Health Center in Virginia. He also served on the faculty of the Eastern Virginia Medical School and on the board of directors of the Eastern Virginia Health Systems Agency.

Knox joined the USF faculty in 1986. He headed the United States' only academic department of community mental health for 9 years. In 1995 and 1996, he was elected president of the USF Faculty Senate. He was elected chair of the Advisory Council of Faculty Senates for 1997/1998, an organization that represented all ten state universities and provided consultation to the chancellor and Florida Board of Regents regarding academic issues. Since 1997, he has held the title of distinguished university professor at USF. In 1999, as part of a sabbatical assignment related to end-of-life care, he served as a visiting scholar at the University of Oxford. He has held leadership positions in community mental health, including service on the board of directors of the National Council of Community Mental Health Centers and advisory roles with the Joint Commission on Accreditation of Hospitals. In addition, he chaired the first steering committee for the National Registry of Community Mental Health Services and has conducted site reviews nationwide for the federal Center for Mental Health Services.

=== HIV/AIDS work and scholarship ===
Knox served as founder and director of the USF Center for HIV Education and Research. Since 1988, the USF Center has provided continuing education to more than 500,000 health and mental healthcare professionals and students.

Knox directed the Florida/Caribbean Aids Education and Training Center (AETC) as the Principal Investigator. The F/C AETC's mission was to ensure that physicians, nurses, nurse practitioners, physician assistants, dentists, pharmacists, and other health professionals in Florida, Puerto Rico, and the US Virgin Islands receive information, training, and consultation on prevention and treatment of HIV and AIDS. Knox supervised the work of over 80 expert faculty specializing in HIV/AIDS. Under his directorship, the AETC worked collaboratively with the University of South Florida, the University of Puerto Rico, the University of Florida, the University of Miami, the University of the Virgin Islands, and Florida A&M University to provide faculty and clinical training sites throughout the region.

Knox traveled to India in 2003 to speak and to dedicate two new educational programs associated with USF. He co-chaired the American Foundation for AIDS Research's 16th National HIV/AIDS Update Conference in 2004.

=== Antiwar efforts ===
As a delegate to the 20th National Student Congress, Knox introduced a resolution to hold an antiwar demonstration in August 1967 at the White House. In 1970, he co-founded a draft counseling center. In 1971, he blew the whistle on classified research in which University of Michigan faculty were studying and consulting on weapon systems used by the military. Since then, he has engaged in speeches, debates, interviews, and other actions regarding antiwar activism.

In 2005, Knox founded the US Peace Memorial Foundation. He directs its nationwide effort to recognize antiwar/peace leadership by writing and editing the US Peace Registry, awarding The US Peace Prize, and providing educational programs. He has officiated at the awarding of the US Peace Prize every year since 2009. Knox was awarded the 2007 Marsella Psychologists for Social Responsibility Award. In 2018, he was included in Transcend Media's "In Pursuit of Peace and Justice: 100 Peace & Justice Leaders and Models". Knox received the 2022 Ralph K. White Lifetime Achievement Award from the American Psychological Association for his "ground-breaking theoretical and applied research which has led to new directions in developing cultures of peace, including establishing and leading the non-profit US Peace Memorial Foundation".

== Selected publications ==
- Ending U.S. Wars by Honouring Americans Who Work for Peace. 2021. PAX.
- (with L.R. Frank and A.M. Wagganer) "HIV/AIDS and Mental Disorders" in B. Lubotsky Levin and M.A. Becker's A Public Health Perspective of Women’s Mental Health. Springer.
- "HIV and the Older Adult" in K.S. Markides' The Encyclopedia of Health and Aging. 2007. SAGE Publications.
- (with Chenneville, T.) "Prevention and Education Strategies" in F. Fernandez & P. Ruiz's Psychiatric Aspects of HIV/AIDS. 2006. Lippincott Williams & Wilkins.
- (with C.F. Clark and M.G. Dow) "Identifying and Treating Depression, Anxiety, and Dementia" in Beal, Orrick and Alfonso's HIV/AIDS Primary Care Guide. 2006. Crown House Publishing.
- "AIDS Education and Training (Foreword)" in Beal, Orrick and Alfonso's HIV/AIDS Primary Care Guide. 2006. Crown House Publishing.
- (with C.F. Clark and M.G. Dow) "Treatment of Mental Health Issues" in Steinhart, Orrick & Simpson's HIV/AIDS Primary Care Guide. 2002: University of Florida.
- (ed.) National Registry of AIDS Education and Training Centers. 2000. National Association of AIDS Education and Training Centers.
- (ed. with Sparks, C.H.) HIV and Community Mental Healthcare. 1998. The Johns Hopkins University Press.
- (ed. and contributor) HIV and Community Mental Healthcare. 1998. The Johns Hopkins University Press.
- (with Knox, L.P.). Last Wishes: A Handbook to Guide Your Survivors. Berkeley. 1995. Ulysses Press.
- (with Gaies, J.S.) "The Therapist and the Dying Client" in G.J. Stine's Acquired Immune Deficiency Syndrome. 1993. Prentice Hall.
