= Military recruitment =

Recruitment for military positions

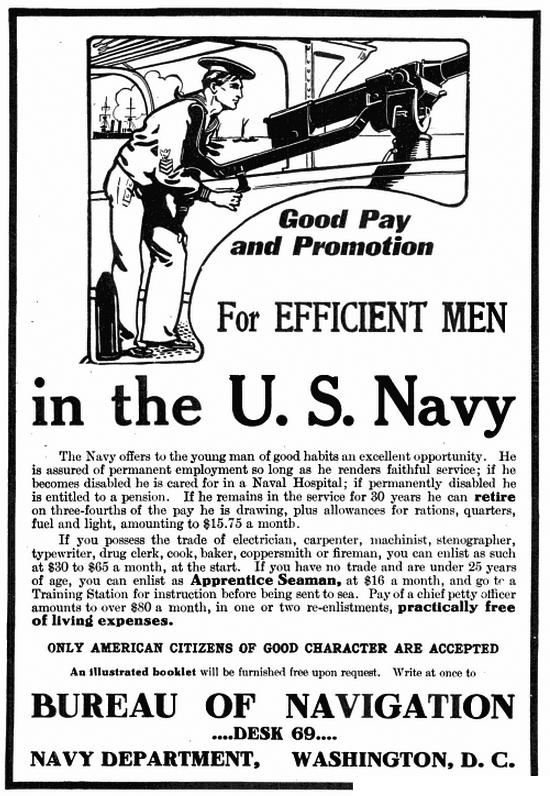
U.S. Navy recruitment advertisement in Popular Mechanics, 1908.

Military recruitment is attracting people to, and selecting them for, military training and employment.

== Demographics ==
=== Gender ===
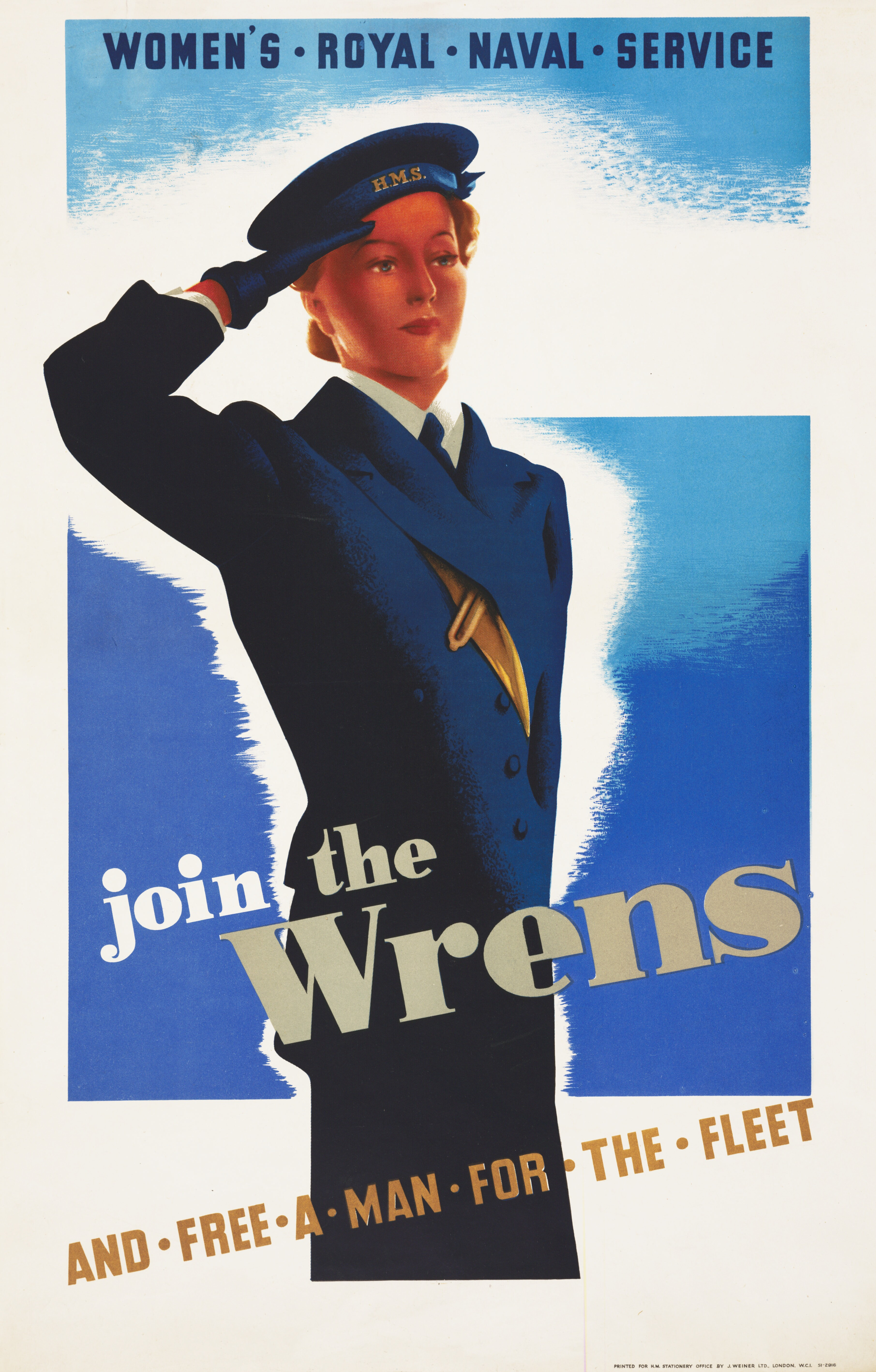
A World War II recruiting poster for the Women's Royal Naval Service. Recruiting women for non-combat roles freed up men for the front lines.

Across the world, a large majority of recruits to state armed forces and non-state armed groups are male. The proportion of female personnel varies internationally; for example, it is approximately 3% in India, 10% in the UK, 13% in Sweden, 16% in the US, and 27% in South Africa.

While many states do not recruit women for ground close combat roles (i.e. roles which would require them to kill an opponent at close quarters), several have lifted this ban in recent years, including larger Western military powers such as France, the UK, and US.

Compared with male personnel and female civilians, female personnel face substantially higher risks of sexual harassment and sexual violence, according to British, Canadian, and US research.

Some states, including the UK, US and Canada have begun to recognise a right of transgender people to serve openly in their armed forces, although this development has met with political and cultural resistance.

=== Age group ===
State armed forces set minimum and maximum ages for recruitment. In practice, most military recruits are young adults; for example, in 2013 the average age of a United States Army soldier beginning initial training was 20.7 years.

==== Child recruitment ====
Under the Convention on the Rights of the Child, a child means a person aged under 18.

The minimum age at which children may be recruited or conscripted under the Rome Statute of the International Criminal Court is 15. States which have ratified the Optional Protocol to the Convention on the Rights of the Child on the Involvement of Children in Armed Conflict (OPAC) may not conscript children at all, but may enlist children aged 16 or above provided that they are not used to participate directly in hostilities.

Historically, the use of children for military purposes has been widespread—see Children in the military—but has been in decline in the 21st century. According to Child Soldiers International, as of 2017 approximately two-thirds of states worldwide had committed to restrict military recruitment to adults from age 18, and at least 60 non-state armed groups had signed agreements to stop or reduce the use of children for military purposes. The organization reported that the so-called Straight 18 standard – the restriction of all military employment to adults – had been emerging as a global norm since 2001.

However, Child Soldiers International also reported in 2018 that at least 46 states were recruiting personnel below the age of 18. Most of these states were recruiting from age 17, including Australia, China, France, Germany, Saudi Arabia and the United States (US); approximately 20 were recruiting from age 16, including Brazil, Canada, and the United Kingdom (UK).

Most states which recruit children under the age of 18 have undertaken not to deploy them routinely on military operations, having ratified the OPAC treaty. According to the Secretary-General of the United Nations (UNSG), in 2016 14 states were still recruiting and using children in active armed conflicts: Afghanistan, Central African Republic, Colombia, Democratic Republic of Congo, Iraq, Mali, Myanmar, Nigeria, Philippines, Somalia, South Sudan, Sudan, Syria and Yemen.

The UNSG also reported that non-state armed groups were recruiting and using children in armed conflict in India, Pakistan, Palestine, Libya, Philippines and Thailand.

Cross-cultural studies suggest that, in general, children and young people are drawn to military employment for similar reasons: war, economic motivation, education, family and friends, politics, and identity and psychosocial factors.

=== Socio-economic background ===
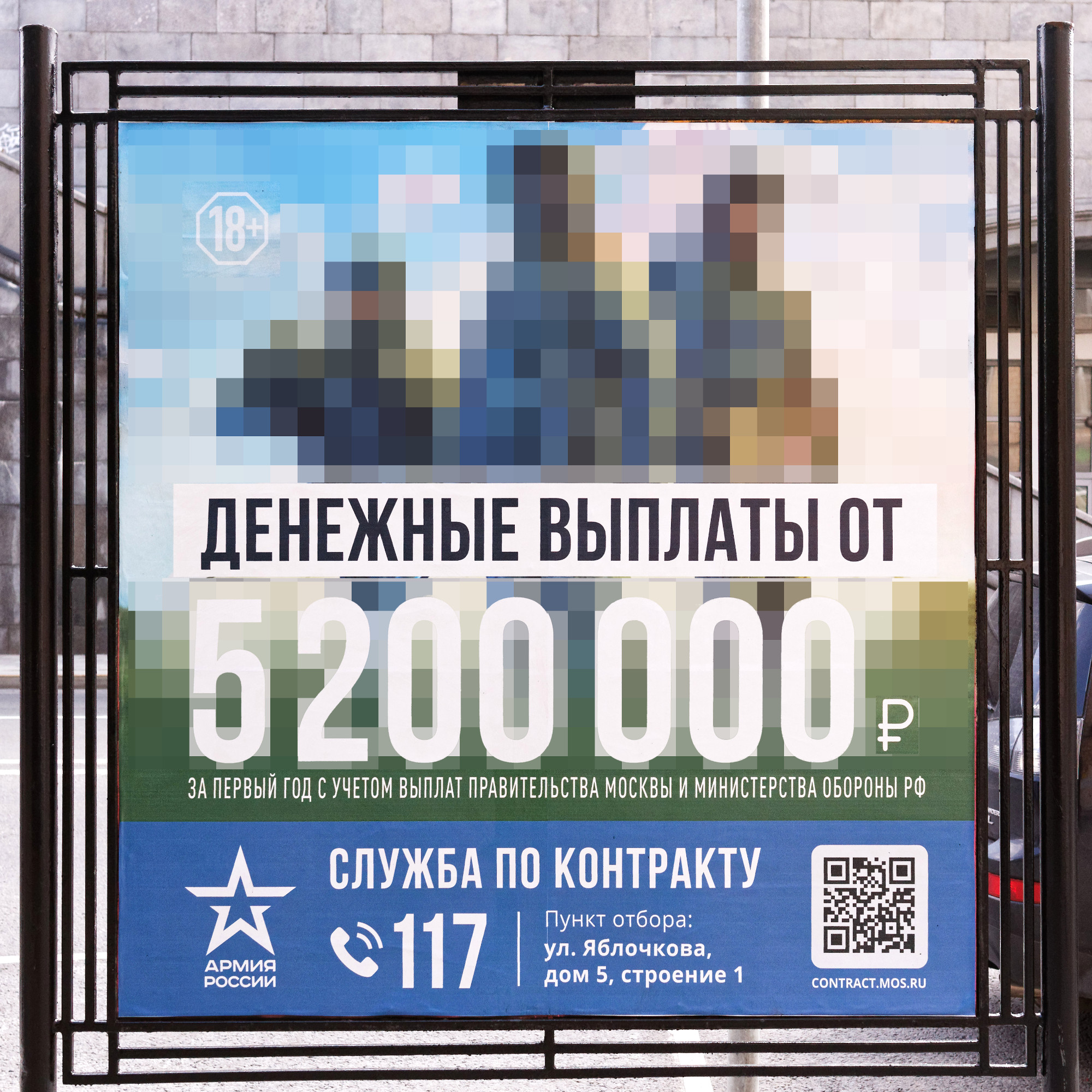
Billboard in Moscow promoting contract army service in August 2024. The poster promised income "from 5.2 million rubles" (approx. $60,000) for the first year of active duty.

The hope of escaping socio-economic deprivation is one of the main factors attracting young people to military employment. (Thus the obsolete English-language term "bezonian" may mean "raw recruit" or "pauper".) After the US suspended conscription in 1973, "the military disproportionately attracted African American men, men from lower-status socioeconomic backgrounds, men who had been in nonacademic high school programs, and men whose high school grades tended to be low". However, a 2020 study suggests that the socio-economic status of U.S. Armed Forces personnel is at parity with or slightly higher than the civilian population and that the most disadvantaged socio-economic groups are less likely to meet the requirements of the modern U.S. military. A study found that technological, tactical, operational and doctrinal changes have led to a change in the demand for personnel. As an indication of the socio-economic background of British Army personnel, as of 2015 three-quarters of its youngest recruits had the literacy skills normally expected of an 11-year-old or younger, and 7% had a reading age of 5–7. The British Army's recruitment drive in 2017 targeted working-class families with an average annual income of £10,000.

Recruitment for officers typically draws on upwardly-mobile young adults from age 18, and recruiters for these roles focus their resources on high-achieving schools and universities. (Canada is an exception, recruiting high-achieving children from age 16 for officer training.)

== Outreach and marketing ==
=== Early years ===
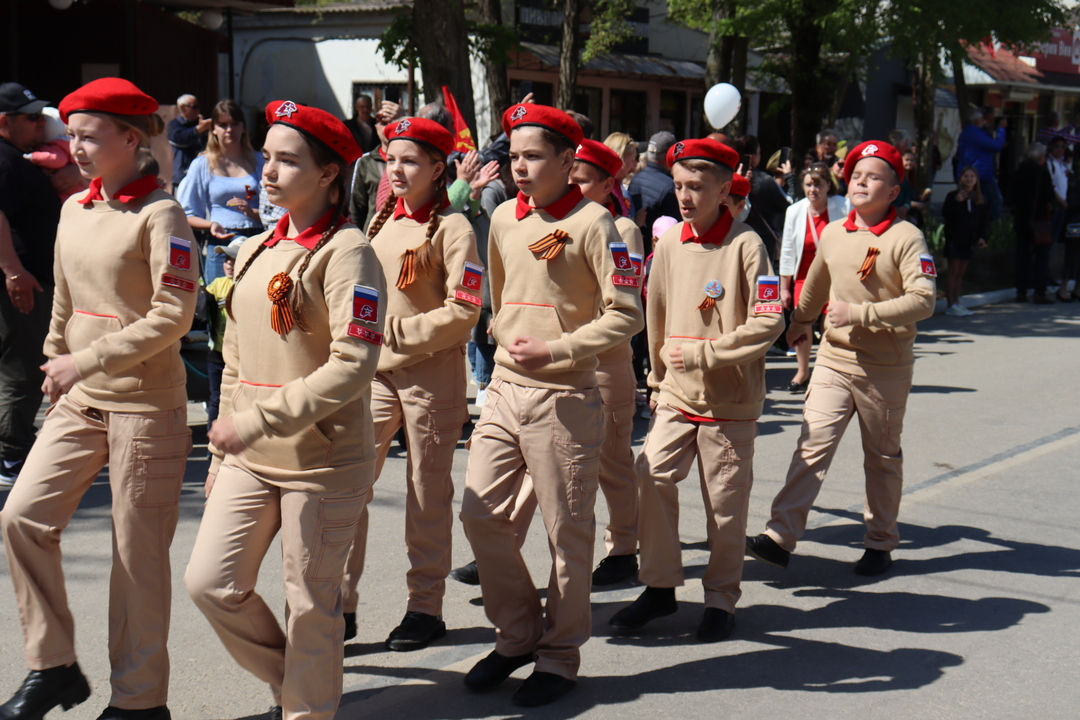
Vladimir Putin's Young Army in Crimea on 9 May 2022

The process of attracting children and young people to military employment begins in their early years. In Germany, Israel, Poland, the UK, the US, and elsewhere, the armed forces visit schools frequently, including primary schools, to encourage children to enlist once they become old enough to do so. For example, a poster used by the German armed forces in schools reads: "After school you have the world at your feet, make it safer." ["Nach der Schule liegt dir die Welt zu Füßen, mach sie sicherer."] In the US, recruiters have right of access to all schools and to the contact details of students, and are encouraged to embed themselves into the school community. A former head of recruitment for the British Army, Colonel (latterly Brigadier) David Allfrey, explained the British approach in 2007:

Our new model is about raising awareness, and that takes a ten-year span. It starts with a seven-year-old boy seeing a parachutist at an air show and thinking, 'That looks great.' From then the army is trying to build interest by drip, drip, drip.

=== Popular culture ===
Recruiters use action films and videogames to promote military employment. Scenes from Hollywood blockbusters (including Behind Enemy Lines and X-Men: First Class) have been spliced into military advertising in the US, for example. In the US and elsewhere, the armed forces commission bespoke videogames to present military life to children and have created the U.S. Army Esports initiative as an outreach program using esports.

=== Military schools and youth organisations ===
Many states operate military schools, cadet forces, and other military youth organisations. For example, Russia operates a system of military schools for children from age 10, where combat skills and weapons training are taught as part of the curriculum. The UK is one of many states that subsidise participation in cadet forces, where children from age 12 play out a stylised representation of military employment. The United States offers Junior Reserve Officers' Training Corps to high school students as an extracurricular activity.

=== Advertising ===
Armed forces commission recruitment advertising across a wide range of media, including television, radio, cinema, online including social media, the press, billboards, brochures and leaflets, Employment websites and through merchandising.

=== Public realm ===
Recruiters use civic space to promote their military organisation. Among the methods used are recruitment stalls in public spaces, air shows; military amusement parks, such as Patriot Park in Russia; national days, such as the Belgian national day and military parade; and annual armed forces days.

== Messaging ==
Recruitment marketing seeks to appeal to potential recruits in the following ways:

- Traditionally masculine associations. Historically and today, recruitment materials frequently associate military life with that of a traditionally masculine warrior, which is officially encouraged as a martial ideal. For example, Cold War US Army slogans included "Join the army, Be a man" and "The army will make a man out of you"; in 2007 a new slogan was introduced: "There's strong. Then there's army strong". Similarly, recruiters describe the Israeli infantryman as "discovering all your strengths"; and the British is "harder, faster, fitter, stronger".
- Teamwork and belonging. Some armed forces appeal to potential recruits with the promise of teamwork and camaraderie. An example is the British Army, which introduced the slogan "This is belonging" in 2017.
- Patriotic service. Some armed forces present military life as a patriotic service. For example, the slogan for the German Bundeswehr is "We. Serve. Germany." ["Wir. Dienen. Deutschland."], and an advertisement for the Israeli Defense Forces encourages potential recruits to "Above all, fight [kravi] for your country, because there is no place better than Israel."
- Challenge and adventure. Military life is promised to be exciting, including world travel and adventurous training. In 2015, the British Army presentation to schools included prominent images of scuba diving and snowboarding, for example.
- Education and skills. The armed forces are often presented as a means to learn new skills. For example, the Swedish armed forces encourage potential recruits with the promise of "education that leads to a job where you can make a difference".

== Application process ==
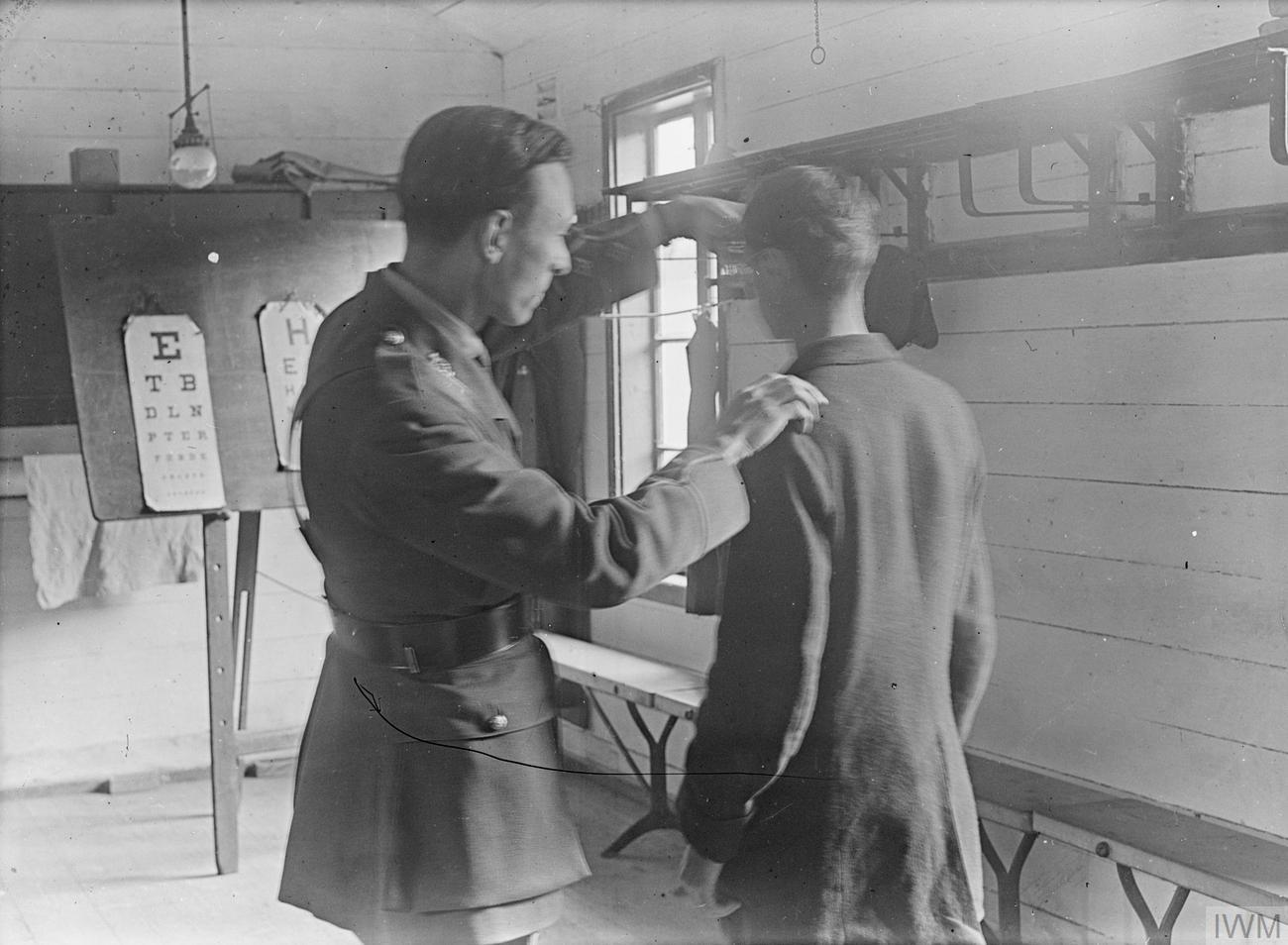
A military recruit undergoing an eye examination, September 1917

Typically, candidates for military employment apply online or at a recruitment centre.

Many eligibility criteria normally apply, which may be related to age, nationality, height and weight (body mass index), medical history, psychiatric history, illicit drug use, criminal record, academic results, proof of identity, satisfactory references, and whether any tattoos are visible. A minimum standard of academic attainment may be required for entry, for certain technical roles, or for entry to train for a leadership position as an commissioned officer. Candidates who meet the criteria will normally also undergo aptitude test, medical examination, psychological interview, job interview and fitness assessment.

Depending on whether the application criteria are met, and depending also on which military units have vacancies for new recruits, candidates may or may not be offered a job in a certain role or roles. Candidates who accept a job offer then wait for their recruit training to begin. Either at or before the start of their training, candidates swear or affirm an oath of allegiance and/or sign their joining papers.

The period between the initial application to swearing the oath may be several weeks or months. During this time many candidates drop out. For example, in 2017 about 1 in 20 applicants to the British Army were eventually enlisted.

Most state armed forces that enlist minors (persons under the age of 18) are required by law to obtain the informed consent of one or both parents or legal guardians before their child's enlistment can take place. In practice, consent is indicated on a form, which parents/guardians sign.

Once enlistment has taken place, recruits are subject to military terms of service and begin their initial training.

== Terms of service ==
Recruits enter a binding contract of service, which for full-time personnel typically requires a minimum period of service of several years, with the exception of a short discharge window, near the beginning of their service, allowing them to leave the armed force as of right. Part-time military employment, known as reserve service, allows a recruit to maintain a civilian job while training under military discipline for a minimum number of days per year. After leaving the armed forces, for a fixed period (between four and six years is normal in the UK and US, for example), former recruits may remain liable for compulsory return to full-time military employment in order to train or deploy on operations.

From the point of their enlistment/commissioning, personnel become subject to military law, which introduces offences not recognised by civilian courts, such as disobedience. Penalties range from a summary reprimand to imprisonment for several years following a court martial.

Personnel may be posted to bases in their home country or overseas, according to operational need, and may be deployed from those bases on exercises or operations anywhere in the world.

Perks of military service typically include adventurous training; subsidised accommodation, meals and travel; and a pension. Some armed forces also subsidise recruits' education before, during and/or after military service, subject to conditions such as an obligatory minimum period of formal military employment; examples are the St Jean military college in Canada, the Welbeck Defence Sixth Form College in the UK, and the GI Bill arrangements in the US.

== Counter-recruitment ==
Counter-recruitment refers to activity opposing military recruitment, or aspects of it. Among its forms are political advocacy, consciousness-raising, and direct action. The rationale for counter-recruitment activity may be based on any of the following reasons:

- The view that war is immoral - see pacifism.
- The view that some military organizations are a tool of imperialism - see anti-imperialism.
- Evidence from Australia, Canada, France, the UK, and the US that abusive behaviour such as bullying, racism, sexism and sexual violence, and homophobia are common in military organizations. See, for example, Women in the military and Sexual orientation and gender identity in military service.
- Evidence from the UK and US that military training and employment lead to higher rates of mental health and behavioural problems than are usually found in civilian life, particularly after personnel have left the armed forces.
- Evidence from Germany, Israel, the UK, and the US that recruiting practices sanitise war, glorify the role of military personnel, and obscure the risks and obligations of military employment, thereby misleading potential recruits, particularly adolescents from socio-economically deprived backgrounds.
- Evidence from Germany, the UK, and elsewhere that recruiters target, and capitalise on the precarious position of socio-economically deprived young people as potential recruits.
- The fact that some armed forces rely on children aged 16 or 17 to fill their ranks, and evidence from Australia, Israel, the UK and from the Vietnam era in the US that these youngest recruits are most likely to be adversely affected by the demands and risks of military life.

Armed forces spokespeople have defended the status quo by recourse to the following:

- The view that military organizations provide a valuable public service.
- Anecdotal evidence that military employment benefits young people.
- The view that duty of care policies protect recruits from harm.

== Recruitment slogans and images ==
=== Slogans ===
Armed forces have made effective use of short slogans to inspire young people to enlist, with themes ranging from personal development (particularly personal power), societal service, and patriotic duty. For example, as of 2017 current slogans included:

- 'Live a Life Less Ordinary.' (Indian Army)
- 'Army strong.' (US Army).
- 'Be the Best.' (British Army).
- 'Dare to be extraordinary.' (Canadian armed forces).
- 'We. Serve. Germany.' ['Wir. Dienen. Deutschland.'] (German armed forces).
- 'For me, for others.' ['Pour moi, pour les autres.'] (French Army).

=== Posters ===
A recruitment poster is a poster used in advertisement to recruit people into an organization, and has been a common method of military recruitment.

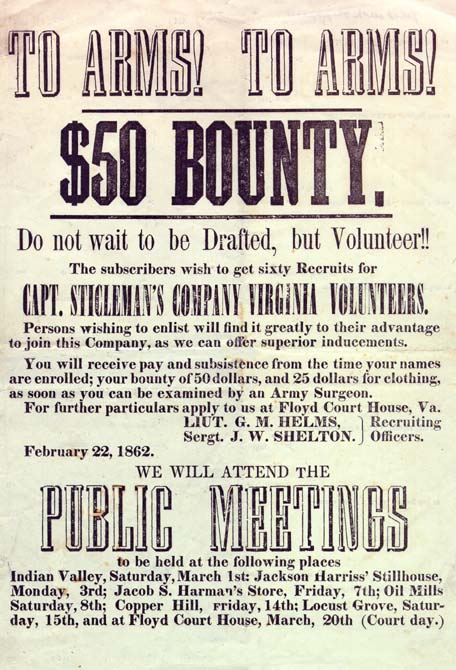
"To Arms! To Arms!" Recruitment poster for Confederate States of America. Floyd County, Virginia, 1862.

A World War I recruitment poster featuring Lord Kitchener (British Minister of War)

J. M. Flagg's Uncle Sam recruited soldiers for World War I, and was revived in later wars. Based on the Kitchener poster

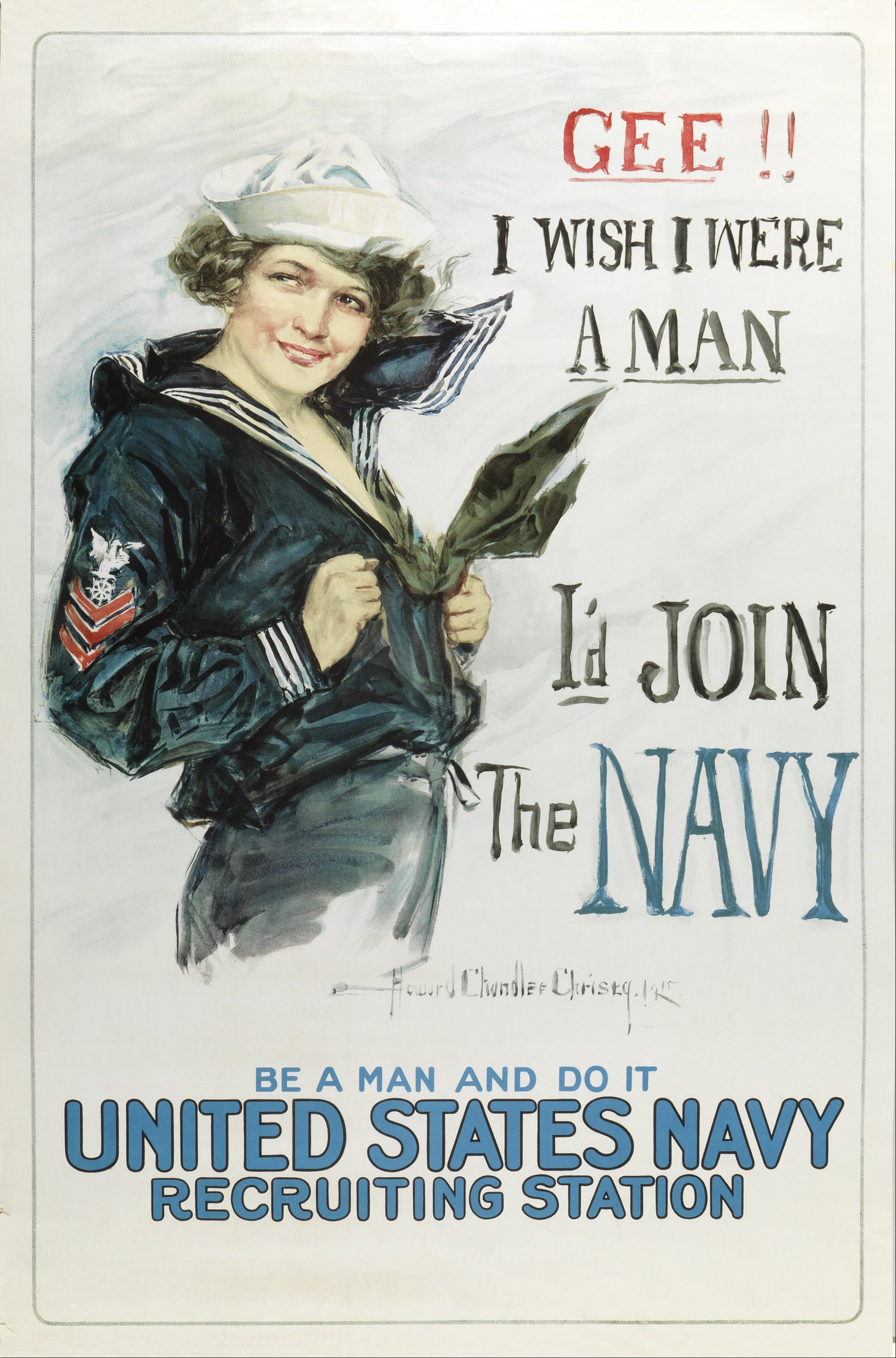
Recruiting poster made by and for the United States Navy c.1917

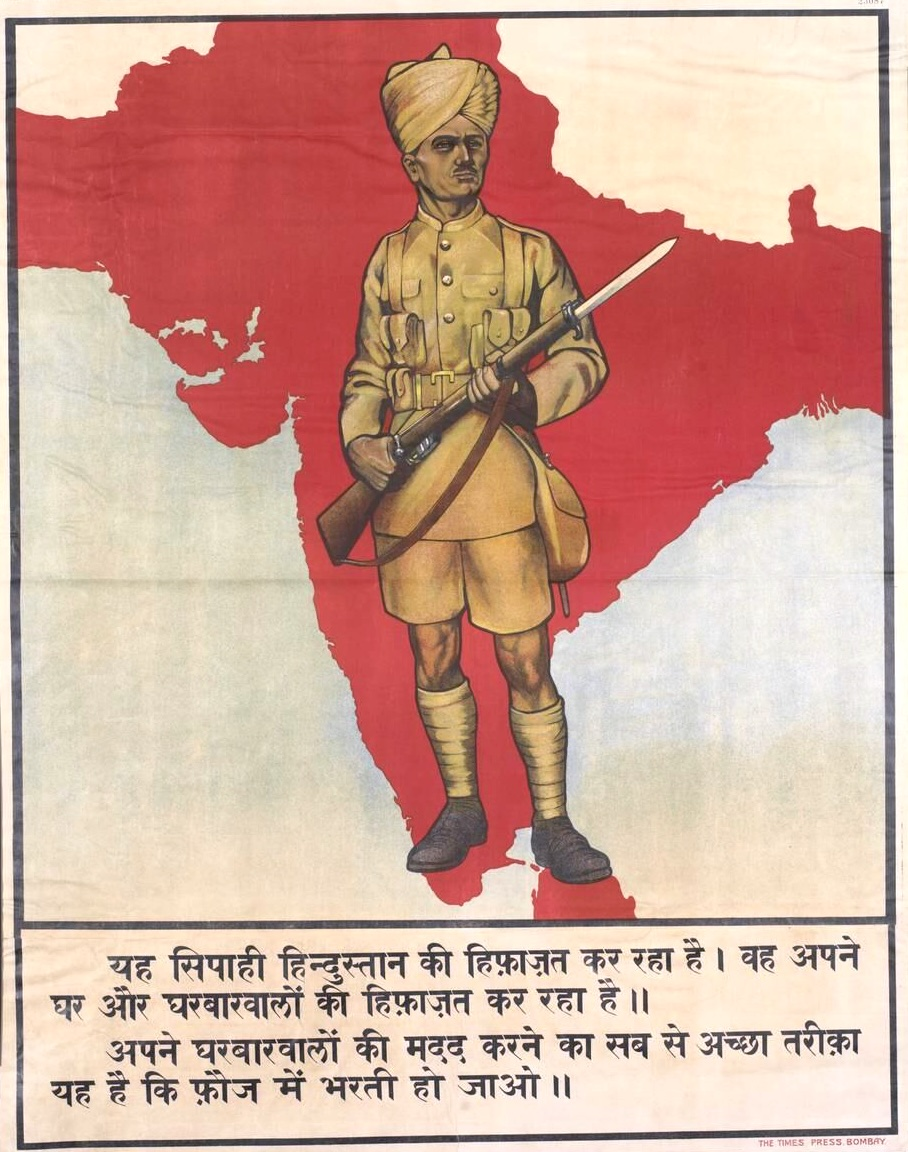
"This Soldier Defends India" - An Indian Army recruitment poster during World War I

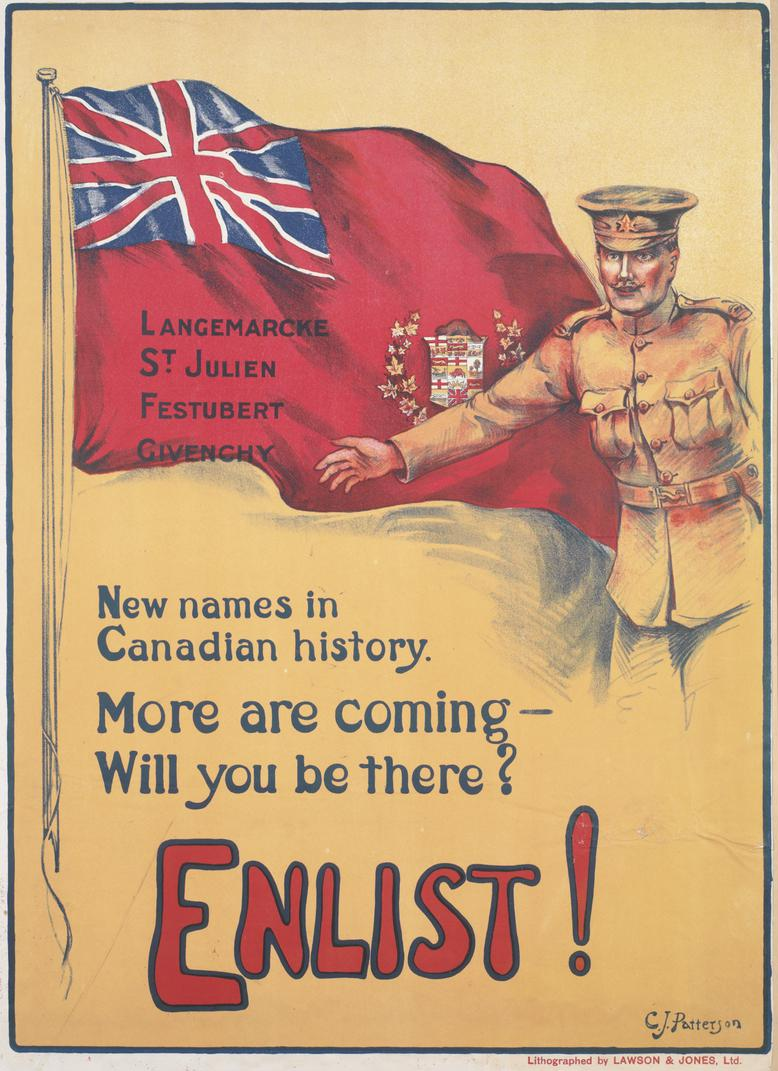
A Canadian World War I recruitment poster

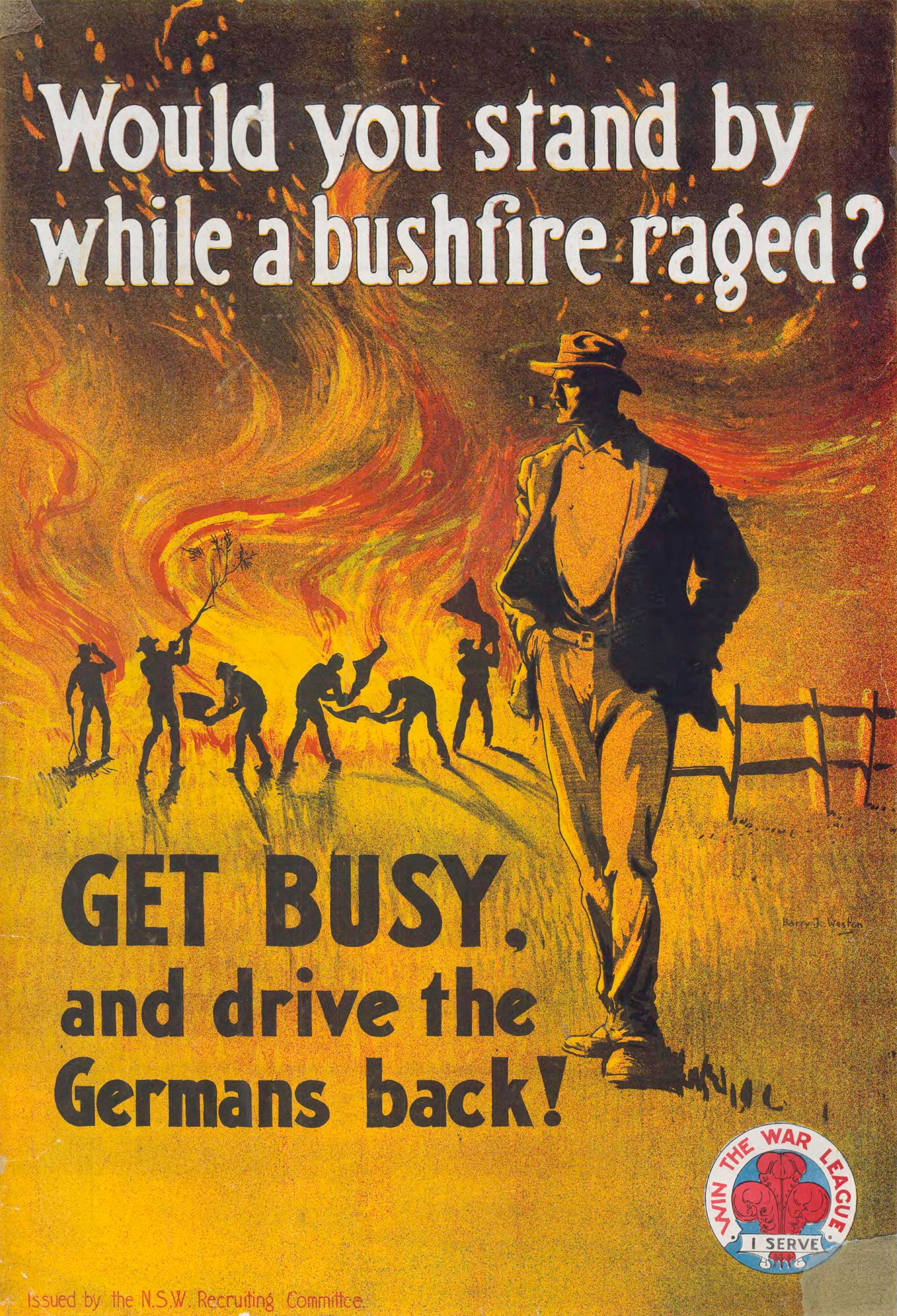
An Australian World War I recruitment poster

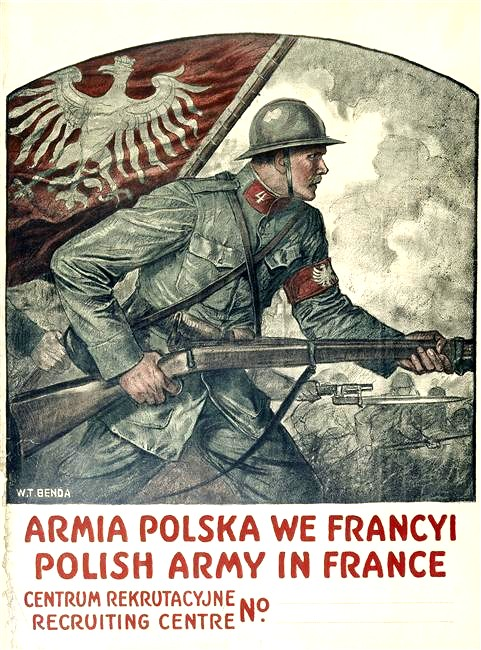
Recruitment poster for Polish Army in France

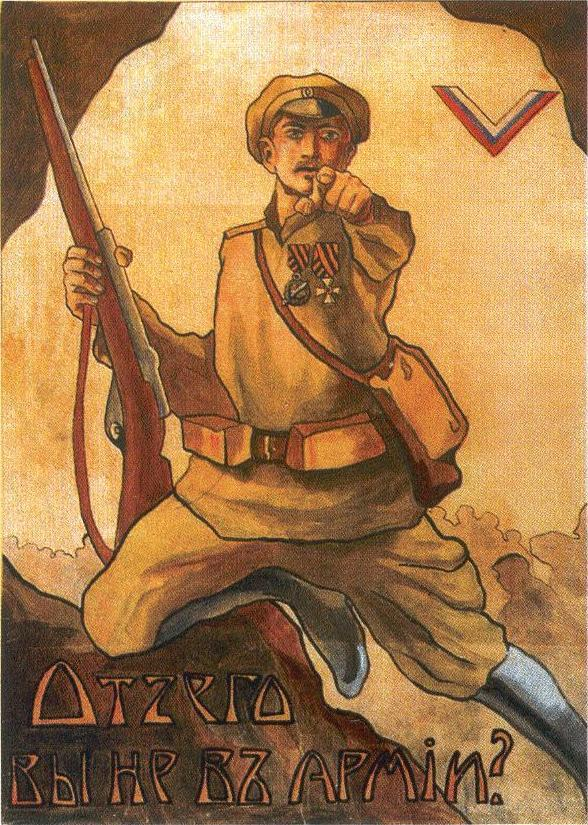
"Why aren't you in the army?" Volunteer Army recruitment poster during the Russian Civil War featuring Anton Denikin.

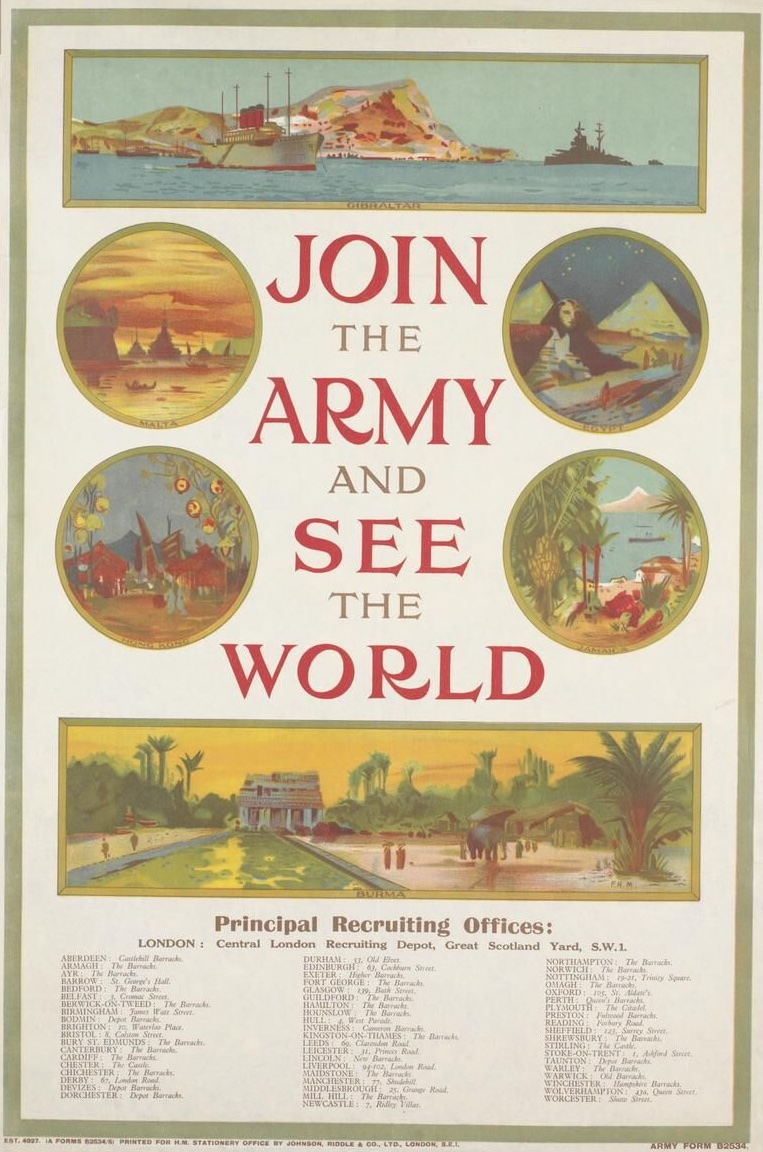
British Army recruitment poster of the inter-war period

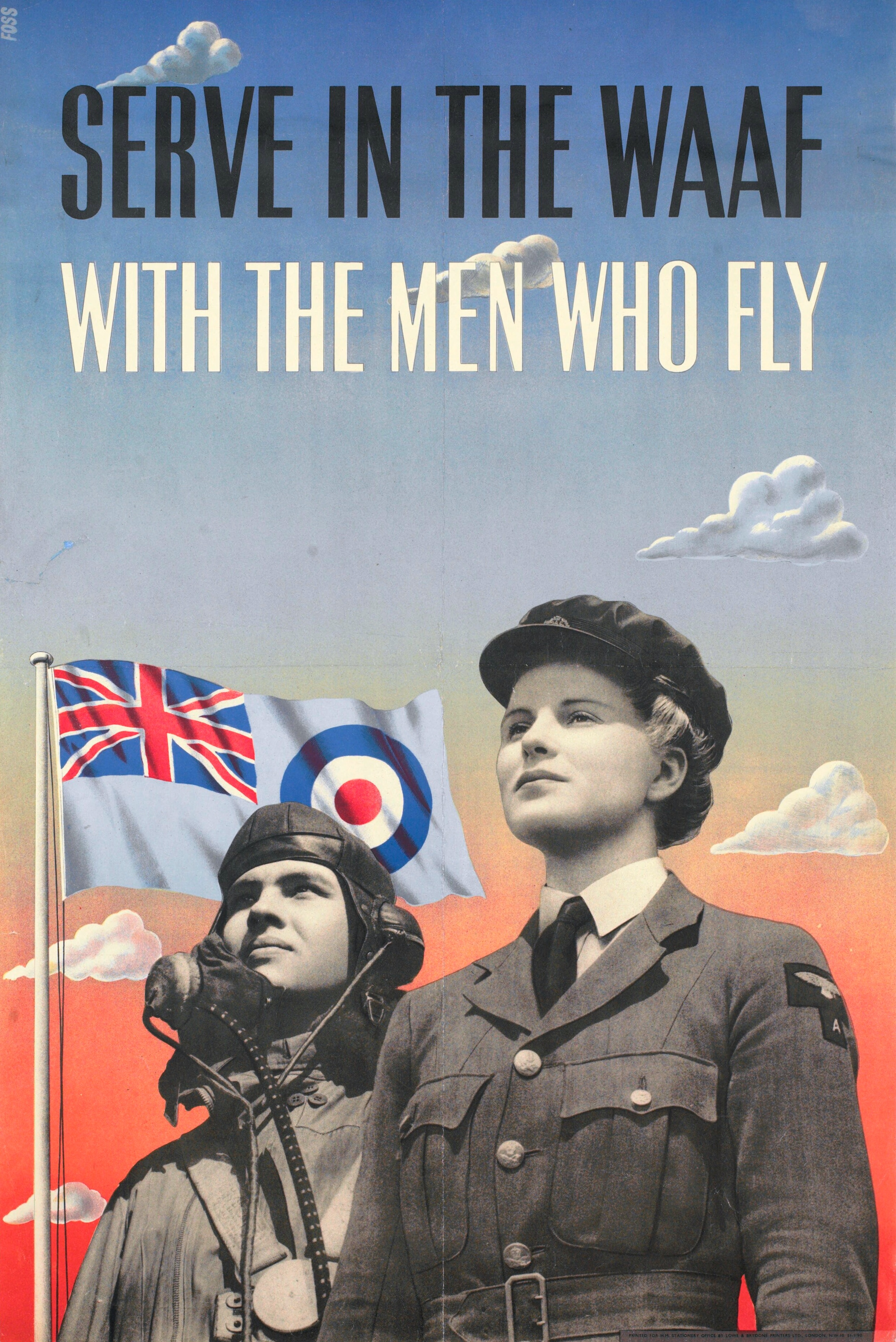
Recruiting poster for the Women's Auxiliary Air Force, 1941

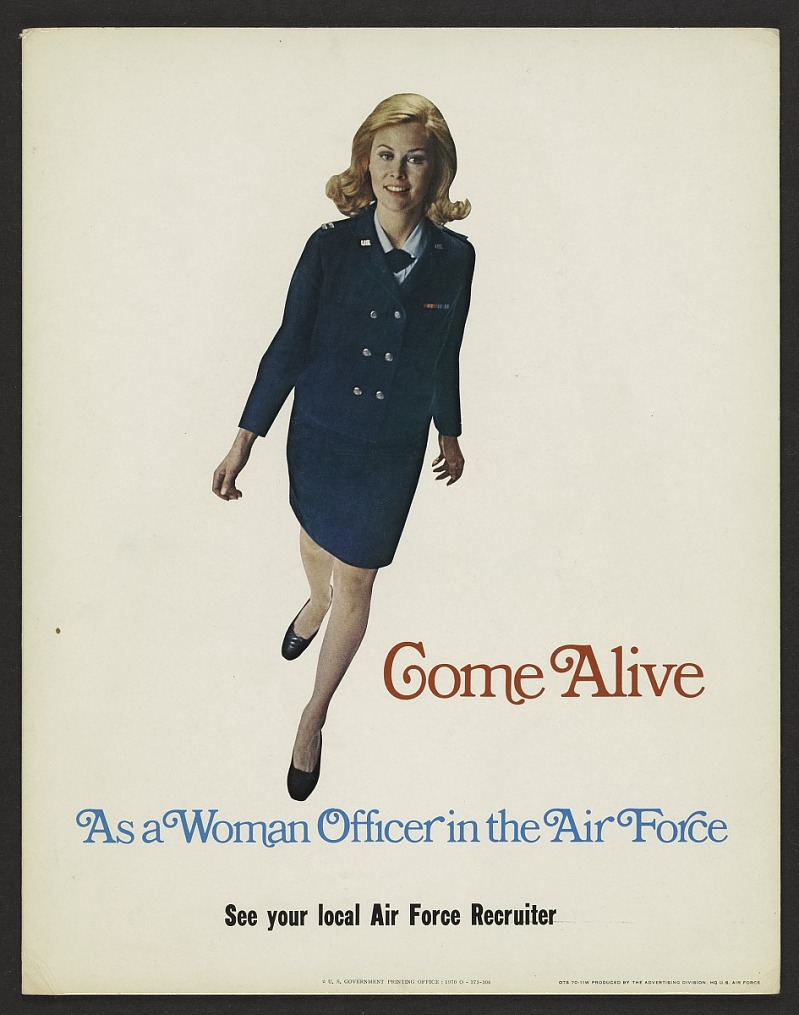
Recruitment poster for the United States Air Force, 1970

=== Recruitment centres ===
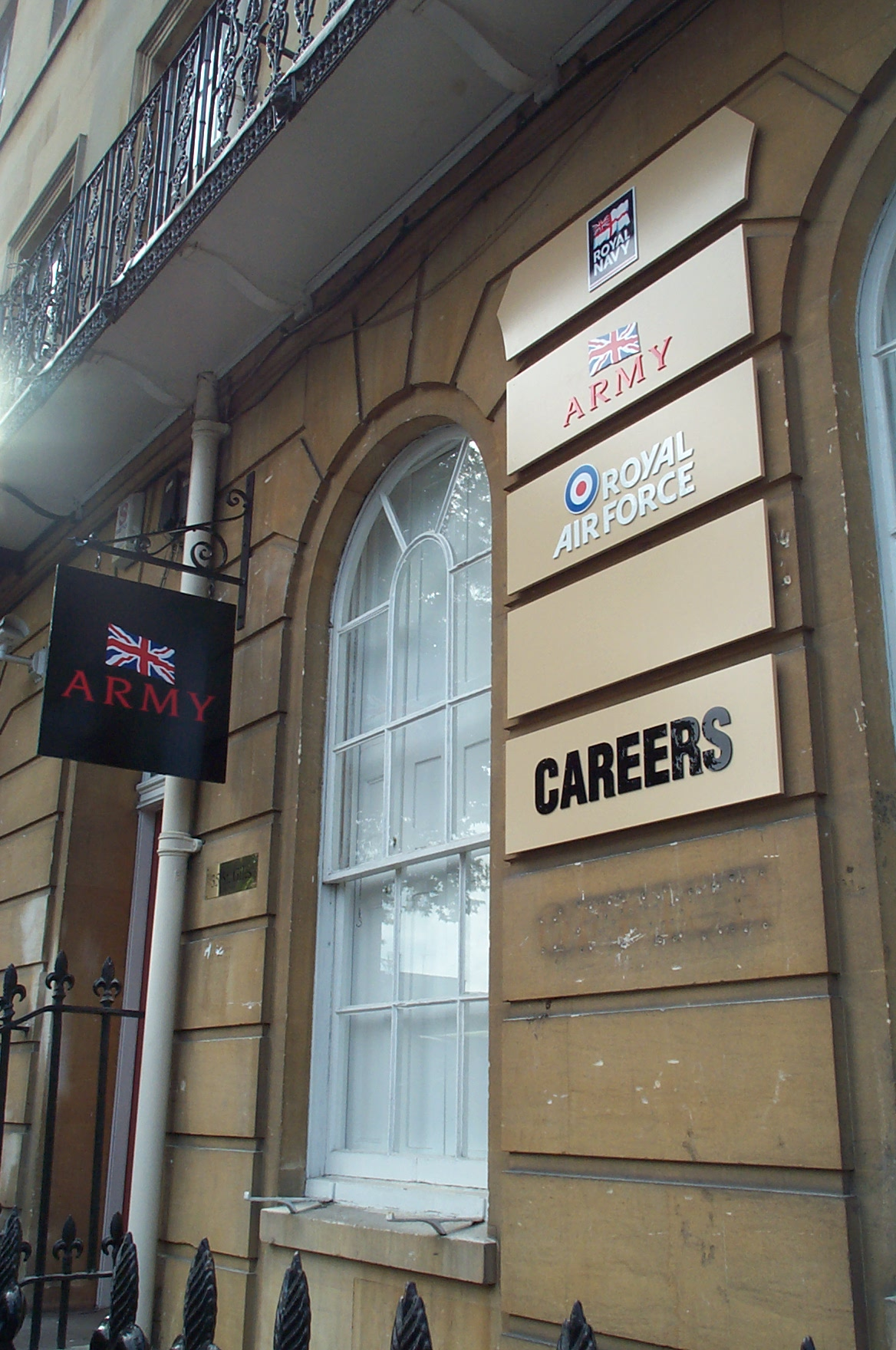
A British Military recruitment centre in Oxford

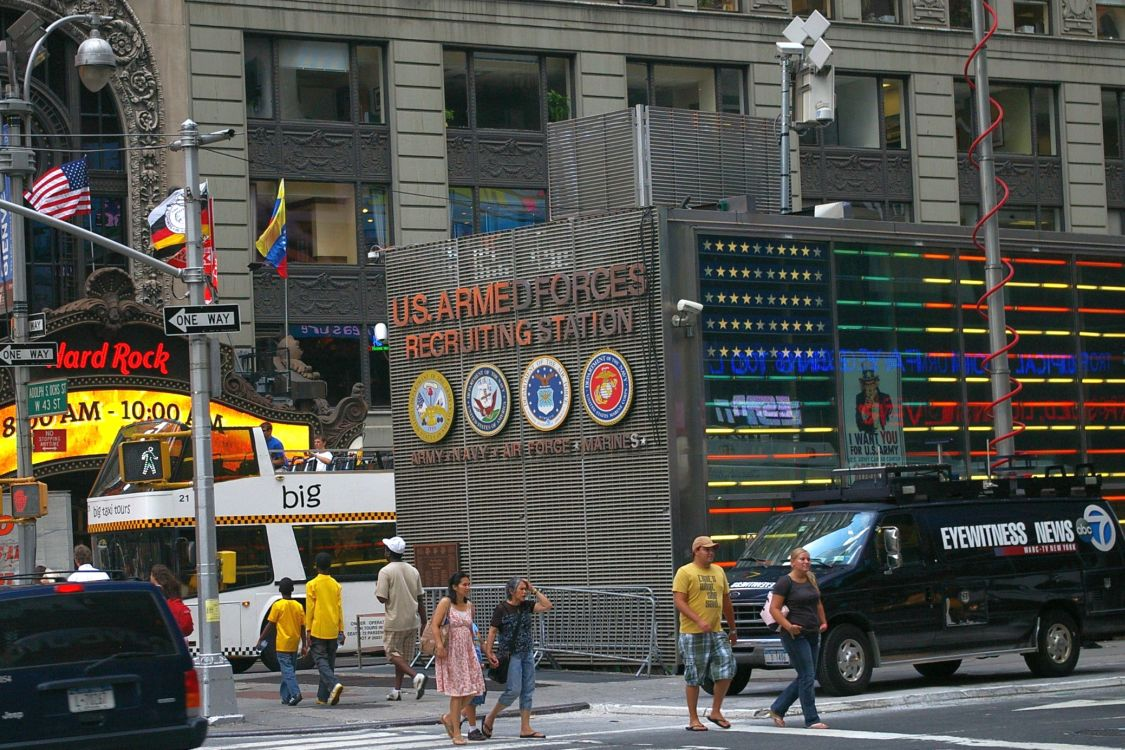
A United States Military recruiting station on Times Square, New York City

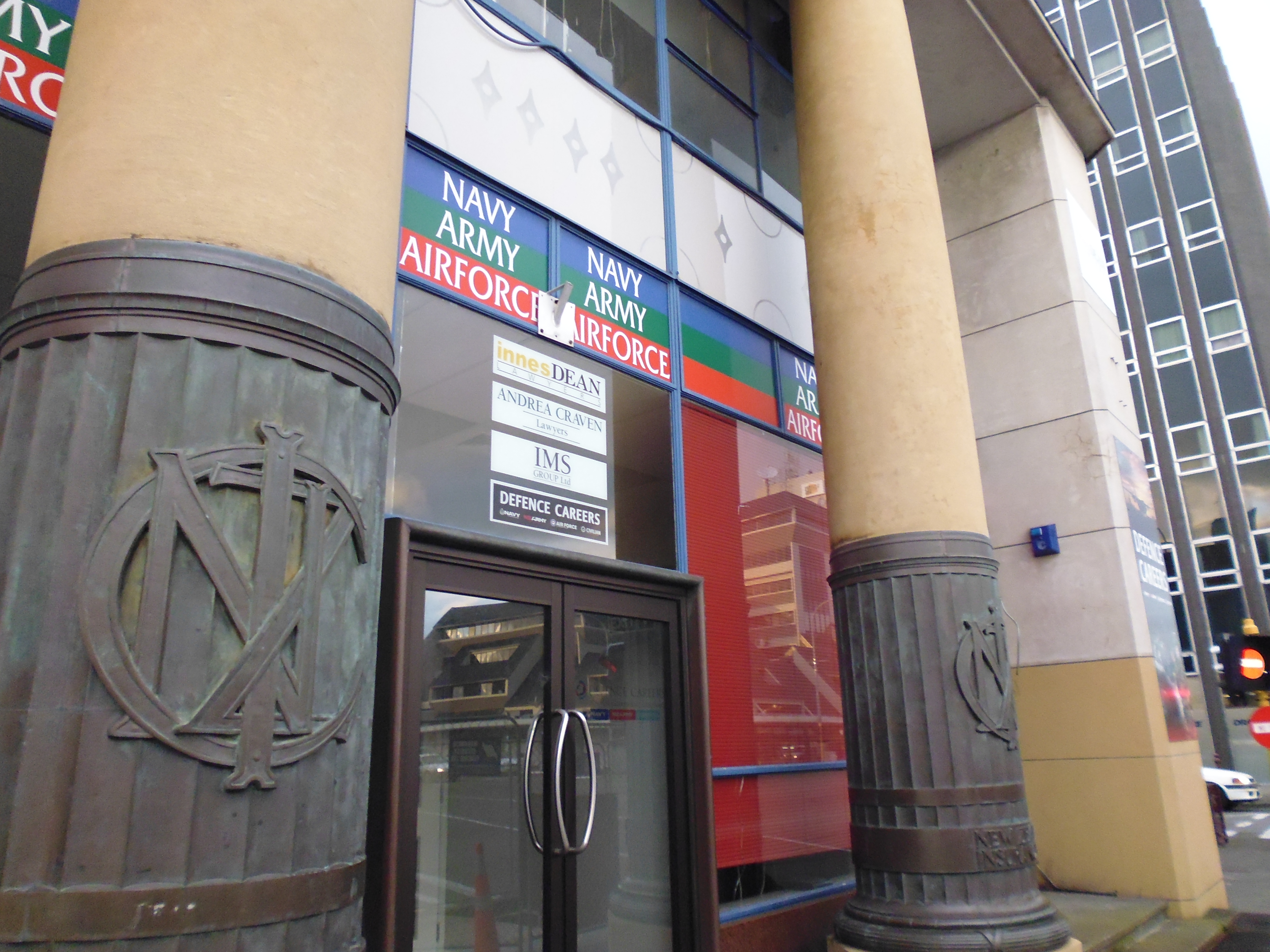
A New Zealand Defence Force recruiting office in Palmerston North, New Zealand

== In India ==
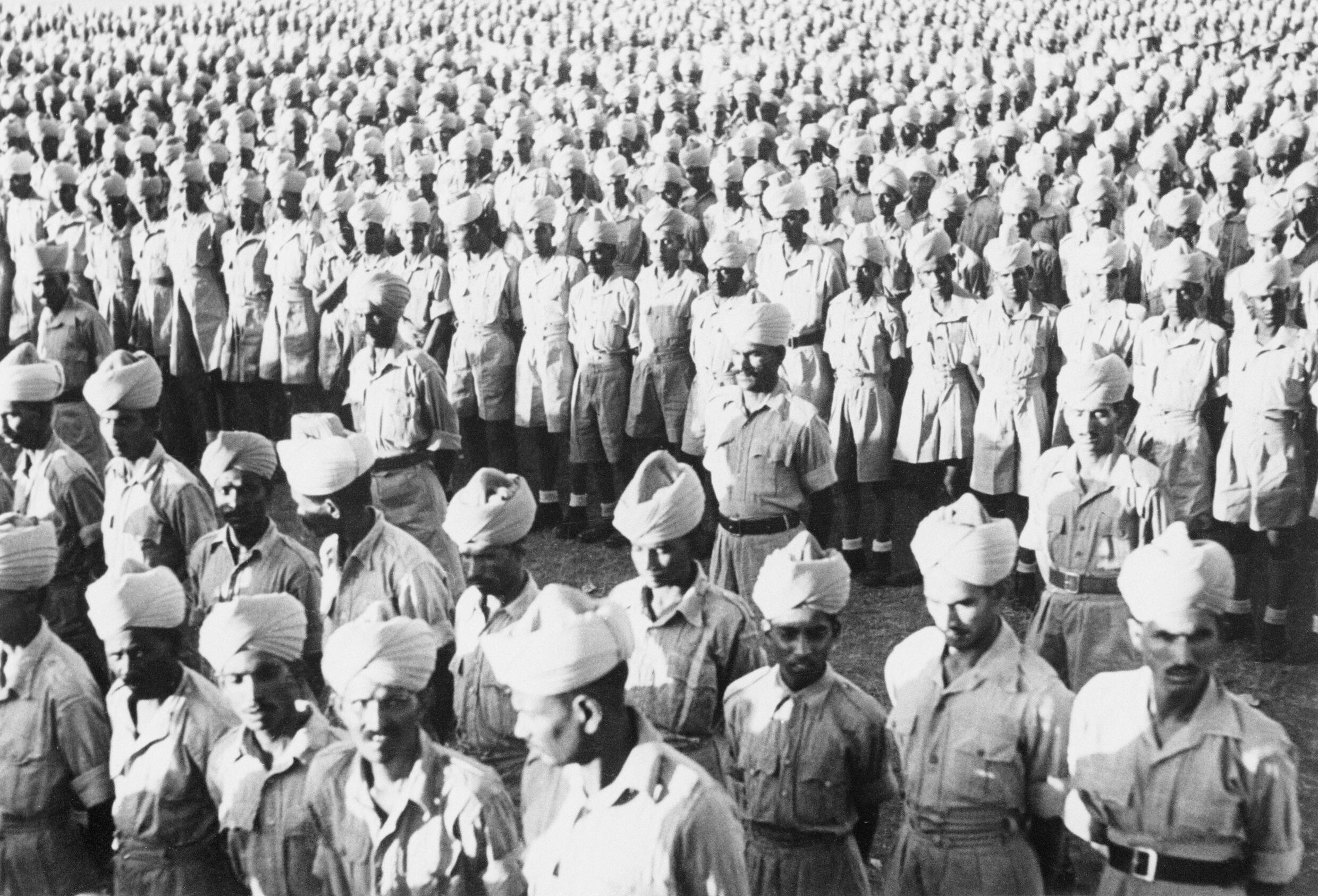
The Indian Army in World War II with over 2.5 million men was the largest volunteer army in history

From the times of the British Raj, recruitment in India has been voluntary. Using Martial Race theory, the British recruited heavily from selected communities for service in the colonial army. The British Indian Army were the largest of the colonial military forces of the British Empire until the Independence and subsequent Partition of India. A volunteer army, it was raised from the native population of India with British officers. The Indian Army served both as a security force in India itself and, particularly during the World Wars, in other theaters. About 1.3 million men served in the First World War. During World War II, the British Indian Army would become the largest volunteer army in history, rising to over 2.5 million men in August 1945.

== In the United Kingdom ==
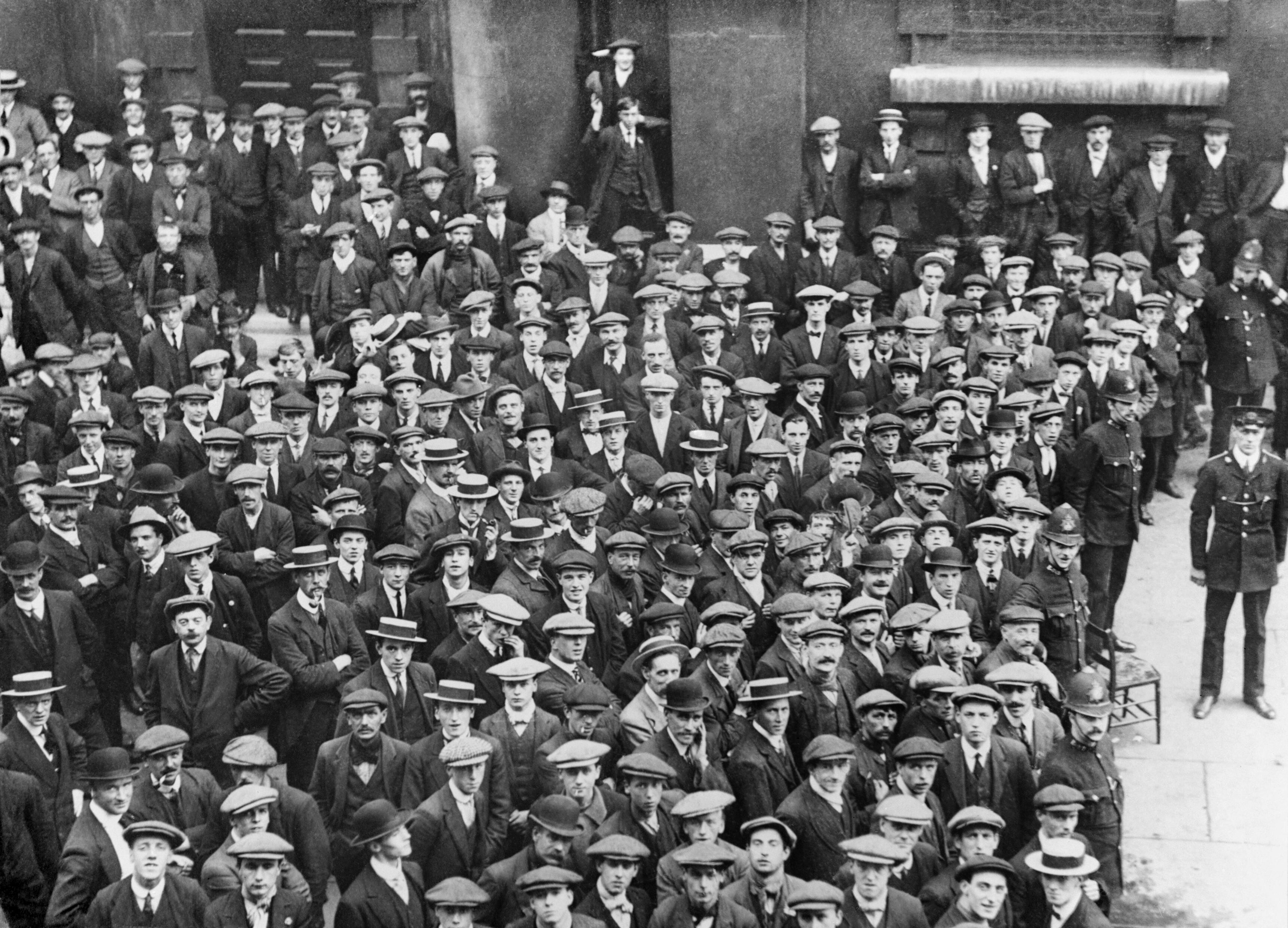
British volunteer recruits in London, August 1914

During both world wars and a period after the second, military service was mandatory for at least some of the British population. At other times, techniques similar to those outlined above have been used. The most prominent concern over the years has been the minimum age for recruitment, which has been 16 for many years. This has now been raised to 18 in relation to combat operations. In recent years, there have been various concerns over the techniques used in (especially) army recruitment in relation to the portrayal of such a career as an enjoyable adventure.

== In the United States ==
The American military has had recruiters since the time of the colonies in the 1700s. Today there are thousands of recruiting stations across the United States, serving the Army, Navy, Marines, and Air Force. Recruiting offices normally consist of 2–8 recruiters between the ranks of E-5 and E-7. When a potential applicant walks into a recruiting station his or her height and weight are checked and their background investigated. A fingerprint scan is conducted and a practice ASVAB exam is given to them. Applicants cannot officially swear their enlistment oath in the recruiting office. This is conducted at a Military Entrance Processing Station (MEPS).

=== Wartime recruitment strategies in the US ===
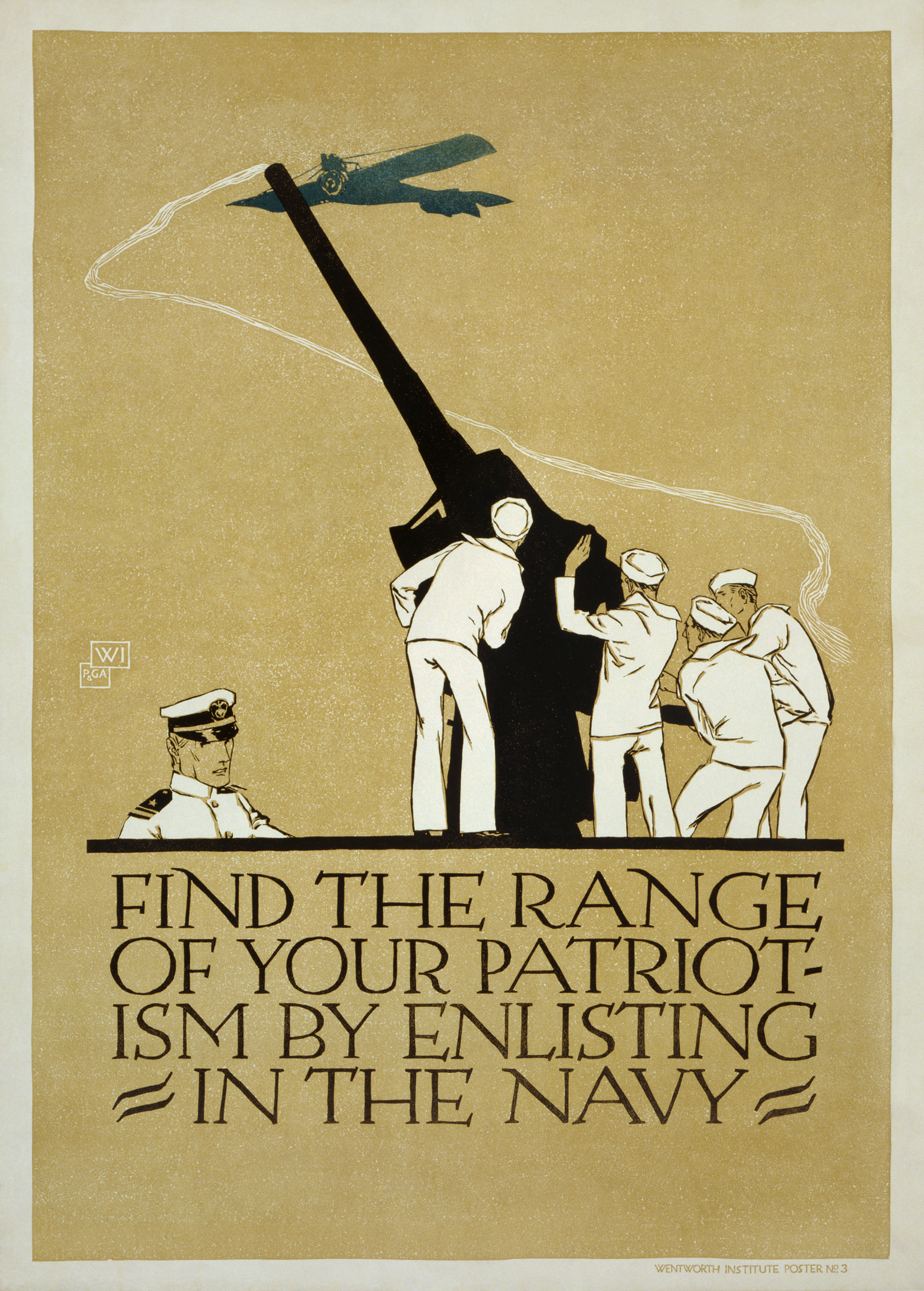
United States Navy recruitment poster from 1918. Note the appeal to patriotism. (Digitally restored).

Prior to the outbreak of World War I, military recruitment in the US was conducted primarily by individual states. Upon entering the war, however, the federal government took an increased role.

The increased emphasis on a national effort was reflected in World War I recruitment methods. Authors Peter A. Padilla and Mary Riege Laner define six basic appeals to these recruitment campaigns: patriotism, job/career/education, adventure/challenge, social status, travel, and miscellaneous. Between 1915 and 1918, 42% of all army recruitment posters were themed primarily by patriotism. And though other themes – such as adventure and greater social status – would play an increased role during World War II recruitment, appeals to serve one's country remained the dominant selling point.

==== Recruitment without conscription ====
In the aftermath of World War II military recruitment shifted significantly. With no war calling men and women to duty, the United States refocused its recruitment efforts to present the military as a career option, and as a means of achieving a higher education. A majority – 55% – of all recruitment posters would serve this end. And though peacetime would not last, factors such as the move to an all-volunteer military would ultimately keep career-oriented recruitment efforts in place. The Defense Department turned to television syndication as a recruiting aid from 1957 to 1960 with a filmed show, Country Style, USA.

On February 20, 1970, the President's Commission on an All-Volunteer Armed Force unanimously agreed that the United States would be best served by an all-volunteer military. In supporting this recommendation, the committee noted that recruitment efforts would have to be intensified, as new enlistees would need to be convinced rather than conscripted. Much like the post-World War II era, these new campaigns put a stronger emphasis on job opportunity. As such, the committee recommended "improved basic compensation and conditions of service, proficiency pay, and accelerated promotions for the highly skilled to make military career opportunities more attractive." These new directives were to be combined with "an intensive recruiting effort." Finalized in mid-1973, the recruitment of a "professional" military was met with success. In 1975 and 1976, military enlistments exceeded expectations, with over 365,000 men and women entering the military. Though this may, in part, have been the result of a lack of civilian jobs during the recession, it nevertheless stands to underline the ways in which recruiting efforts responded to the circumstances of the time.

Indeed, recommendations made by the President's Commission continue to work in present-day recruitment efforts. Understanding the need for greater individual incentive, the US military has re-packaged the benefits of the GI Bill. Though originally intended as compensation for service, the bill is now seen as a recruiting tool. Today, the GI Bill is "no longer a reward for service rendered, but an inducement to serve and has become a significant part of recruiter's pitches."

While uniformed military recruiters screen and process recruits into the military, advertising agencies design and implement military recruitment strategy, campaigns, and advertisements: As of fiscal year 2020, Young & Rubicam was in charge of this for the Navy, Wunderman Thompson for the Marine Corps, DBB Chicago for the Army, and GSD&M for the Air Force.

==== Recruiting methods ====
Recruitment can be conducted over the telephone with organized lists, through email campaigns and from face to face prospecting. While telephone prospecting is the most efficient, face to face prospecting is the most effective. Military recruiters often set up booths at amusement parks, sports stadiums and other attractions. In recent years social media has been more commonly used.

== See also ==
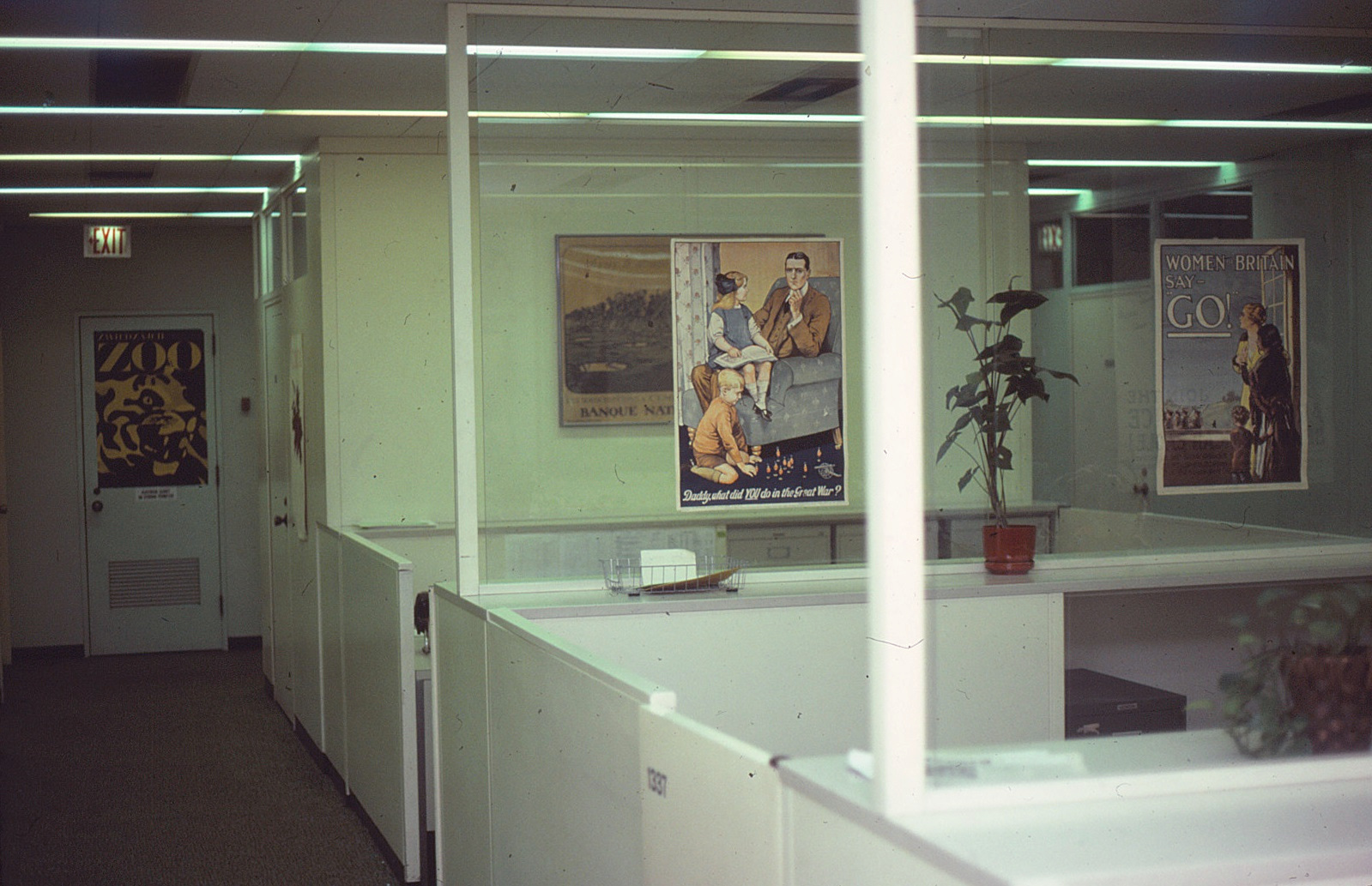
World War I recruitment posters featured as part of the decor at the Institute of War and Peace Studies at Columbia University, as part of understanding the psychological forces behind recruiting efforts

=== Related military articles ===
- Military service
- Women in the military
- Children in the military
- LGBT people and military service
- Transgender people and military service
- Conscription
- Impressment
- Counter-recruitment
- Recruit training
- Military science

=== Recruitment methods and campaigns ===
==== United States ====
- Conscription in the United States
- America's Army (recruitment game)
- Slogans of the United States Army

==== Other countries ====
- UK: Be All You Can Be
- Canada First Defence Strategy
