= US Peace Memorial Foundation =

Florida nonprofit corporation and public charity

- Foundation logo
- Founded: 2005; 21 years ago
- Founder: Michael D. Knox
- Headquarters: United States
- Website: www.uspeacememorial.org

The US Peace Memorial Foundation is a Florida nonprofit corporation and 501(c)(3) public charity. The foundation is based in Palm Harbor, Florida. It publishes the US Peace Registry, annually awards the US Peace Prize, and fundraises to build a memorial in Washington, DC. The foundation's mission is to create a culture of peace by inspiring Americans to speak out against war and militarism and work for peace.

== History ==
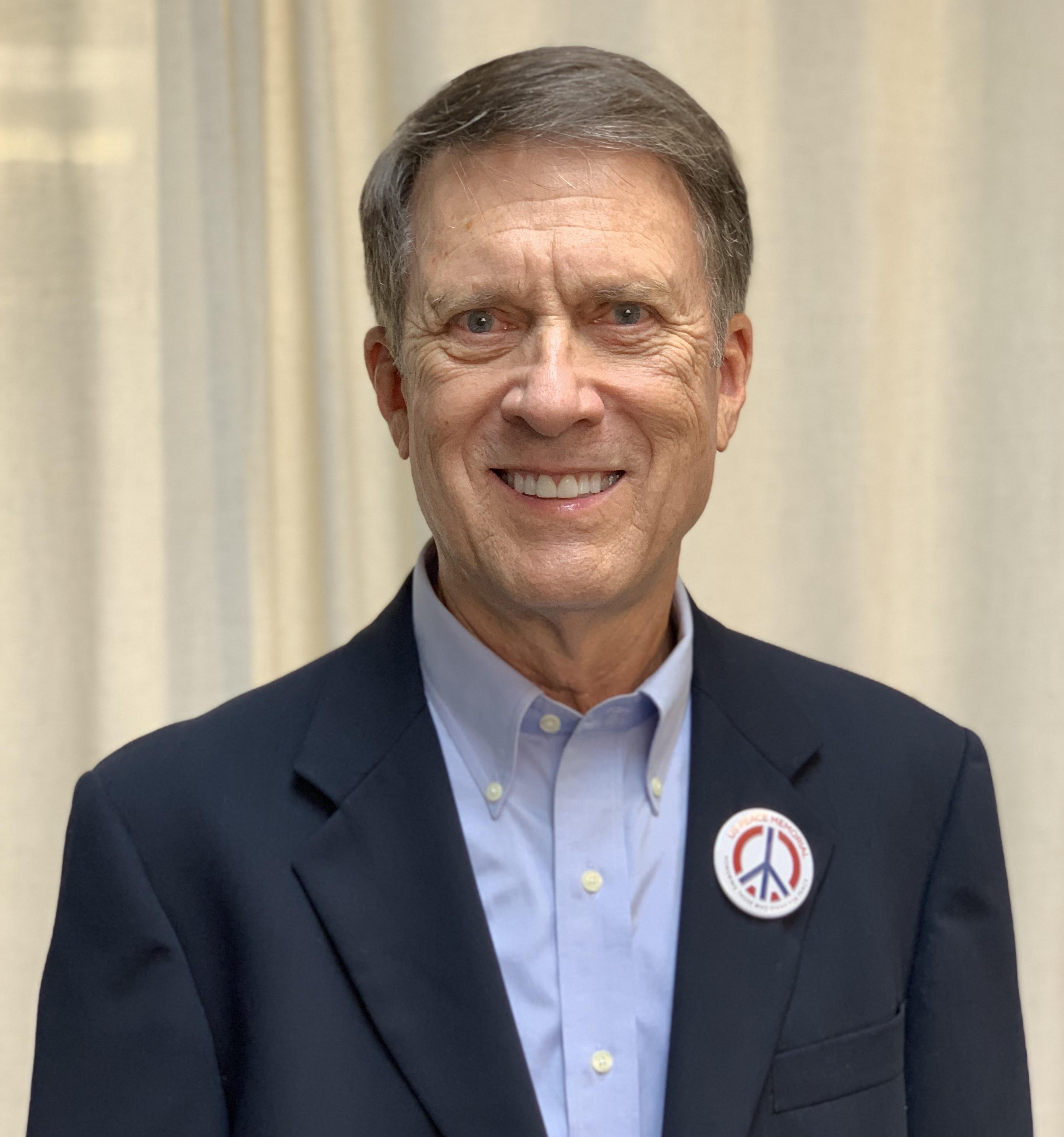
Michael D. Knox in 2019

Michael D. Knox founded the US Peace Memorial Foundation in 2005. It was established as a Florida nonprofit corporation and granted 501(c)(3) public charity status by the IRS. It has awarded the US Peace Prize every year from 2009 to 2024.

== US Peace Registry ==
The foundation maintains the US Peace Registry, which honors individuals and organizations that publicly speak out against warfare and militarization.

== US Peace Prize ==
The foundation awards the US Peace Prize annually to recognize and honor American antiwar leaders. To be considered, the nominee must be a U.S. citizen, permanent resident, or organization; have up-to-date and documented antiwar/peace activities in the US Peace Registry; and be active and prominent in antiwar/peace work within the 16 months before April 30 of the nomination year. It recognizes the "most outstanding and prominent American antiwar leaders." The award's first recipient was Cindy Sheehan in 2009. The mission of the prize is "to inspire other Americans to speak out against war and to work for peace." The award is presented during an annual ceremony. Prize winners receive a plaque, but no monetary award. They are also designated as Founding Members of the foundation. The US Peace Prize has been contrasted to the Nobel Peace Prize and described as one of the nation’s most respected honors for antiwar leadership.

=== Selection process ===
Nominees are selected from those listed in the US Peace Registry and must have documented antiwar activities within the 16-month period leading up to April 30 of the nomination year.

Nominations for the prize are submitted by honorees and founding members of the US Peace Memorial Foundation. The US Peace Memorial Foundation’s Board of Directors chooses the winner.

The 2024 Peace Prize nominees were: Community Peacemaker Teams, Merchants of Death War Crimes Tribunal, Louis H. Pumphrey, and Ellen Thomas.

The final nominees in 2025 were Gerry Condon, Joseph Gerson, National Priorities Project, and Timmon Wallis.

=== Recipients ===
US Peace Prize recipients receive a plaque. This plaque was awarded to the Friends Committee on National Legislation.

These are the people and organizations that have received the US Peace Prize:

Year	Recipient	Recognition
2009	Cindy Sheehan	"Extraordinary and innovative antiwar activism.”
2010	Dennis Kucinich	“In recognition of his national leadership to prevent and end wars.”
2011	Noam Chomsky	“Whose antiwar activities for five decades both educate and inspire.”
2012	Medea Benjamin	"In recognition of her creative leadership on the front lines of the antiwar movement."
2013	Chelsea Manning	“For conspicuous bravery, at the risk of her own freedom, above and beyond the call of duty.”
2014	Code Pink	“In Recognition of Inspirational Antiwar Leadership and Creative Grassroots Activism.”
2015	Kathy Kelly	“For inspiring nonviolence and risking her own life and freedom for peace and the victims of war.”
2016	Veterans for Peace	“In recognition of heroic efforts to expose the causes and costs of war and to prevent and end armed conflict.”
2017	Ann Wright	“For courageous antiwar activism, inspirational peace leadership, and selfless citizen diplomacy.”
2018	David Swanson	“Whose inspiring antiwar leadership, writings, strategies, and organizations help to create a culture of peace.”
2019	Ajamu Baraka	“Whose bold antiwar actions, writings, speeches, and leadership provide an inspiring voice against militarism.”
2020	Christine Ahn	“For bold activism to end the Korean War, heal its wounds, and promote women’s roles in building peace.”
2021	World Beyond War	"For exceptional global advocacy and creative peace education to end war and dismantle the war machine."
2022	Costs of War Project	"For Crucial Research to Shed Light on The Human, Environmental, Economic, Social, and Political Costs of U.S. Wars.”
2023	National Network Opposing the Militarization of Youth	"For National Efforts to Stop U.S. Military Influence on Young People, Saving Lives Here and Abroad."
2024	Friends Committee on National Legislation	"For Efforts Over 81 Years to Educate, Build Coalitions & Influence Congress to Stop Funding War & Nuclear Weapons.”
2025	Gerry Condon	"For more than five decades of courageous resistance to U.S. militarism and nuclear weapons."}

== US Peace Memorial ==
The foundation is raising funds to build the US Peace Memorial in Washington, DC. The monument is to display antiwar statements by famous Americans from all walks of life and include electronic documentation of the activities of citizens who have actively and publicly opposed war and militarism.
