= Central Committee for Conscientious Objectors =

1948–2011 American nonprofit organization

CCCO
- Central Committee for Conscientious Objectors
- Formation: August 1948; 78 years ago
- Founded at: Philadelphia, USA
- Dissolved: 2011; 15 years ago
- Type: Nonprofit
- Tax ID no.: EIN 23-1365199
- Legal status: Charity
- Purpose: Military and draft counseling
- Headquarters: Philadelphia
- Region served: USA
- Key people: Ray Newton; A.J. Muste; Caleb Foote; Lyle Tatum; George Willoughby; Arlo Tatum
- Publication: The Objector
- Website: archives.tricolib.brynmawr.edu/resources/scpc-dg-073
- Remarks: Website summarizes contents of official repository of CCCO records

The Central Committee for Conscientious Objectors (CCCO) was a United States nonprofit organization dedicated to helping people avoid or resist military conscription or seek discharge after voluntary enlistment. It was active in supporting conscientious objectors ("CO's"), war resisters, and draft evaders during the Vietnam War. Founded in Philadelphia in 1948 and dissolved in 2011, CCCO emphasized the needs of secular and activist COs, while other organizations supporting COs principally focused on religious objectors and/or legislative reform and government relations.

With support from the National Service Board for Conscientious Objectors, the American Friends Service Committee, the Brethren Service Commission, the Friends Committee on National Legislation, the War Resisters League and the Fellowship of Reconciliation, CCCO's founders included such notable mid-20th Century American pacifists as David Dellinger, A.J. Muste, George Willoughby, Ray Newton, James E. Bristol, John Mott, Bayard Rustin, Caleb Foote, and Harrop Freeman.

CCCO's first policy achievement was to pressure the Army successfully in 1951 to stop assigning non-combatant COs to mine-laying duties. In 1952, CCCO released the first editions of its publications Handbook for Conscientious Objectors and Conscientious Objectors in the Armed Forces. The first edition of Guide to Conscientious Objection in the Armed Forces was released in 1962. In 1965, under pressure from CCCO and others, the U.S. Department of Defense first established criteria and procedures for granting an honorable discharge to service members who became COs after enlisting or being drafted.

At its largest between about 1966 and 1971, CCCO maintained regional offices and staff in Chicago (est. 1969 as "Midwest Committee on Draft Counseling"), Atlanta (1971―1975), Denver (est. 1972) and San Francisco (est. 1966), in addition to the national office in Philadelphia. It published multiple editions of a Handbook for Conscientious Objectors, the looseleaf (and frequently updated) Draft Counselor's Manual (first edition, 1968), and Advice for Conscientious Objectors in the Armed Forces (by Mike Wittels and CCCO Western Region (first ed., 1970), later updated and revised by other staff, including Robert A. Seeley), and distributed long-time Executive Secretary Arlo Tatum's authoritative Guide to the Draft. CCCO staff trained hundreds of volunteer "draft counselors" throughout the United States to give informed and non-directive advice during the Vietnam era to as many as 10,000 young men exploring their choices in the face of the draft, including such well-known COs as Muhammad Ali and Arlo Guthrie. CCCO also offered counseling to military members opposed to current wars as well as civilians faced with decisions regarding legal requirements for Selective Service registration.

CCCO Western Region, based in San Francisco, was the last regional office to remain open as the organization scaled back after the end of the Vietnam War, and as draft registration without active conscription became the norm in the U.S. after 1980. The Philadelphia office closed in about 1994, having transferred national control of the organization to San Francisco in 1989. In CCCO's final years, the office moved to Oakland, where activities focused on counter-recruitment activism through its "Military Out of Our Schools" program, and production of a youth magazine, AWOL! Youth for Peace and Revolution, in collaboration with the War Resisters League. CCCO's "Third World Outreach Program" focused on the issue of the "poverty draft," viewing impoverished young people, disproportionately people of color, as effectively coerced into military service by a lack of viable options in the civilian economy.

In 2006, CCCO contributed an article/op-ed to the Congressional Digest as part of a policy debate on compulsory national service.

Before its closure, CCCO served as the clearinghouse of the national GI Rights Network, which includes the operation of GI Rights Hotline. Its former counseling role was inherited by the GI Rights Hotline and by the Center on Conscience & War (formerly NISBCO, the National Interreligious Service Board for Conscientious Objectors). Over the years, CCCO also partnered with other groups in its programmatic work including the Military Law Task Force of the National Lawyers Guild and the American Friends Service Committee.

== See also ==
- Laird v. Tatum
- List of anti-war organizations
- List of peace activists
