= National Network Opposing the Militarization of Youth =

Peace organisation in the US

National Network Opposing the Militarization of Youth (NNOMY) is a network of peace organizations that stand up against the militarization of schools and young people in the USA.

== Background ==
NNOMY was founded in 2004 in the aftermath of the national counter-recruitment conference "Stopping War Where it Begins" in Philadelphia. It is intended to be a decentralized and flexible structure that helps national, regional and local activists and organizations by promoting communication efforts and by stimulating collaboration between network members. NNOMY organizes actions and campaigns against militarism in order to raise awareness and to increase education on the topic.

The first steering committee included these organizations:

- Central Committee for Conscientious Objectors;
- Committee for High School Options and Information on Careers, Education and Self-Improvement (CHOICES);
- Committee Opposed to Militarism and the Draft;
- Human Rights Committee, UTLA;
- Madison Area Peace Coalition;
- National Youth & Militarism Program/AFSC;
- Not in Our Name;
- Project YANO;
- Resource Center for Non Violence;
- Teen Peace.

Other participating groups and organizations were Veterans for Peace, Fellowship of Reconciliation, Youth Activists/Youth Allies (NY City) and Los Angeles Coalition Opposed to Militarism in Our Schools. Alliance for Global Justice and War Resisters League sponsor actions of the network.

== Campaigns ==
=== A National Call: Save Our Civilian Public Education ===
This campaign was started in opposition to conservative forces in the Pentagon and of corporate influence on the learning environments of the K-12 and public universities. As a result of the campaign, in 2009, JROTC firing ranges at 11 high schools were shut down by the efforts of students, their parents and teachers. Similar successes were achieved later in Hawaii and Maryland.

=== Divest “Your Body” from the War Machine ===
This project, organized in collaboration with CODEPINK, had the goal to remove invested assets from companies, which supplied and profited from militarization. The campaign wanted to provide broader opportunities to young people who look for community service alternatives to the military.

=== School Marksmanship Training ===
In collaboration with the project YANO, NNOMY promoted the removal of marksmanship programs and shooting ranges from schools. Some of the accomplishments of the campaign are:

- end of placing students in JROTC involuntarily;
- significant reduction of Marine Corps JROTC enrollment;
- removal of shooting ranges from 11 schools in the San Diego.

=== Winning The Peace ===
This was a national leafletting campaign, directed to acquaint youth with the reality of military enlistment and alternative opportunities to the military service.

=== Veterans For Peace and Counter-recruiting ===
This project is for raising public concern about Pentagon's militarization efforts on youth by providing personal experience of veterans and other activists.

=== Women's March on the Pentagon ===
The March was held on 21 October 2018 and opposed the Pentagon's influence on live of youth, especially its programs JROTC, Young Marines, DoD Starbase and DoD STEM.

== The US Peace Prize ==
In 2023, the National Network Opposing the Militarization of Youth was awarded The US Peace Prize by the US Peace Memorial Foundation "for National Efforts to Stop U.S. Military Influence on Young People, Saving Lives Here and Abroad."
