= Friends Committee on National Legislation =

US nonprofit advocacy organization

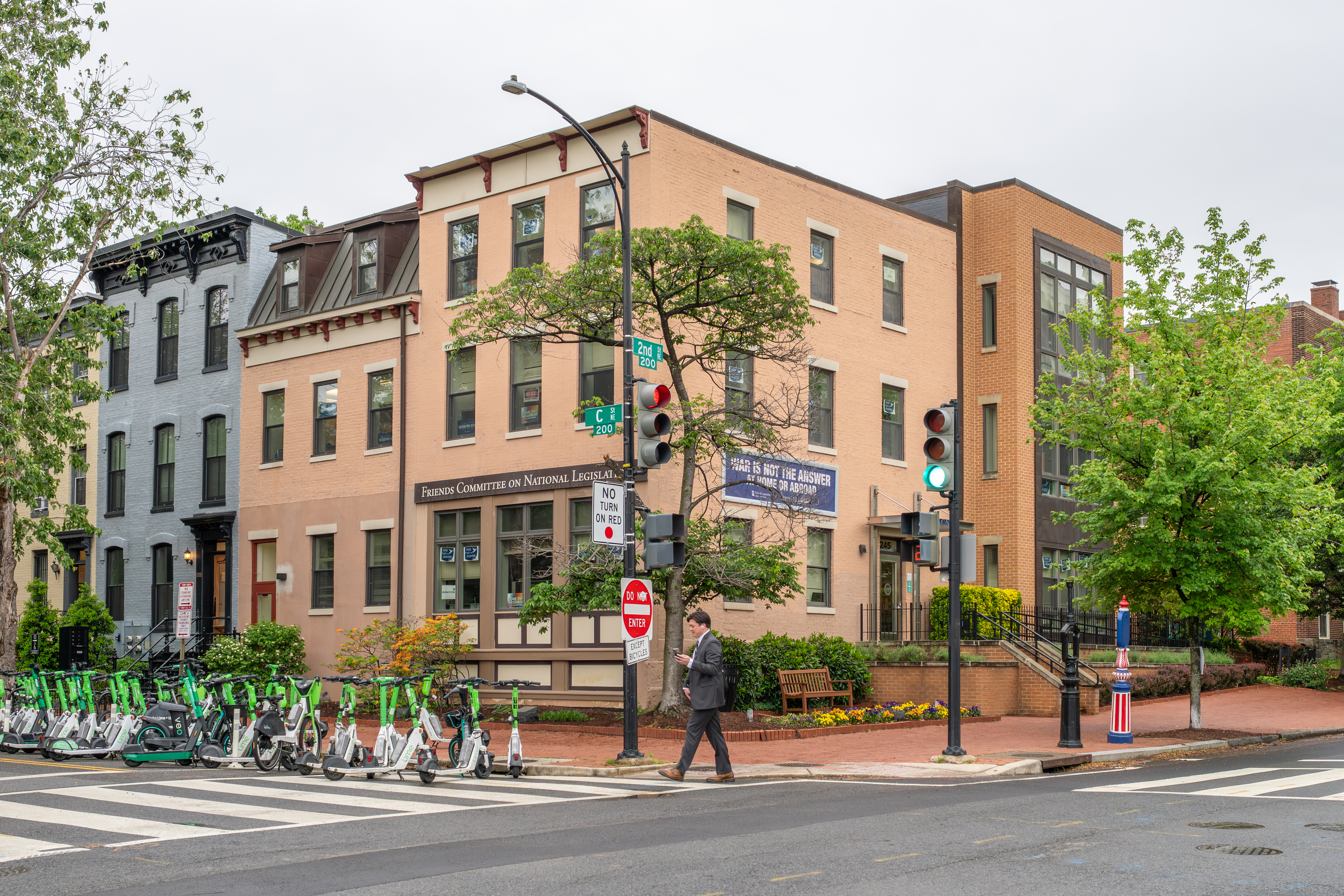
- Headquarters in Washington, D.C.
- Formation: 1943
- Type: Non-profit corporation
- Headquarters: Washington, D.C.
- Region served: United States
- General Secretary: Bridget Moix
- Staff: 50–60
- Website: fcnl.org

The Friends Committee on National Legislation (FCNL) is a national nonprofit, nonpartisan Quaker organization. As a 501(c)(4) advocacy organization, FCNL and its network lobby Congress and the administration to promote peace, justice, and environmental stewardship. It was founded in 1943 by members of the Religious Society of Friends (Quakers).

FCNL leads coalitions, such as the Prevention and Protection Working Group, and working groups affiliated with the Washington Interfaith Staff Coalition.

== Quaker lobbying ==
FCNL's approach to lobbying is grounded in Quaker faith and practice. In the mid-seventeenth century, Friends were activists out of necessity. Their refusal to obey laws that they believed were not of God led to imprisonment, confiscation of goods, and execution. A hallmark of Quaker interaction with government is the use of persuasion rather than coercion and violence.

FCNL fields one of the largest faith-based lobbies in Washington, D.C. Its work is supported by a grassroots network of thousands of advocates all over the country. In 42 states and the District of Columbia, many of the grassroots advocates have formed themselves into Advocacy Teams. As of 2021, there were more than 120 such teams, involving more than 1,500 grassroots advocates. Advocates visit the offices of members of Congress and write letters or speak through local media to catalyze federal change.

The US Peace Prize plaque awarded to FCNL in 2024

FCNL was the 2024 recipient of The US Peace Prize "For Efforts Over 81 Years to Educate, Build Coalitions & Influence Congress to Stop Funding War & Nuclear Weapons."

== Legislative policy approach ==
FCNL's approach draws on the expertise of registered lobbyists in Washington, D.C., the work of advocates around the country and relationships cultivated with elected officials and community leaders. The business practice of the Religious Society of Friends is one that seeks for participants to come to unity. FCNL's General Committee follows this practice in determining legislative policy and priorities, a discernment process they undertake every two years or for every new session of Congress.

=== Policy positions during the 117th Congress (2021–2023) ===
- Promote Peacebuilding by emphasizing diplomacy and honoring treaties and by working towards peaceful prevention and resolution of violent conflict, especially in the Middle East.
- Confront the paradigm of global militarism, demilitarize space, reduce military spending, limit the spread of conventional weapons, prevent armed interventions, repeal the Authorizations for Use of Military Force (AUMFs), and reassert Congress' oversight role.
- Promote nuclear disarmament and non-proliferation.
- Advocate for a just and equitable justice system that eliminates mass incarceration and police brutality, and establishes law-enforcement that is community-oriented and demilitarized.
- Ensure that the U.S. immigration system promotes and respects the rights, safety, humanity, and dignity of all immigrants, refugees, and migrants.
- Promote equitable access for all citizens to participation in an open and transparent political process, protect the integrity of our democratic institutions and processes, and work to ensure honesty and accountability of elected and appointed officials.
- End gun violence by supporting policies that are informed by public health best practices.
- Witness and advocate for American Indian, Alaska Native, and Native Hawaiian rights and concerns. Honor the treaties and promises.
- Address structural economic inequality through measures such as a fair and progressive tax system, a living wage for all, and an adequate social safety net.
- Prioritize programs that meet basic needs including universal access to quality affordable healthcare, a necessity magnified by the COVID-19 pandemic.
- Strengthen environmental protections and advance environmental justice, while recognizing the finite capacity of the earth and the need to protect human, animal and plant diversity.
- Advance sustainable, science-based solutions to the climate crisis and prioritize international cooperation to achieve global sustainability goals and protect vulnerable populations.

== History and impact ==
During the discussions in the US in 1940 regarding World War II, Quakers opposed the war as a matter of conscience. Friends from 22 Yearly Meetings came to Richmond, Indiana, a city that has historically embraced Quaker values, for a conference to address the national draft. This conference set the stage for a subsequent gathering of 52 Quakers in Richmond from June 11–12, 1943. That gathering gave birth to the Friends Committee on National Legislation (FCNL) to influence U.S. government decisions related to war and peace.

FCNL's advocacy in solidarity with Native Americans and Alaska Natives dates back to 1956 when the government finalized its plans to prevent flooding in Pittsburgh by building the Kinzua Dam to divert the Allegheny River. The Seneca Nation lost 10,000 acres of its Allegany Territory.

The organization's subsequent work with Native Americans was based largely on a series of consultations by a group equally made up of tribal and yearly meeting representatives. These consultations led to opposition to the U.S. government's termination policy that ended federal recognition of many tribes as government entities. It catalyzed grassroots support for adequate funding for schools and healthcare (e.g., the Indian Health Care Improvement Act (P.L. 94-437) to improve the Indian Health Service), for the Alaska Native Claims Settlement Act (P.L. 92-203), and for oil rights for the Osage Nation. In 2017, FCNL started a Native American Advocacy Program led by a young Native American. Its focus has largely been on the reauthorization of the Violence Against Women Act.

FCNL's first 30 years were also marked by efforts to stop violent conflict around the world and address root causes. Its legislative policy is rooted in the belief that there is that of God in every person. This belief has fueled the Quakers' longstanding Peace Testimony—promoting peace and refraining from violence and actively opposing war. Peace testimony has governed FCNL's work to prevent war, minimize the threat of war, and promote peace since its beginning.

From providing relief to Europe during and after World War II, defeating congressional proposals for mandatory military training for young men, and opposing civil defense measures to playing a significant role in the creation of the Peace Corps in 1961, FCNL has remained steadfast in its commitment to the peace testimony, manifested by ending and preventing war.

FCNL has opposed nuclear weapons since their creation. During the Cuban Missile Crisis, FCNL called for United Nations negotiations rather than military intervention to mitigate the possibility of tensions escalating to war. FCNL's advocacy was key to the establishment of the Treaty on the Non-Proliferation of Nuclear Weapons in 1968, which went into effect in 1970 and was extended indefinitely in 1995.

Throughout the 1960s and 1970s, FCNL was an active opponent of the Vietnam War. Disillusioned and frustrated with the war, young Quakers urged FCNL to establish an internship program in 1970 as an alternate form of public service. Since its inception, hundreds of recent graduates have spent 11 months at FCNL learning to advocate, developing leadership skills, and enriching Quaker lobbying.

In 1974, Edward Snyder (FCNL's Executive Secretary from 1962 to 1990) led efforts to cancel the appropriation of $474 million to the South Vietnamese military, expediting an end to the U.S. war in Vietnam.

In the 1970s, FCNL was an early advocate for sustainable development and reducing harmful impacts on the environment. During that decade, FCNL accelerated its focus on human rights and continued advocating for peace. The organization also became vocal on energy and nuclear power, emphasizing conservation, renewable energy resources, and a moratorium on construction of new nuclear power plants. These efforts would continue throughout the 1980s, as FCNL also increased its advocacy for economic justice.

In the 1980s, FCNL lobbied the U.S. government in the lead-up to the 1986 Reykjavik Summit. The summit between President Ronald Reagan and Soviet Union President Mikhail Gorbachev signaled the thawing of U.S.-Soviet relations and ended the stalled nuclear disarmament negotiations between the two countries. The 1986 Reykjavik Summit paved the way for the 1987 INF Treaty and the 1991 START I Treaties, as well as limitations on nuclear testing.

During the 1980s, the World Bank turned to FCNL as an organization at the forefront of addressing the inextricable links between the environment and global poverty. That same decade, FCNL's Ruth Flower also chaired the Domestic Human Needs Working Group of Interfaith Action for Economic Justice, central in the welfare reform debate in Congress. FCNL also led other faith groups in advocating for more generous and less punitive legislation.

By the 1990s, FCNL's influence and capacity to change public policy increased. It worked to shift budget priorities away from military spending to support international organizations and diplomacy, reform the U.S. healthcare system, advocate for Native American rights, curtail the global weapons trade, and respond to national and international crises.

In 1992, FCNL was instrumental in helping to ratify the U.N. Convention on Chemical Weapons. This U.N. arms control treaty outlaws the production and use of chemical weapons and leads to the destruction of 93% of the world's declared stockpile of chemical weapons. Since 1993, FCNL has also led the coalition of NGOs and advocacy groups working to develop a strict set of arms export criteria that would prevent nations from providing military assistance or exporting weapons to countries engaged in abusive practices.

The day after the September 11, 2001 terrorist attacks, FCNL issued a statement discouraging the U.S. government from responding with violence. The "War is not the Answer" slogan would shape FCNL's legislative policy throughout the decade. Two days after that, Congress turned over to the president its constitutional power to decide whether and when the U.S. enters military conflict. Since then, lawmakers have twice invoked the War Powers Act of 1973, which was intended to check the president's power to commit the United States to an armed conflict without congressional consent.

The 2001 Authorization for Use of Military Force (AUMF)—the law behind the "War on Terror"—has given four administrations expansive and endless war-making powers. The 2002 AUMF served as the ultimate basis for U.S. military action against the Saddam Hussein regime in Iraq. FCNL lobbyists continues to advocate for resolutions to "cancel the blank check for war" by restoring Congress' power to determine whether and when the U.S. goes to war.

For more than ten years, FCNL has encouraged a shift from violent, reactionary responses to peaceful conflict resolution and diplomacy. It also advocated for reductions and alternatives to increased military spending, urged Congress to put an end to the war in Yemen, and successfully lobbied for the prevention of atrocities and genocide. FCNL was key to the passage of the Elie Wiesel Genocide and Atrocities Prevention Act (P.L. 115–441), which passed in 2018 and became law in 2019. The bill ensures coordination among U.S. government departments to prevent global atrocities from occurring and mandates training for American diplomats to identify early warning signs of genocide.

FCNL lobbied for the Iran nuclear deal, including the 2015 Join Comprehensive Plan of Action.

After several years of FCNL's lobbying for legislation to demilitarize police, President Obama announced in 2015 that the federal government will no longer provide certain military equipment to local police forces.

In December 2018, President Trump signed the First Step Act (P.L. 115- 391) into law, reducing sentences for non-violent crimes and improving rehabilitation for those in prison. In February 2019, the House of Representatives passed the Bipartisan Background Checks Act; FCNL had coordinated lobbying of more than 50 faith groups to ensure the bill's passage. Two months later, the House voted to reauthorize the Violence Against Women Act, including FCNL-backed provisions to strengthen protection for Native women and children.

Throughout its history, FCNL has also lobbied on federal appropriations, making sure new laws are properly funded. It is also vocal in opposing the superfluous funding of laws that conflict with organization's mission at the expense of equity, justice, peace, or the environment.

=== Brick and mortar ===
In 2005, FCNL made good on its commitment to restore and transform its historic Capitol Hill office, becoming the first LEED-certified building on Capitol Hill. In 2020, the U.S. Green Building Council upgraded the FCNL's rating from silver to platinum, its highest level.

In 2011, FCNL purchased the adjoining row house, on 205 C Street. The organization renovated it using the same green principles used in FCNL's main building. It was re-opened in 2017.

In 2019, the FCNL Education Fund assumed management and governance of the William Penn House. In 2020, it was renamed the Friends Place on Capitol Hill. In renaming it, the board was mindful that William Penn enslaved people. The building, finished in 1917, was purchased by the Friends Meeting in Washington in 1966 to advance Quaker efforts on Capitol Hill. Shortly after acquiring it, the FCNL Education Fund undertook major repairs to modernize Friends Place. Today, it is a guesthouse and learning center.

== Organization ==
=== Governance and funding ===
FCNL is governed by a General Committee of approximately 180 Friends, the majority of whom have been appointed by 26 Yearly Meetings and 7 national Friends' organizations. The General Committee meets to conduct business at the organization's Annual Meeting. Seven standing committees oversee the program and administration of FCNL between Annual Meetings.

The majority of FCNL's budget comes from individual donations. FCNL is also supported by contributions from Quaker meetings and churches (including Yearly Meetings and Quarterly Meetings), foundations, bequests, and endowments.

=== Leadership and staff ===
Starting January 24, 2022, Bridget Moix assumed her role as FCNL's fifth general secretary, assisted by five associate general secretaries. The five associate general secretaries are Adlai Amor for communications, Lauren Brownlee for community and culture, Stephen Donahoe for development, Amelia Kegan for policy and advocacy, and Thomas Swindell for finance and operations.

Moix is preceded by Diane Randall, FCNL's first female general secretary, who served for ten years (2011–2021). Previous FCNL chief executives are: E. Raymond Wilson (1943–1962), Ed Snyder (1962–1990), and Joe Volk (1990–2011).

There are more than 60 full-time staff and consultants working at FCNL.
