= Ernie Regehr =

Ernie Regehr, OC is a Canadian peace researcher and expert in security and disarmament. He co-founded Project Ploughshares, a peace research organization based in Waterloo, Ontario, with Murray Thomson in 1976 and served as its Executive Director for thirty years. Project Ploughshares is an ecumenical project supported by the Canadian Council of Churches. Regehr has been a Canadian NGO representative and expert advisor at numerous international disarmament forums including UN Conferences on Small Arms.

Regehr is currently a Research Fellow at the Institute for Peace and Conflict Studies at Conrad Grebel University College (Waterloo, Ontario) and The Simons Foundation (Vancouver, BC). He also serves on the board of directors of the Africa Peace Forum in Kenya.

== Project Ploughshares ==
After receiving his Bachelor of Arts in English from the University of Waterloo in 1968, Regehr worked in journalism and for a member of Parliament, during which time he wrote his first book Making a Killing: Canada’s Arms Industry. Regehr and his wife Nancy then served with Mennonite Central Committee in South Africa, Zambia and Botswana from 1974-1976 before returning to Canada.

Remarking on his experiences in southern Africa, Regehr noted:

As newly independent countries, Zambia and Botswana were determined, as were other newly independent states in Africa, to assemble modern armed forces, with jet fighters, tanks and all the rest of the military paraphernalia that was assumed to be essential to modern security forces – all supplied by the arms factories of the North. At the same time, it was obvious that the long-term viability of those states would depend on their capacity to provide for the human security of their citizens – education, health care and the economic wherewithal to meet daily needs of food and shelter. Tanks and jet fighters were not going to deliver human security; in fact they were an obvious impediment to reaching such goals. When we returned to Canada, Nancy and I retained our interest in the issues framed through the African experience and I explored the possibility of doing some research and writing on the theme of militarism and underdevelopment – notably, the role of the international arms trade with the third world as an impediment to social and economic development.

In 1976, Regehr contacted Murray Thompson, who was the Executive Director of CUSO (then known as Canadian University Service Overseas). The two began a research project on militarism and underdevelopment, and co-founded Project Ploughshares as an organizational extension to this research on July 1, 1976.

== Awards ==
Regehr’s peace and security work has been honoured with a number of awards. He was named an Officer of the Order of Canada in 2003, and in January 2011 he became the 26th laureate of the Pearson Peace Medal. Regehr was also a recipient of the University of Waterloo 50th Anniversary Alumni Award in 2007 and the Arthur Kroeger College Award for Ethics in Public Affairs in 2008.

== Works ==
Regehr has written a number of books and articles about peace and security issues. His publications include:

- Making a Killing: Canada's Arms Industry. McClelland and Stewart. 1975. ISBN 978-0771074387.
- Perceptions of Apartheid: The churches and political change in South Africa. Scottsdale, PA: Herald Press. 1979. ISBN 978-0836118995.
- Militarism and the World Military Order. World Council of Churches. 1980.
- Canada and the Nuclear Arms Race. Co-edited with Simon Rosenblum. James Lorimer and Company. 1983. ISBN 978-0888626356.
- Arms Canada: The Deadly Business of Military Exports. James Lorimer and Company. 1987. ISBN 978-0888629593.
- The Road to Peace. Co-edited with Simon Rosenblum. James Lorimer and Company. 1988. ISBN 978-1550280395.
- "Canada and the Arms Trade Treaty" (PDF). Behind the Headlines. 64 (6). The Canadian Institute of International Affairs/The Centre for International Governance Innovation. 2007. Archived from the original (PDF) on 2012-01-08.

Regehr has also written numerous articles in newspapers, reports and scholarly journals.

== See also ==
- List of peace activists
