= Pro =

Pro is an abbreviation meaning "professional".

Pro, PRO or variants thereof might also refer to:

== People ==
- Miguel Pro (1891–1927), Mexican priest
- Pro Hart (1928–2006), Australian painter
- Mlungisi Mdluli (born 1980), South African retired footballer
- Derek Minor (born 1984), American Christian rapper, formerly known as PRo
- Mike Awesome (1965–2007), a.k.a. The Pro, American wrestler Michael Lee Alfonso
- Pro Wells, American football player

== Occupations ==
- Prostitute, slang abbreviation
- Public relations officer

== Linguistics ==
- PRO (linguistics) ("big PRO")
- pro (linguistics) ("little pro")

== Political parties ==
- Propuesta Republicana (Republican Proposal), Argentina
- Partido Progresista de Chile, (Progressive Party), Chile
- Právo Respekt Odbornost (Law, Respect, Expertise), Czech Republic
- Partei Rechtsstaatlicher Offensive (Party for a Rule of Law Offensive), former German party
- Progresīvie (The Progressives), Latvia
- Pro Moldova, 2020–2023 name of the Modern Democratic Party in Moldova
- Progressief Nederland (Progressive Netherlands), merger of Labour Party and GroenLinks in the Netherlands
- PRO România (PRO Romania)
- Пропозиція (Proposition), Ukraine
- Pro-Bewegung (Pro-movement), Germany

== Organizations ==
- Pensionärernas riksorganisation, the Swedish National Pensioners’ Organisation
- Performance rights organisation
- Producer Responsibility Organisation
- Professional Referee Organization, for North American soccer
- Provincial Research Organization, Canadian initiatives
- Public Record Office
- Public Record Office - of Northern Ireland
- Public Record Office Victoria
- Public.Resource.Org, public domain publisher

== Science and technology ==
- iPad Pro, a line of tablet computers by Apple Inc.
- MacBook Pro, a line of laptop computers by Apple Inc.
- PRO (category theory), in mathematics
- .pro, a top-level Internet domain
- pro-, a prefix used in taxonomy
- Patient-reported outcome, in clinical trials
- Pressure-retarded osmosis
- Pro (or P), an abbreviation for proline, an amino acid
- Protein Ontology, a Protein Information Resource database

== Entertainment ==
- Pasadena Roof Orchestra, England
- The Pro (TV series), with Rob Lowe
- The Pro (comics)

== Other uses ==
- SIG Pro, a pistol series
- Public Record Office, UK
- Pro TV, Romania
