= Military policy =

Public policy on military activities

Military policy (also called defence policy or defense policy) is public policy dealing with multinational security and the military. It comprises the measures and initiatives that governments do or do not take in relation to decision-making and strategic goals, such as when and how to commit national armed forces.

Military policy is used to ensure the retention of independence in national development and the alleviation of hardships imposed from hostile and aggressive external actors. The Defence Ministry (or a synonymous organisation) is the primary decision-maker for the national military policy.

== Purpose ==
Military policy identifies threats of hostility and aggression based on intelligence analysis, and defines military scope of national security, defense alliances, combat readiness, military organisation of national forces and their use of military technology.

The national military policy defines the national defense strategy, the "when" of committing national armed forces. The national military policy also defines the strategic posture, the "how", towards any possible threats to national territory, its society, environment, and economy, and defines options available to deal with such threats. The more options a military policy provides to the government, the better it is considered in its formulation. Strategic posture in turn defines the military doctrine of the armed forces. This doctrine may include confronting threats to national interests located outside of the national territory such as shipping lanes. The defense strategy and military doctrine are developed through strategic policy and capability development processes.

== Development ==
A military policy is created through the military policy process of making important organisational decisions, including the identification of priorities and different alternatives such as defence personnel and technology programs or budget priorities, and choosing among them on the basis of the impact they will have on the overall national development. Defence policies can be understood as political, management, financial, administrative and executable mechanisms arranged to reach explicit military goals and objectives.

== Applications ==
Military policy addresses the achievement of its military goals and objectives by making explicit statements about the desired capability in: combat readiness, military organization, political-military relationships (civilian control of the military), the role of the armed forces, command and control, military intelligence and counterintelligence, defence diplomacy, defence capability in terms of (technology, mobility, materiel, and logistics), block obsolescence, professionalism and training, recruiting, social change in the military, standing forces, military reserve forces, and conscriptions.

Military policy differs from rules of engagement which determine when, where, and how military force is to be used by formations and units.

== See also ==
- Capability management
- National security
- Defence Diplomacy
- Small arms proliferation
- European Union arms embargo on the People's Republic of China
- List of National Defense Industries
- Private military company
- Campaign Against Arms Trade
- Canadian Arms trade
- List of countries by military expenditures
- Permanent arms economy
- Military funding of science
- Military-industrial complex
- Military Keynesianism
- Peace dividend
- Guns versus butter model
- Gunboat diplomacy
- Al Yamamah arms deal
- Arms control
- Defense policy of Japan
