= Martin Connell =

Martin Connell may refer to:

- Martin Connell (businessman), Canadian businessman
- Martin Connell (Royal Navy officer) (born 1968), Royal Navy officer
