= Ibero-American Model Forest Network =

Regional network of model forests

The Ibero-American Model Forest Network (RIABM) is the regional network representing the 29 Model Forests across the Caribbean, Latin America and Spain.

== History ==
During the United Nations Conference on Environment and Development in Rio de Janeiro in 1992, countries agreed that there was an urgent need to find real, practical and sustainable solutions to the great environmental challenges that our planet faced. At this time, Canada invited the rest of the world to put into practice the Model Forest approach and created the IMFN to facilitate the exchange of knowledge and experiences.

The IMFN provides Model Forests in partner countries access to certain opportunities such as the exchange of experiences and the promotion of good governance. This, in turn, increases regional knowledge and the development of strategic initiatives. In addition, the network strengthens the link between regional and global forest policy initiatives and provides an avenue for international donors to fund conservation projects in each country.

== About RIABM ==
The Ibero-American Model Forest Network (RIABM) aims to be a regional benchmark for the sustainable management of forest-based landscapes. It promotes cooperation among Model Forests, institutions and member countries based on knowledge exchange and innovative experiences, and contributes to public policies related to the sustainable management of natural resources.

It is the first voluntary regional organization to be created that brings together 15 countries and 29 Model Forests in Central and South America, the Caribbean and Spain to share knowledge and experiences. The RIABM promotes the sustainable management of forest-based landscapes and connects Model Forests of member countries.

=== Strategic objectives ===
The strategic objectives of the RIABM are:

1. To consolidate the Model Forest, promote regional Model Forest network expansion and facilitate horizontal collaboration among sites.
2. To strengthen the RIABM’s capacity to provide support to its members and to achieve its financial sustainability.
3. To share knowledge and transfer technology through technical horizontal collaboration, dissemination of information on best practices and other relates activities.
4. To contribute to sectoral and multisectoral processes of public policies formulation, implementation and evaluation related with the sustainable management of forest-based landscapes.

=== Governance Platforms ===
Model Forests are in essence governance platforms. They function as territorial management systems that are inclusive to all stakeholders in a community. Each Model Forest has the liberty to define how it will function, as long as it adheres to the Principles and Attributes agreed to by all Model Forests;

Principle 1. Broad-base Partnership

Principle 2. Large Landscape

Principle 3. Commitment to Sustainability

Principle 4. Participatory Governance

Principle 5. A Broad Program of Activities

Principle 6. Commitment to Knowledge Sharing, Capacity Building and Networking

Their multilateral approach to governance distinguishes Model Forests from both top-down and bottom-up approaches. The desire to remain neutral and independent has allowed Model Forests to connect with all stakeholders. One of the rising trends within this model is their focus on forging alliances at multiple levels. Currently, there are 6 regional Model Forest network around the globe, all of which are members of the International Model Forest Network. Each of these regional networks facilitates the communication between local groups with members across the region and even across the globe. By hosting board meetings, capacity development workshops and overseeing project interventions, these networks are facilitating the development of cohesive and sustainable development projects.

== Members ==
=== Model Forests ===
Country	Model Forest	Year of Affiliation	Area (hectares)	Population
Argentina	Formoseño	2000	800,000	27,400
Argentina	Futaleutu	1998	738,000	33,000
Argentina	Jujuy	2002	130,000	100,000
Argentina	Norte de Neuquen	2005	2,482,000	17,329
Argentina	San Pedro	2007	443,514	966,000
Argentina	Tucuman	2008	180,000	1,336,664
Bolivia	Chiquitano	2005	20,400,000	130,000
Brazil	Mata Atlantica	2004	2,250,320	68,208
Brazil	Pandeiros	2005	210,000	34,811
Chile	Araucarias del Alto Malleco	2002	391,400	10,237
Chile	Chiloe	1996	300,000	33,000
Chile	Panguipulli	2005	329,200	33,273
Chile	Cachapoal	2008	105,000	53,386
Colombia	Risaralda	2008	360,000	883,673
Costa Rica	Reventacion	2003	300,000	432,395
Costa Rica	Chorotega	2011	512,510	156,326
Cuba	Sabanas de Mancaca	2008	171,700	81,620
Dominican Republic	Sabana Yegua	2003	166,000	77,000
Dominican Republic	Yeque del Norte	2007	83,000	908,250
Dominican Republic	Colinas Bajas	2010	909,200	142,624
Ecuador	NA.	NA.	NA.	NA.
Guatemala	Lachua	2008	53,523	18,277
Guatemala	Los Altos	2008	50,000	252,620
Honduras	Atlantida	2006	440,000	315,041
Honduras	Yoro	2007	321,219	132,679
Paraguay	In Progress	2008	NA.	NA.
Peru	In Progress	2011	NA.	NA.
Puerto Rico	Tierras Adjuntas	2007	14,400	44,633
Spain	Urbion	2006	120,000	81,620
Total	29	-	32,260,986	6,286,882

=== Partners ===
RIABM relies on the collaboration of internationally recognized organizations such as the Tropical Agricultural Research and Higher Education Center (CATIE), the Food and Agriculture Organization of the United Nations (FAO) and Cuso International, the Network partners with countries that support the Model Forest approach to sustainable development.

The RIABM is one of the six regional networks of the International Model Forest Network (IMFN) along with the Mediterranean Model Forest Network, the African Model Forest Network, the Regional Model Forest Network - Asia, the Baltic Landscape Initiative (Sweden, Russia and Northern European countries) and the Canadian Model Forest Network. Since the founding of the RIABM in 2002, it has evolved to become one of the largest and most dynamic regional networks within the IMFN. The IMFN is a global community of practice that links over 60 Model Forests in 30 countries across five continents around the world.
