= Canadian arms trade =

Canadian Arms Sales are governed by the country's Export and Imports Permits Act. Sales with the United States are also specifically regulated by the 1959 Defence Production Sharing Arrangement.

As of 2000, the largest Canadian-owned arms-exporters were Canadian Aviation Electronics (a.k.a. CAE), the 61st-largest defence corporation in the world, and Dy4 Systems (a division of Curtiss-Wright), the 94th-largest. Foreign-owned companies based in Canada, such as General Motors and Bell Helicopter also contribute significantly.

== Current policies ==
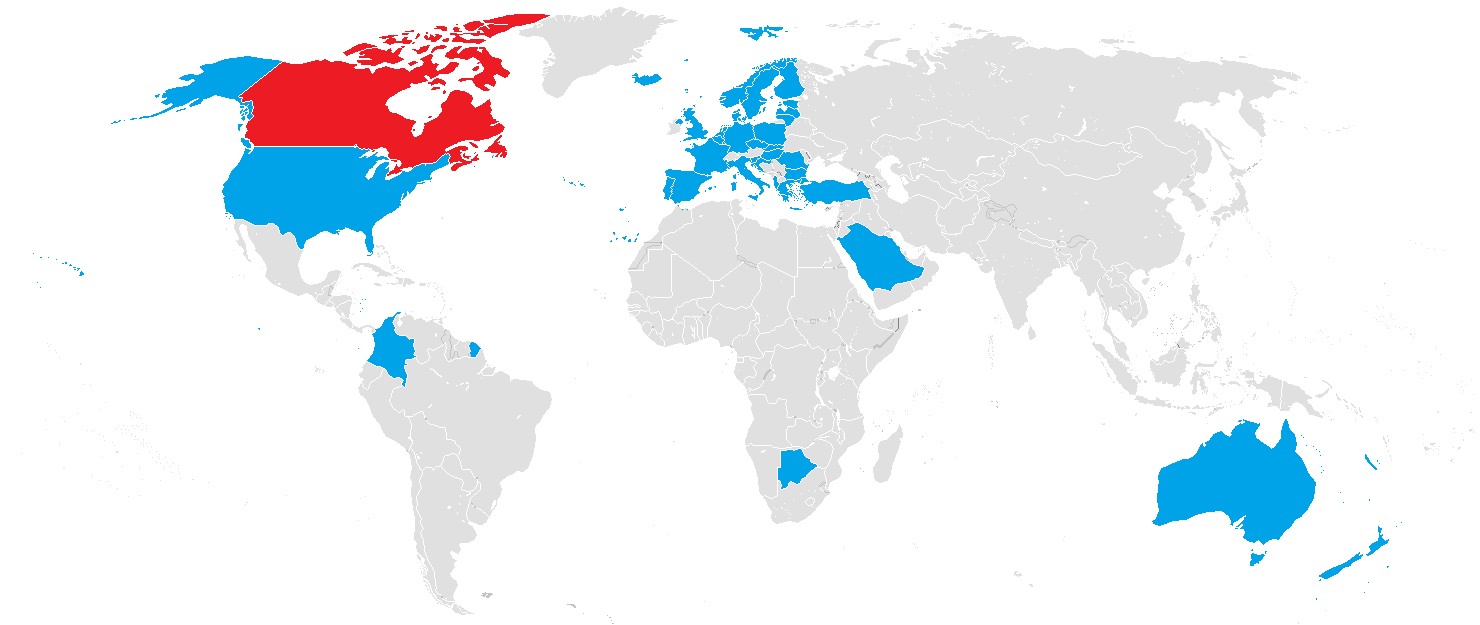
Countries on the Canadian Automatic Firearms Country Control List

=== Automatic Firearms Country Control List (AFCCL) ===
Canadian Government guidance for export controls on weapons systems is published by Foreign Affairs and International Trade Canada. The Automatic Firearms Country Control List, amended January 2015, is a list of approved export nations which include Albania, Australia, Belgium, Botswana, Bulgaria, Chile, Colombia, Croatia, the Czech Republic, Denmark, Estonia, Finland, France, Germany, Greece, Hungary, Iceland, Israel, Italy, Kuwait, Latvia, Lithuania, Luxembourg, the Netherlands, New Zealand, Norway, Peru, Poland, Portugal, Romania, Saudi Arabia, Slovakia, Slovenia, South Korea, Spain, Sweden, Turkey, Ukraine, the United Kingdom, and the United States.

== Current sales ==
=== Saudi Arabia ===
525 MOWAG Piranha armoured personnel carriers (APCs) have been sold by General Dynamics to Saudi Arabia since 1990.

In 2018 CBC obtained records showing that the deal struck in 2014 involved 928 of the most modern LAVs, the General Dynamics Land Systems Canada LAV 6. Of those, 354 are standard troop carriers, 119 of them are "heavy duty" with 105 millimetre cannons affixed to the turret, another 119 are anti tank versions of the LAV 6 and another 119 are "direct fire support" with a two-man turret and a 30 millimetre chain gun.

=== Russian Federation ===
Canada sold about $329,000 worth of equipment to the Russian Federation between 2007 and 2011, mostly in firearms, armored equipment and software technology. However, due to the Annexation of Crimea by the Russian Federation, Canada is seeking to suspend all sales to Moscow as part of its move to implement sanctions in support of Ukraine.

== Cultural Influence ==
The production of arms and munitions in Canada has long had a major impact on the artistic and cultural production of the country. Henrietta Mabel May was hired by the Canadian War Memorials Fund to depict masses of women entering the workplace in her painting Women Making Shells (1919). Likewise, Paraskeva Clark documented women's rigging of parachutes and other key equipment outside of a Trenton, Ontario air base in Parachute Riggers (1947). Both works speak to the gendered legacy of the arms industry, which was initially staffed almost exclusively by women left on the home front during the First and Second World Wars.

In later years, sites of military production became flash points for criticism and protest art. Charles Stankievech's The Soniferous Æther of the Land Beyond the Land Beyond (2012) explores the environmental and social impact of military installations in the arctic circle. Indigenous artist Adrian Stimson participated in the Canadian Forces Artist Program and created Trench, a commemoration of the more than 4,000 indigenous soldiers who served in World War I, while stationed in Kandahar, Afghanistan. Both works explore the social role of the arms trade and larger military industrial complex, in the unique context of Canadian culture.

== Annual reports ==
=== 1986 ===
In 1986, Project Ploughshares organised a protest against the conference HiTech '86 which was hosted by the Canadian government, advertising potential foreign markets to military-based contractors.

=== 1991 ===
In 1991, the Canadian government amended the Exports and Imports Permit Act, to allow more freedom in selling LAVs and automatic weapons. Because it had recently been banned from Ottawa city property, the Arms Exhibition ARMX'91 moved to a new home at the Carp Airport outside the city limits.

=== 1992 ===
In 1992, the Official Opposition Liberal Party introduced a Parliamentary proposal entitled Defence Conversion – A Liberal Priority, which outlined three possibilities for a post-Cold War Canadian arms trade, including "increas[ing] exports to developing countries where arms spending has been less affected by the Cold War's end – thereby adding to the misery of these countries., and instead advocating the third option, to "encourage Canadian defence companies to adjust and move away from a dependence on military production and export.".

=== 1994 ===
In 1994, Canadian arms sales increased 48% to a total of $497.4 million, causing a brief controversy. This sharp escalation contributed to Canada's position as the 7th largest supplier of military arms to Third World countries. Large sales included GM-built Light Armoured Vehicles to the Kingdom of Saudi Arabia, and Air Defense Anti-Tank Systems and a Tactical Air Navigation System to Thailand.

1994 also saw Canada begin selling military arms to Algeria, Colombia, Indonesia and South Africa.

=== 1995 ===
In 1995, Canada became the 7th-largest supplier of arms to third-world countries, and the 10th largest arms dealer overall.

=== 2000 ===
In 2000, Canada's sales totalled $434 million, across 50 nations. Large sales included eight Howitzers to Brazil, and four more LAVs to Saudi Arabia, while smaller sales included $4.9 million worth of rockets to Malaysia, $270,976 in simulator parts to Morocco, $50,000 worth of aircraft parts to Indonesia, $27,000 in small arms to Argentina, $21,400 worth of missile parts to Egypt.

The year also marked the conclusion of the Canadian sale of 40 Huey military helicopters to the United States, who then refitted 33 of the craft with further military upgrades and sold them to Colombia, thus allowing Canada to bypass its restriction against selling arms to Colombia.

=== 2001 ===
From 1991 through 2001, the Filipino Department of National Defense imported an annual average of $1.6 million worth of its equipment from Canada, including aircraft parts and service pistols. This was roughly 0.2% of the $995 million Filipino defense budget of 1998.

=== 2004 ===
Major sales in 2004 included the sale of $346 million worth of Bell Helicopters to Pakistan and $22 million worth of Pratt & Whitney Canada aircraft engines to Indonesia.

=== 2011 ===
Canada jumped from fifteenth to twelfth largest exporter of military hardware in the world.

=== 2012 ===
Canada sold their military equipment to the Philippines in their signed Memorandum of Understanding agreement.

On December 14, 2012, the Government of Canada concluded the regulatory process to amend the AFCCL. This amendment expands the AFCCL to include Colombia, bringing the number of countries on the AFCCL to 34.
