= Sports for Sharing =

Organization

Sports For Sharing
- Founded: 2012
- Founder: Dina Buchbinder Auron
- Type: Non-profit
- Purpose: Fair play, healthy kids, early learning, empathy
- Location: Washington, D.C.

Sports for Sharing is a civic education program that uses sports and games to form better citizens from childhood. Based on the idea of learning through play and the United Nations' Millennium Development Goals, Sports for Sharing aims to teach children empathy, social awareness and how they can be empowered to create positive change in the world. As a Washington, D.C.–based nonprofit, Sports for Sharing currently operates in five D.C. elementary schools.

== Origins ==
Sports for Sharing is the American launch of the Mexico-based Deportes para-Compartir. Founded in 2007 by Dina Buchbinder Auron as the main program of the AMNU, Deportes para-Compartir has expanded successfully to 26 Mexican states and over 114,000 beneficiaries. Derived from the Canadian program, Sport in a Box, founded in 2005 by the United Nations Association in Canada.
