= Muriel Duckworth =

Canadian pacifist, feminist, and social and community activist (1908–2009)

Muriel Duckworth CM ONS
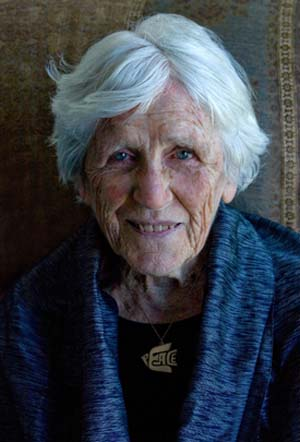
- Portrait commissioned in honour of Duckworth's 100th birthday
- Born: Muriel Helen Ball; October 31, 1908; Austin, Quebec, Canada
- Died: August 22, 2009 (aged 100); Magog, Quebec, Canada
- Education: McGill University; Union Theological Seminary
- Occupation: Social activist
- Years active: 1925–2009
- Political party: Co-operative Commonwealth Federation; New Democratic Party
- Spouse: Jack Duckworth (m. 1929; died 1975)
- Children: 3, including Martin and Eleanor

Muriel Helen Duckworth CM ONS (née Ball; October 31, 1908 – August 22, 2009) was a Canadian pacifist, feminist, and social and community activist. She was a practising Quaker, a religious denomination committed to non-violence. Duckworth maintained that war, with its systematic violence against women and children, is a major obstacle to social justice. She argued that money spent on armaments perpetuates poverty while reinforcing the power of privileged elites. She believed that "war is stupid" and she steadfastly refused to accept popular distinctions between "good" and "bad" wars.

Duckworth was a founding member of the Nova Scotia Voice of Women for Peace, a provincial branch of the national peace organization called the Voice of Women (VOW). From 1967 to 1971, she served as president of VOW leading protests against the Canadian government's quiet support for the US-led war in Vietnam.

Duckworth was the first woman in Halifax to run for a seat in the Nova Scotia legislature. She also led community organizing efforts seeking improvements in education, housing, social assistance and municipal planning. In her later years, Duckworth performed with the Halifax chapter of the Raging Grannies, a group that composes and sings satirical ballads promoting social justice.

Duckworth received many honours and awards including the 1981 Governor General's Award in Commemoration of the Persons Case and the Order of Canada in 1983. In 1991, she received the Pearson Medal of Peace. She was also granted 10 honorary university degrees.

== Childhood influences ==
=== Early life and education ===
Muriel Helena Ball was born on October 31, 1908, on her parents' farm in Austin, Quebec, a village in the Eastern Townships about 130 km east of Montreal. She was one of five children born to Anna Westover and Ezra Ball. Their farm was on the scenic shores of Lake Memphremagog and Muriel spent her first years enjoying the natural beauty around her. She was so deeply affected by the landscape that she returned nearly every summer for the rest of her life to the cottage her aunt and uncle built in 1913.

Although the family farm was suitable for raising livestock such as chickens and cattle, the land was not very fertile. Muriel's mother supplemented the family income by taking in summer boarders, while her father sold lightning rods. Muriel attended a local one-room country school until she was seven, then transferred to a larger school in the town of Magog where she boarded during the week with two siblings and an aunt. In 1917, when she was nine, her father sold the farm and bought a grocery and feed store in Magog. He also sold wood and oil. The next year, her mother opened a tea room and boarding home that catered to summer visitors who came by steamship and rail. As they grew older, Muriel and her two sisters helped their mother with cleaning, cooking, making beds and waiting on tables. Serving the public in the tea room helped Muriel cope with her chronic shyness.

=== Anna Ball as role model ===
Her mother's career as a successful businesswoman and her dedication to community service in the Methodist church and the Woman's Christian Temperance Union had a powerful influence on Muriel. Anna Ball had a boarding house, a block from the train station. She fed hungry men and gave shelter to homeless young women who came to Magog on the trains and raised funds to establish a home for the elderly and started a community lending library. Duckworth was also an admirer of Nellie McClung and Agnes Macphail, two political activists who championed women's rights. Many decades later, Muriel told an interviewer that her mother's example helped lead her into social activism. Her mother cared passionately about what she did, Muriel said. She believed she could have a positive effect and did.

=== Ontario Ladies College ===
After finishing high school which ended at grade 11, Muriel attended the Ontario Ladies College, a Methodist girls' school in Whitby, Ontario. Her aunt, Abbie Ball, taught there and offered to pay Muriel's fees. The college provided instruction in languages, history, mathematics and piano but little science. The 15-year-old Muriel was too shy to participate in drama even though her aunt was the school's drama coach. She also suffered from homesickness. Once a month, guest speakers, usually from the United Church of Canada addressed the student assembly. Muriel especially remembered James Endicott, then a missionary in China, who went on to become a prominent church leader and a lifelong acquaintance.

== University years ==
=== McGill, 1925–1929 ===
Muriel undertook studies at Montreal's McGill University with the help of a small college bursary and money from her Aunt Abbie. She was enrolled in the university's Bachelor of Arts program and in her graduating year, took the education courses required to qualify for a high school teaching diploma. To practise teaching in front of a classroom full of children as well as her fellow education students was especially difficult for her, but Muriel hid her fear so well that the supervising professor praised her apparent lack of nervousness. She also tried to overcome her shyness by entering a public speaking contest and volunteering to take minutes at student meetings.

=== Student Christian Movement ===
Muriel's participation in the Student Christian Movement (SCM) at McGill was a life-changing experience. "Looking back over the years," she told her biographer, "I've felt always that the experience of the SCM was the most important thing that happened to me, probably the most important aspect of my college life, more important than any of the courses that I took." The SCM conducted small study groups in which students were encouraged to discuss their beliefs freely and come to their own conclusions about how to interpret the Gospels. For Muriel, such discussions were unsettling and painful, yet also exciting. "I had always before treated the Gospel as though its authors had set down day by day events in the life of Jesus as they happened," she said. "To face the implication that nothing was written down until after Jesus died was itself a shock. But this question of free and open discussion, that everything needed to be challenged, to be questioned, to be talked about, that was completely opposite to the authoritarian approach in the church." The SCM study groups fostered independent thinking. "This was the beginning of my adult search for truth," Muriel told her biographer, "and my sense that all things must be open to me."

=== Graduation and marriage ===
In 1926, Muriel met Jack Duckworth, a McGill student who was also active in the SCM. She was 18, he was 29. Duckworth was attending university to qualify for a job with the YMCA where he had been a volunteer working with boys in Vancouver. To finance his studies, he became a student minister and discovered his talents as a preacher. He decided to continue studying theology after earning his MA degree from McGill. In 1928, Muriel and Duckworth were engaged to be married. In the fall, he began two years of studies at the Union Theological Seminary in the City of New York (UTS). Muriel graduated from McGill in May 1929 and a month later the Duckworths were married at an informal wedding in Montreal. They began their married life in New York where Duckworth was completing his final year at UTS.

=== Union Theological Seminary ===
While there is a lower class, I am in it
While there is a criminal element, I am of it
And while there is a soul in prison, I am not free.

— Eugene Debs. From a poster that hung on Muriel Duckworth's wall 60 years after she attended UTS.

Muriel Duckworth enrolled as a full-time student at Union Theological Seminary in 1929. She was also registered as a part-time UTS field student and worked with poor teenage girls at a community church in Hell's Kitchen on New York's West Side. Duckworth met these 16- and 17-year-old working-class girls twice a week in a recreation group and in a Sunday School class. She also visited their homes gaining first-hand knowledge of the conditions experienced by working-class immigrants who lived in cramped, windowless flats beside "booming and clattering" elevated trains. In her academic studies, Duckworth learned about the Social Gospel movement which strove to improve people's lives through social services and adult education at a time when the Great Depression was just beginning. Her teachers at UTS included Harry Ward, a Christian socialist who campaigned for civil and political rights and the noted theologian Reinhold Niebuhr. "The Social Gospel and pacifism were linked in my mind," Duckworth said adding that she remembered hearing about Eugene V. Debs "a labour hero who had gone to prison for opposition to the First World War and who ran for president of the U.S. while he was in jail."

=== Family life ===
Muriel and Jack Duckworth returned to Montreal in 1930 where they began raising a family. Their son Martin was born in 1933; Eleanor, named after Eleanor Roosevelt, was born in 1935 followed by John in 1938. The family moved to Halifax, Nova Scotia, in 1947 where Jack Duckworth served as general secretary of the YMCA, while Muriel worked in adult education. From 1948 until 1962, Muriel was a part-time parent education adviser for the Nova Scotia Department of Education. Jack Duckworth died, age 76, in May 1975 when Muriel was 66.

== Subsequent activities ==
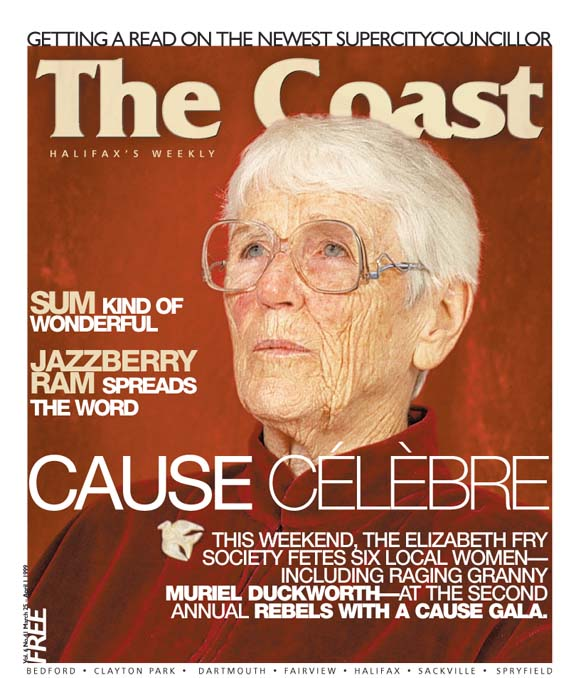
Newspaper cover story on Muriel Duckworth being honoured in 1999 by the Elizabeth Fry Society

Muriel Duckworth's pacifism was reflected in her religious beliefs and her work on behalf of peace organizations. She was a founding member of the Nova Scotia Voice of Women, a provincial branch of the Voice of Women (VOW). She served as the National President of VOW, now called the Canadian Voice of Women for Peace, from 1967 to 1971. During her presidency, VOW protested vigorously against the US-led War in Vietnam. It also condemned the Canadian government's tacit support for the war and its policy of quietly encouraging the sale of Canadian-made weapons to the US military. In 1969 and 1971, Duckworth helped organize two highly publicized visits to Canada by Vietnamese women directly affected by the war.

Duckworth was also active in community organizing, electoral politics and the advancement of women's issues. In 1971, she helped establish the Movement for Citizens' Voice and Action (MOVE), a coalition of community groups in Halifax, Nova Scotia working for a wide range of goals including improvements in education, housing, social assistance and municipal planning. Duckworth became the first woman in Halifax to run for a seat in the Nova Scotia Legislature when she campaigned as a New Democratic Party candidate during the provincial elections of 1974 and 1978. In 1976, she became a founding member of the Canadian Research Institute for the Advancement of Women (CRIAW), an organization set up to sponsor the dissemination of research on issues affecting women. She served as president of CRIAW in 1979–80. Later, she played a leading role in organizing a five-day Women's International Peace Conference held in Halifax in June 1985.

Duckworth was the recipient of numerous honours including the 1981 Governor General's Award in Commemoration of the Persons Case and the Order of Canada in 1983. In 1991, she received the Pearson Medal of Peace. She was also granted 10 honorary degrees including one from Mount Saint Vincent University in 1978 and another from Dalhousie University in 1987. In celebration of her 100th birthday, Oxfam Canada established the Jack and Muriel Duckworth Fund for Active Global Citizenship in recognition of Duckworth's and her late husband's leadership in working for social justice. Duckworth was awarded a posthumous Order of Nova Scotia on September 2, 2009.

== Death and legacy ==
Duckworth fell and broke her leg in August 2009 while at her Quebec cottage. She was treated in hospital in Magog, Quebec, where her condition deteriorated. As she received palliative care, Duckworth reportedly told visitors, "I'm going to leave you now. It's time for me to go. Everything is ready." Then she added: "Be happy with each other. You have each other. Goodbye, I'm going now." Her imminent death drew this comment from her friend, the well-known scholar and peace activist Ursula Franklin: "I would like her to be remembered as somebody who demonstrated that it's possible to change one's society, to be profoundly critical and still remain a respected member of that society." Muriel Duckworth died on August 22, 2009, aged 100. Her biographer, Marion Douglas Kerans said, "She showed women how to become true leaders in their community, and in the world, without losing any feminine grace."

== See also ==
- List of peace activists
