= Project Ploughshares =

Canadian Nonprofit organization

- Founded: 1976
- Founder: Ernie Regehr and Murray Thomson
- Type: Nonprofit organization
- Headquarters: Conrad Grebel University College
- Location: Waterloo, Ontario
- Director: Paul Heidebrecht
- Publication: Ploughshares Monitor
- Website: https://ploughshares.ca/

Project Ploughshares is a Canadian non-government organization which works to advance policies and actions to prevent war and armed violence and build peace located in the Centre for Peace Advancement at Conrad Grebel University College in Waterloo, Ontario.

== History and leadership ==
Ploughshares was founded in 1976 by Ernie Regehr and Murray Thomson to promote peace by drawing attention to the increasing development and flow of weapons. The organization was located at Conrad Grebel College in Waterloo, Ontario, Canada. In mid-1977 it became a project of the Canadian Council of Churches. Project Ploughshares is also affiliated with the Institute of Peace and Conflict Studies at Conrad Grebel University College.

Project Ploughshares takes its name from Isaiah 2:4 where it is written "God shall judge between the nations, and shall decide for many peoples; and they shall beat their swords into ploughshares, and spears into pruning hooks; nation shall not lift up sword against nation; neither shall they learn war any more."

Since being co-founded by Ernie Regehr in 1976, the organization has been led by John Siebert (2005 to 2015), Cesar Jaramillo (2015 to 2025, and Paul Heidebrecht from 2026.

== Activities ==
Since April 1977, Project Ploughshares has published the quarterly Ploughshares Monitor journal. The organization operates programs focussed on the arms trade, nuclear weapons, emerging technology and artificial intelligence, climate and security, and space security.

=== Arms Trade ===
Project Ploughshares monitors and reports on the Canadians arms trade. The organization maintains the Canadian Military Industry Database which compiles publicly available records of military contracts awarded to Canadian companies as well as annual government records of arms exports to overseas countries.

Project Ploughshares is a member organization of the International Action Network on Small Arms, and the Control Arms coalition.

=== Nuclear Weapons ===
Project Ploughshares advocates to governments to advance nuclear disarmament. In the 1980's the organization supported two million Canadians to send postcards to their MPs, advocating against the modernization of nuclear Canada's nuclear arsenal.

=== Space Security ===
In 2003, launched the Space Security Index. The index is research partnership between academic, governmental, and non-governmental organizations, including the Institute of Air and Space Law at McGill University, the Secure World Foundation, Project Ploughshares, and The Simons Foundation.

In cooperation with Global Affairs Canada's International Security Research and Outreach Programme (ISROP), the program publishes an annual report called the Space Security Index, reporting on trends and developments in space security based. The objective is to facilitate dialogue on space security challenges and potential responses by providing the necessary facts and focus to inform an important debate that has become unnecessarily polarized. The project produces an annual report on trends and developments in space.
