= Eleanor Duckworth =

American psychologist and editor (born 1935)

Eleanor Ruth Duckworth
- Born: 1935 (age 90–91); Montreal, Quebec, Canada

Philosophical work
- Region: Western Philosophy
- School: Constructivism
- Main interests: Cognitive development, science education, curriculum, teacher education
- Notable ideas: Cognitive development, educational progressivism

Eleanor Ruth Duckworth (born 1935) is a teacher, teacher educator, and psychologist.

Duckworth earned her Ph.D. at the Université de Genève in 1977. She grounds her work in Jean Piaget and Bärbel Inhelder's insights into the nature and development of understanding and intelligence and in their clinical interview method. She was also an elementary school teacher. Her participation in the 1960s curriculum development projects Elementary Science Study and African Primary Science Program was germinal for her insights and practices in exploratory methods in teaching and learning.

== Early life ==
Duckworth is the daughter of Jack and Muriel Duckworth, Canadian peace workers and social and community activists. Jack Duckworth, born in 1897, was a highly regarded leader in the national YMCA movement and an outspoken pacifist from the 1930s until his death in 1975. Muriel Duckworth was one of the 1000 women worldwide nominated for the Nobel Peace Prize in 2005.

She is the sister of Montreal filmmaker Martin Duckworth and Nova Scotia businessman and musician John Duckworth.

== The developmentalist tradition ==
Within teacher education in the United States in the twentieth century, Duckworth's contributions relate to a progressive or developmentalist approach. The idea of a teacher acting as a researcher is embraced by four traditions of reflective teaching practice: academic, social efficiency, developmentalist and social reconstructivist. The developmentalist tradition considers that the teacher is both a practitioner and a researcher. (Zeichner, 1992, p. 165).

Duckworth (2006, p. xiii) wrote in her book The Having of Wonderful Ideas that she built her developmental approach on two foundations very powerful to her.

1. The work of Jean Piaget and Bärbel Inhelder. Two aspects in the work of Piaget and Inhelder were especially important for Duckworth (2005b, pp. 258–259): first the basic idea of assimilation, that is, every person creates meaning on her own, while taking any experience into her own schemes, structures, previous understanding; and second the clinical interviewing or clinical method, that is, engaging children in talking about their ideas with a researcher.
2. Her experience with the Elementary Science Study (ESS) curriculum development program. This program is consistent with the work of Piaget and Inhelder in psychology, and it is considered to be a milestone in the history of science education. The Elementary Science Study tackled the following main question: "So how do we present material 'from without' so that the activity that 'the mind itself undergoes' is valuable?" (Duckworth, 2005a, p. 142)

The central question of Duckworth's (2006: xiv) research over five decades continues to be: "How do people learn and what can anyone do to help?" In the process of investigating this question, she has developed a research method which she has called expanded clinical interviewing, teaching/learning research and critical exploration. These three phrases emerged in the course of her research and are used interchangeably (Duckworth, 2006, p. xv).

== Critical Exploration ==
Duckworth (2005b, pp. 258–259) describes critical exploration as having two facets: curriculum development and pedagogy. In the context of critical exploration, curriculum development means that the teacher is planning how to engage students' minds in exploring the subject matter. Pedagogy constitutes the practice by which teachers invite students to express their thoughts.

Critical exploration as a research method requires just as much resourcefulness in finding appropriate materials, questions, and activities as any good curriculum development does. Whether it be poems, mathematical situations, historical documents, liquids, or music, our offerings must provide some accessible entry points, must present the subject matter from different angles, elicit different responses from different learners, open a variety of paths for exploration, engender conflicts, and provide surprises; we must encourage learners to open out beyond themselves, and help them realize that here are other points of view yet to be uncovered – that they have not yet exhausted the thoughts they might have about this matter.

— (Duckworth, 2006, p. 140).

During critical exploration, exploring goes on in two modes: in one mode the child explores the subject matter, and in the other mode the researcher-teacher explores the child's thinking. Hence, for the teacher, critical exploration finds itself at the nexus of research and teaching where teacher and learner support each other (Shorr, 2007, pp. 369–370).

Critical exploration, then, as a research method, has two aspects: 1) developing a good project for the child to work on; and 2) succeeding in inviting the child to talk about her ideas: putting her at ease, being receptive to all answers; being neutral to the substance of the answer while being encouraging about the fact that the child is thinking and talking; getting the child to keep thinking about the problem, beyond the first thought that comes to her; getting her to take her thinking seriously.

— (Duckworth, 2005b, p. 259)

Consequently, Duckworth (2008b) suggests that a classroom teacher can take on the role of a researcher. The teacher explores too, by interacting with students' learning. It is the teacher's work to present engaging problems and attend to students' ways of figuring them out, helping them to notice what's interesting. For example, the teacher listens to students explain their ideas and asks them questions that seek to take students' thinking further (Duckworth, 2006, pp. 173–174).

=== The main ideas of the teaching/learning research ===
Outlining her approach, Duckworth (2006, p. 173) states: "As a student of Piaget, I was convinced that people must construct their own knowledge and must assimilate new experiences in ways that make sense to them. I knew that, more often than not, simply telling students what we want them to know leaves them cold". Considering learning and teaching, critical exploration stresses the following aspects.

- Students bring their prior expectations, interests and knowledge to the learning experience. (Duckworth, 2006, p. 12).
- Students need something complex that challenges them to explore. (Duckworth, 2002).
- Teacher acts as facilitator with a researcher mind-set.

=== Teacher education ===
If teachers are to teach their students exploratively, they must have experienced learning as explorers themselves (Duckworth, 2006). In the teacher education work that Duckworth does at Harvard University and elsewhere, she provides teachers with the opportunity to live through and think about the phenomena of teaching and learning. She involves teacher education students in the effort to understand somebody else's understanding. She considers it important for teachers to know what their students are understanding, that is: what sense the students are making of the subject matter (Duckworth in Meek, 1991, p. 32).

In her courses at Harvard University she applies her teaching approach by using critical exploration to teach critical exploration. Her famous T-440 course titled Teaching and Learning: "The Having of Wonderful Ideas" is usually conducted with two parallel groups, each having up to 50 teacher education students. Duckworth states on her course website: "The course starts from the premise that there are endless numbers of adequate pathways for people to come to understand subject matters. Curriculum and assessment must build on this diversity. A second premise is that every person can get involved with and enjoy and get good at every subject matter."

In her university teaching Duckworth (2006, pp. 9, 173–192) tries to engage teacher education students with three major kinds of teaching and learning phenomena:

1. Films and/or (life) demonstrations with one or two children or adolescents. In this way teacher education students can observe children/adults learning while instructors are teaching by engaging those learners and by listening and understanding the explanations of those learners;
2. Teacher education students carry out a similar inquiry outside of classtime, where they meet with one or two people who are their practice learners. In this way, each teacher education student creates, on his own, a trial critical exploration for learners and then reflects on it in writing;
3. Teacher education students learn as a group about a particular subject other than teaching and learning. Through this exploratory study by the group, the teacher education students are learning in the same way that the children in their classes will be learning. This subject could be from any area of study such as: pendulums, mathematical permutations, history, arts and poems.

== Awards (selected) ==
- Inaugural Barbara K. Lipman Award for Advances in Early Childhood Education given annually to a researcher, writer or program designer who has significantly influenced early childhood education or child growth and development, University of Memphis (2008).
- The book "The having of wonderful ideas" and other essays on teaching and learning won the American Educational Association Award for writing on teaching and teacher education (1987).
- Inaugural Catherine Molony Memorial Lecture at City College School of Education, Workshop Center for Open Education (1979).

== Bibliography (selection) ==
- Duckworth, E.R. (1964a). "Piaget rediscovered". Journal of Research in Science Teaching. 2 (3): 172–175. Bibcode:1964JRScT...2..172D. doi:10.1002/tea.3660020305.
- Duckworth, E.R. (1964b). "Floating color tubes". Nature and Children. 1 (2): 6–7.
- Duckworth, E.R. (1973a). Language and Thought. In M. Schwebel & J. Raph (eds), Piaget in the classroom (pp. 132–154). New York: Basic Books.
- Duckworth, E.R. (1973b). The having of wonderful ideas. In M. Schwebel & J. Raph (Eds.), Piaget in the classroom (pp. 258–277). New York: Basic Books.
- Duckworth, E.R. (1973c). Piaget takes a teacher's look. An interview with Jean Piaget. Learning: The magazine for Creative Teaching, 22–27.
- Duckworth, E.R. (1978). The African primary science program: An evaluation and extended thoughts. Grand Forks: North Dakota Study Group on Evaluation.
- Duckworth, E.R. (1979). "An introductory note about Piaget". Journal of Education. 161: 5–12. doi:10.1177/002205747916100103. S2CID 186385982.
- Duckworth, E.R. (1983). "Teachers as learners". Archives de Psychologie. 51: 171–175.
- Duckworth, E.R. (1987). "Some depths and perplexities of elementary arithmetic". Journal of Mathematical Behavior. 6: 43–94.
- Duckworth, E.R. (1990). Opening the world. In E. Duckworth, J. Easley, D. Hawkins & A. Henriques (Eds.), Science education: A minds-on approach for the elementary years (pp. 21–59). Hillsdale, NJ: Erlbaum.
- Duckworth, E.R. (1999). "Engaging learners with their own ideas: An interview with Eleanor Duckworth". The Active Learner. 4 (1): 28–30.
- Duckworth, E.R. (2001a). Inventing density. In E. Duckworth (ed.), "Tell me more": Listening to learners explain (pp. 1–41). New York: Teachers College Press. Original publication 1986.
- Duckworth, E.R. (eds.) (2001b). "Tell me more": Listening to learners explain. New York: Teachers College Press. Booknote retrieved, April 12, 2009, at http://www.hepg.org/her/booknote/79 Book review retrieved, April 12, 2009, at https://www.nicholasmeier.com/Articles/2005-04_duckworth.htm
- Duckworth, E.R. (2002). "The having of wonderful ideas" and other essays on teaching and learning. Fieldwork - Notes from expeditionary learning classrooms, X(2), 11–12. Book review
- Duckworth, E.R. (2005a). A reality to which each belongs. In B.S. Engel (ed.), Holding values: What we mean by progressive education (pp. 142–147). Portsmouth, NH: Heinemann.
- Duckworth, E.R. (2005b). "Critical exploration in the classroom". New Educator. 1 (4): 257–272. doi:10.1080/15476880500276728. S2CID 143485553.
- Duckworth, E.R. (2006). "The having of wonderful ideas" and other essays on teaching and learning. Third edition. New York: Teachers College Press.
- Duckworth, E.R. (2008). Teaching as research. In A. Miletta & M. Miletta (eds), Classroom conversations. A collection of classics for parents and teachers (pp. 119–144). New York: The New Press.
- Duckworth, E.R. & Fusaro, M. (2008b). Critical exploration in the classroom. Harvard Graduate School of Education - Usable Knowledge.
- Duckworth, E.R. (2009). "Helping students get to where ideas can find them" (PDF). The New Educator. 5 (3): 185–188. doi:10.1080/1547688X.2009.10399573. S2CID 145100002.
- Duckworth, E.R. and the Experienced Teachers Group (1997). Teacher to teacher: Learning from each other. New York: Teachers College Press. Book review retrieved, April 12, 2009, at https://web.archive.org/web/20081006191210/http://edrev.asu.edu/reviews/rev42.htm
- Duckworth, E.R. (2010). "The Soul Purpose". Learning Landscapes, 3 (2): 21–28.
- Duckworth, E.R. & Julyan, C. (2005). A constructivist perspective on teaching and learning science. In C.T. Fosnot (Ed.), Constructivism: Theory, perspectives, and practice (pp. 61–79). 2nd edition. New York: Teachers College Press.
- Duckworth, E.R., Easley, J., Hawkins, D. & Henriques, A. (Eds.) (1990). Science education: A minds-on approach for the elementary years. Hillsdale, NJ: Erlbaum.
