= Hanna Newcombe =

Canadian academic (1922–2011)

Hanna Newcombe (February 5, 1922 – April 10, 2011) was the co-founder of Peace Research Abstracts and Peace Research Reviews, was the recipient of the 1997 Pearson Medal of Peace and was elected a member of the Order of Canada in 2007 for her work in peace research and international relations.

== Early life ==
Newcombe was born Hanna Hammerschlag in Prague, Czechoslovakia. She was the only surviving child of Arthur and Paula Hammerschlag (née Seger); an older brother, Georg, was killed in a tragic kitchen accident when he was a toddler. Her childhood and early adolescence were in Prague. When she was 17, the Nazis marched into Prague, prompting her Jewish parents to emigrate with her to Canada in 1939. Her father was able to obtain a visa through contacts made in the course of his business as an importer of grain. As a Canadian requirement of their immigration, the family managed a fruit farm near Grimsby, Ontario, for several years, moving to Toronto after the Second World War. Newcombe earned a BSc from McMaster University in 1945. She met her husband Alan George Newcombe at McMaster, and they then both went on to earn doctorates in chemistry from the University of Toronto.

== Career ==
After receiving her PhD in 1950, Newcombe never worked full-time as a chemist, due in large part to the fact that, at that time, married women with children were not expected to work. Daughter Nora was born in 1951 and son George in 1953, both in Toronto, where Alan was working at the Ontario Research Foundation. In 1955, the Newcombes moved to Hamilton, Ontario, where Alan took a job as Director of Research and Development for Porritts & Spencer, a manufacturer of felts for paper making. Son Ian was born in 1956. While raising her three children, Newcombe worked occasionally as an instructor in chemistry. She also took advantage of her knowledge of several languages, including Czech, German and English, to translate scientific articles. In 1962, she briefly tried teaching high school chemistry, but was dismayed by her students' lack of interest in her subject.

After meeting Norman Alcock, a physicist who had founded the Canadian Peace Research Institute, Newcombe realized that she had found her calling: the use of science to better understand the path to peace. Alan joined her in working for CPRI shortly thereafter. The Newcombes founded the Peace Research Institute in Dundas, Ontario in the late 1970s. The Canadian Peace Research and Education Association was also their initiative. They founded and published for many years two scholarly journals: Peace Research Abstracts and Peace Research Reviews. They also organized summer institutes on peace research at Grindstone Island, located in the Rideau Lakes, which was a center for peace education managed by the Canadian Friends Service Committee. Hanna was prominent for many decades in the World Federalist Movement, the Canadian Voice of Women, and the Canadian Religious Society of Friends (Quakers). She was also an advocate of mundialization and of twinning. Her writing ranged over many topics, including ruminations on philosophy, religion and the history of science.

== Death ==
Hanna Newcombe died in Hamilton in the early morning of April 10, 2011, after a short illness, with her son Ian at her bedside. She was very proud of her three children and of her seven grandchildren: Felice, Claire, Talia, Paul, Andrew, Connor and Eric. Before she died, she knew that she had a great-grandchild on the way, and was thrilled to know that Felice's son (Mason, born in August 2011) would continue the great chain of being. Family and friends have endowed the Newcombe Prize in Peace Studies at McMaster University, which is given annually to an outstanding undergraduate in Peace Studies. McMaster is also the home of an electronic record of her writing available at *"
