= Canadian Commercial Corporation =

Canadian crown corporation

Agency overview
- Formed: 1946
- Jurisdiction: Government of Canada
- Headquarters: Ottawa
- Minister responsible: Maninder Sidhu, Minister of International Trade
- Agency executive: Robert Kwon, President and Chief Executive Officer
- Website: www.ccc.ca

The Canadian Commercial Corporation (CCC; French: Corporation commerciale canadienne) is a Canadian federal Crown corporation mandated to support the growth of international trade by helping Canadian exporters gain access to foreign government procurement markets and by helping government buyers abroad to obtain goods from Canada. The ability to enter into commercial contracts as a Government of Canada entity through CCC is designed to give Canadian exporters the opportunity to mitigate risks associated with foreign procurement and international contracting. Canadian businesses exported $2.92 billion in products and services through CCC contracts during the CCC's 2020-2021 fiscal year.

The corporation was established in 1946 by an Act of the Parliament of Canada, the Canadian Commercial Corporation Act, and is accountable to the Parliament of Canada through the Minister of International Trade, Export Promotion, Small Business and Economic Development.

The Act outlines CCC's broad mandate, which is to assist in the development of trade by helping Canadian exporters to access markets abroad and by helping foreign buyers obtain goods from Canada. The legislation also provides the corporation with a range of powers, including the ability to export goods from Canada either as principal or as agent in such a manner and to such an extent as it deems appropriate. As a result, CCC negotiates and executes bilateral government to government (or intergovernmental) procurement arrangements, facilitating export transactions on behalf of Canadian exporters.

As Canada's international contracting agency, CCC is mandated to support Canadian business targeting public sector procurement markets as a prime contractor for government to government (G2G) contracts or as a procurement agent for foreign governments importing Canadian goods and services.

CCC's core business is delivered under the 1956 Canada-U.S. Defence Production Sharing Agreement (DPSA), which governs procurement of Canadian products and services by the U.S. Department of Defense (U.S. DoD). CCC administers U.S. defence purchases above US$250,000 and has a similar agreement with NASA. These agreements provide special access for Canadian companies to U.S. aerospace and defence markets. Under the DPSA, Canadian exporters are generally treated the same as domestic suppliers by the U.S. DoD including under the Buy America provisions.

CCC also works with Canadian exporters to pursue international opportunities where G2G contracting is considered by both Canada and the buying government as a mechanism to advance mutual economic interests and bilateral relationships. CCC's guarantee of contract performance is designed to add incentive for foreign governments to access Canadian expertise for priority projects. The Corporation negotiates deals and manages contracts in a broad range of sectors, including defence electronics, environmental technologies, capital infrastructure projects, information and communications technology, transportation equipment, electrical power equipment. These services are available to small and medium-sized Canadian exporters in addition to foreign government buyers.

== History ==
=== Origins ===
During the Second World War, 28 Crown corporations were created partially in response to the demand for supplies at a level required for the war effort which was beyond the capacity available from the private sector. These Crown corporations were managed by the Department of Munitions and Supply, the successor of the short-lived War Supply Board. As Canada transitioned into peacetime, the creation of Crown corporations was one tactic used to stabilize production of essential commodities while the labour force adjusted to the post-war environment. While the wartime Crown corporations were largely terminated, the agencies in areas of government interest such as weapons production and housing were retained.

In December 1945, the Department of Munitions and Supply was merged with the Department of Reconstruction to become the new Department of Reconstruction and Supply. The CCC was established in 1946 to coordinate the sales and export of Canadian defence products to foreign governments. The responsibility for defence procurement and production was assumed by the new department. By 1948, the Canadian federal government decentralized and separated out the responsibilities for defence procurement and production on account of the reduction in defence spending during peacetime. Production responsibility was transferred to the Industrial Defence Board in April 1948, while procurement responsibility was transferred to the CCC between November and December 1948. By March 1949, both the Industrial Defence Board and CCC were under the authority of the Department of Trade and Commerce.

=== Rearmament in the 1950s ===
The increasing tension from the Cold War, the creation of the North Atlantic Treaty Organization (NATO), and the outbreak of the Korean War led to the Canadian federal government needing to increase defence budgets and to begin increasing defence production. The Defense Supplies Act in 1950 gave the Department of Trade and Commerce the authority to carry out defence procurement activities but was replaced in 1951 in response to the escalation of the Korean War and continuing friction with the Soviet Union. The Defence Production Act reorganized defence procurement and defence production into a single centralized Department of Defence Production (DDP). The DDP did not take over the responsibility for the export of Canadian defence products from CCC, instead it replaced the Department of Trade and Commerce in an oversight capacity. In addition to CCC, seven other Crown corporations reported to Parliament through the DDP: Canadian Arsenals Limited; Crown Assets Disposal Corporation; Defence Construction (1951) Limited; Eldorado Mining and Refining Limited; Northern Transportation Company Limited; and Polymer Corporation Limited.

=== Foreign aid and aerospace focus in the 1960s and 1970s ===
Post-war focus in the 1960s saw CCC focus on delivering in-kind foreign aid in response to natural disasters and famine around the world. In 1960, at the request of Canada's Department of External Affairs, CCC purchased 9,800 tons of flour for earthquake relief in Chile and another 28,300 tons for Lebanon and Egypt following unrest in those countries. CCC also sent tens of thousands of tons of flour to Norway and the United Kingdom as part of a NATO collaboration.

Also in 1960, CCC signed a Letter of Agreement (LOA) with NASA which set out the terms and conditions for CCC to act as prime contractor for material and technologies from Canada. Some of Canada's first contributions were for a "Minitrack" Satellite Tracking Station as well as the design and fabrication of a prototype erectable antenna unit.

Later in the 1960s, CCC managed orders for both tactical and fighter aircraft to the U.S., and tactical ground support aircraft to the Netherlands.

In 1979, the CCC-NASA LOA laid the groundwork for the Shuttle Remote Manipulator System (SRMS) (now commonly known as the Canadarm) to be contracted through CCC by Spar Aerospace Limited of Toronto. For 30 years, NASA's Space Shuttle program used the remote-controlled mechanical arm to deploy, capture and repair satellites, position astronauts, maintain equipment, and move cargo.

During the period from the 1960s and 1970s, responsibility for CCC was transferred to the Department of Supply and Services in 1969 and subsequently to the Department of Industry, Trade and Commerce in 1978.

=== Contracting with established and emerging economies: 1980s-present ===
CCC has facilitated a number of contracts between Canadian exporters and foreign governments since the 1980s. In addition to its focus on U.S. defence contracting, CCC has brokered government to government contracts with emerging economies. In 1982, CCC won contracts with the World Health Organization to spray rivers in Africa to help control disease, with UNICEF for a measles vaccine plant in Pakistan, and with the Foundation Company of Canada to build a hospital in the Ivory Coast. From the 1980s to present day, CCC has facilitated government to government contracts and signed memorandums of understanding with a number of emerging economies around the world.

In 2017, the government of Bermuda entered into a contract with CCC on behalf of the Canadian Government and Canada's Aecon. The Public Private Partnership included the construction of a new airport terminal building and a 30-year lease at the L.F. Wade International Airport. The 288,000 square foot was officially completed in 2020.

In March 2021, the Kpone Unity Terminal was handed over to the Ghana Ports and Harbours Authority upon completion of a five-year project funded through a US$126 million loan procured from the Canadian Commercial Corporation. The Kpone Unity terminal was originally designed to serve as an off-dock terminal for devanning activities from the Port of Tema.

In October 2022, CCC worked with General Dynamics Mission Systems–Canada to secure a $24 million government to government contract with the Portuguese Air Force to help modernize its fleet of P-3C aircraft. That same month, it was revealed that the Philippines would be the first market to implement Canada's government to government CANbuild infrastructure framework—a consolidated exporter service offered by CCC, Canada's Trade Commissioner Service and Export Development Canada.

Responsibility for CCC has been transferred several times in the last few decades, including the Secretary of State for External Affairs (1982), the Minister of International Trade (1987), the Minister of Supply and Services (1992), and back to the Minister of International Trade (1996). Since the 2019 federal election, Canada's international trade portfolio, including responsibility for CCC, is now overseen by the Minister of Small Business, Export Promotion and International Trade.

== Purpose ==
The purposes of the CCC as set out in the Canadian Commercial Corporation Act are:

(a) to assist in the development of trade between Canada and other nations;

(b) to assist persons in Canada

(i) to obtain goods and commodities from outside Canada, and
(ii) to dispose of goods and commodities that are available for export from Canada;

(c) to exercise or perform, on behalf and under the direction of the Minister, any powers or functions vested in the Minister by any other Act that authorizes the Minister to employ the Corporation to exercise or perform them; and,

(d) to exercise or perform any other powers or functions conferred on it by any other Act or for the exercise or performance of which it may be employed under any other Act.

== Operations ==
=== Business Lines ===
CCC delivers its government-to-government contracting services through two core lines of business:

(1) International Prime Contractor; and

(2) U.S. DoD Prime Contractor which includes the administration of the Defence Production Sharing Agreement (DPSA)

In addition to its core business line operations, CCC performs activities related to sourcing and other Government of Canada priorities which include the maintenance and administration of the trade development offices in China on behalf of Global Affairs Canada, sourcing transactions with Government of Canada departments and agencies and a shared services arrangement with another crown corporation which generate economies of scale in providing delivery of in-kind foreign aid.

=== Services ===
CCC's International and U.S. Department of Defense (DoD) prime contractor services facilitate government to government contracts and are designed to provide Canadian companies with greater access to international public sector contract opportunities. As prime contractor, CCC helps pair Canadian companies with international government buyers, aids in contract negotiation and logistics, and provides Government of Canada endorsements and guarantees.

CCC is the Government of Canada's executing agency for the DPSA and is embedded in the U.S. DoD's Defense Federal Acquisition Regulation Supplement (DFARS) to act as the prime contractor for all contracts over US$250,000 awarded to Canadian companies. Additional services under the U.S. DoD prime contractor program include interpretation of bid documents, price review and certification, advocacy and dispute resolution, and protection from payment risk.

CCC administers the Global Bid Opportunity Finder—an online tool funded by the Government of Canada that enables Canadian businesses to search for commercial opportunities with foreign governments in over 200 jurisdictions.

CCC also partners with Canadian government departments and agencies to help them deliver in-kind foreign aid to governments around the world. For example, in October 2022, CCC sourced 400,000 pieces of winter clothing from Canadian companies totaling $15 million CAD, as part of a military aid package for Ukraine.

== Corporate Governance ==
CCC's corporate best practices and corporate social responsibilities are outlined in the Canadian Commercial Corporation Act and the Code of Conduct and Business Ethics.

=== Board of directors ===
CCC is governed by a Board of Directors that exercises its responsibilities in keeping with the general provisions of the CCC Act and Part X of the Financial Administration Act. The board of directors is accountable for the affairs of CCC and ensures the proper delivery of public policy on behalf of the Government of Canada. The board of directors is appointed by the Government of Canada and represent the Canadian business community and the federal government.

- Robert Kwon (President & CEO)
- Dyanne Carenza
- Guy Desrochers
- Mark Deniesch
- Douglas Harrison
- Michael Johnson
- Mora Johnson
- Julian J. Ovens
- Mylène Tassy
- Nicole Verkindt
- Christa Wessel
