= Gisèle Côté-Harper =

Canadian lawyer and academic

- Born: 1942 (age 83–84)

Academic background
- Education: Université Laval (BA, LLM); Harvard University (LLM)

Academic work
- Discipline: Law
- Sub-discipline: International law Human rights law Criminal law
- Institutions: Université Laval

Gisèle Côté-Harper, OC QC (born 1942) is a Canadian lawyer and professor. She is the 1995 recipient of the Pearson Medal of Peace for her work as a human rights activist. She is the first Francophone woman to receive such an honour.

== Education ==
She graduated from Université Laval (B.A. and LL.L.) and Harvard Law School (LL.M.).

== Career ==
Côté-Harper was appointed Queen's Counsel in 1987.

She joined Faculté de droit de l'Université Laval as an assistant professor in 1970 where she specialized in criminal law and human rights. She was promoted to full professor in 1982, and later received the title of emeritus.

In 1997, she was made an officer of the Order of Canada. Côté-Harper also served as board chair of the International Centre for Human Rights and Democratic Development.

== Awards and honors ==
In 1995 Côté-Harper received the Pearson Medal.

In 1998, she was awarded the médaille du Barreau de Québec.

== Selected publications ==
- Côté-Harper, Gisèle; Manganas, Antoine D.; Turgeon, Jean (1989). Droit pénal canadien (in French). Cowansville: Blais. ISBN 978-2-89073-695-5.
