= Gerry Barr =

Canadian philanthropist

Gerry Barr is the 1996 recipient of the Pearson Medal of Peace for the creation of the Steelworkers Humanity Fund. He is formerly the National Executive Director and CEO of the Directors Guild of Canada.
