= Pearson Medal of Peace =

Annual peace award

The Pearson Medal of Peace (French: Médaille de la paix Pearson) is an award given out annually by the United Nations Association in Canada to recognize an individual Canadian's "contribution to international service". Nominations are made by any Canadian for any Canadian, excluding self-nominations. The medal was first announced in 1979 and named in honour of Lester B. Pearson, Nobel Peace Prize winner and Canada's fourteenth Prime Minister. The medal was to be selected by a jury of "eminent Canadians" and awarded by the Governor General of Canada on United Nations Day, October 24. After the 2004 medal was awarded to Roméo Dallaire, it was not awarded again until it was revived in 2011 to honour peace activist Ernie Regehr.

== Recipients of the Pearson Medal of Peace ==
- 1979 - Paul-Émile Léger
- 1980 - J. King Gordon
- 1981 - E. L. M. Burns
- 1982 - Hugh L. Keenleyside
- 1983 - George-Henri Lévesque
- 1984 - George Ignatieff
- 1985 - Lois Miriam Wilson
- 1986 - Meyer Brownstone
- 1987 - Nancy Meek Pocock
- 1988 - Edward Scott
- 1989 - Maurice Strong
- 1990 - Murray Thomson
- 1991 - Muriel Duckworth
- 1992 - Eric Hoskins
- 1993 - Escott Reid
- 1994 - Martin Connell
- 1995 - Gisèle Côté-Harper
- 1996 - Gerry Barr
- 1997 - Hanna Newcombe
- 1998 - Pat Roy Mooney
- 1999 - Flora MacDonald
- 2000 - No award made
- 2001 - Ursula M. Franklin
- 2002 - Alex Morrison
- 2003 - Stephen Lewis
- 2004 - Roméo Dallaire
- 2005 - 2009 - No award made
- 2010 - Ernie Regehr
- 2013 - Donald S. Ethell
- 2014 - Nigel Fisher
- 2016 - Louise Arbour
- 2017 - Lloyd Axworthy
- 2018 - Willie Littlechild
- 2019 - 2020 - No award made
- 2021 - Beverly McLachlin
- 2022 - John McGarry

== See also ==
- List of Canadian awards
