= Nova Scotia Voice of Women =

The Nova Scotia Voice of Women for Peace (NSVOW) is an active branch of the Canadian Voice of Women for Peace (VOW). Established in 1960, VOW is a local, national and international feminist Non Governmental Organization (NGO) composed of diverse women with consultative status at the United Nations Economic & Social Council (ECOSOC). For almost 50 years, VOW has advocated for a world without war. The organization's mandate is to "provide a means for women to promote world peace and justice, through education of themselves and others to take an equal part in the democratic process of decision making; and to cooperate with women throughout the world to create the mutual respect and understanding necessary for the peaceful resolution of international conflict."

== History ==
The Canadian Voice of Women began in 1960 as a social movement opposed to nuclear weapons. Muriel Duckworth and Peggy Hope-Simpson were among the founding members of the Nova Scotia Chapter. Although the group originally organized and met out of Muriel Duckworth's living room. Because of concerns raised by the Cold War, the time was ripe for ordinary women to become politically active. As Duckworth explained it:

The Voice of Women grew out of fear of nuclear testing in the 1950s. Around the country, there were already women on the verge of organizing a women's peace group and when it happened, women poured into the membership, because it was such a dangerous time. The women who had come here as war brides were just beside themselves because they couldn't bear the thought of another war.

== Activities ==
Among other activities, NSVOW holds a monthly vigil in Halifax, Canada, and co-hosts an annual Peace Day at the World Peace Pavilion in Dartmouth, NS, Canada on August 6, to commemorate the Hiroshima tragedy. Their current campaign includes encouraging Nova Scotia municipalities to join Mayors For Peace. They have also attended the White Poppy Campaign since 2020.

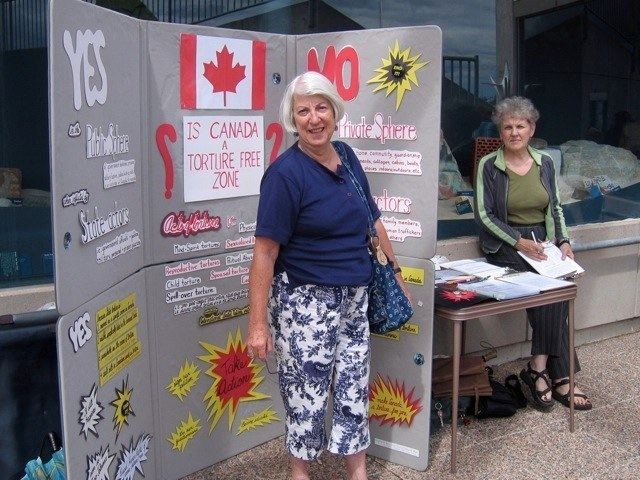
Non-State Actor Violence at 2008 Peace Day

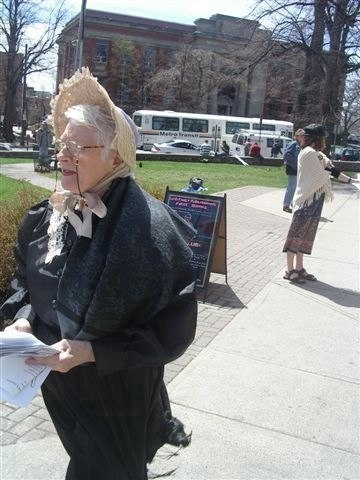
Monthly vigil in front of Spring Garden Library in Halifax

== See also ==
- List of anti-war organizations
