= Export and Import Permits Act =

Canadian trade law

Parliament of Canada
- Long title: An Act respecting the export, transfer and brokering of goods and technology and the import of goods
- Citation: R.S.C., 1985, c. E-19

The Export and Import Permits Act (French: Loi sur les licences d’exportation et d’importation, EIPA) is an Act passed by the Parliament of Canada originally in 1947 though it has had many amendments over the years. It was assented originally by King George VI through his agent the Governor General of Canada. At present, contraventions are punishable by a prison term not exceeding ten years. The EIPA falls under the control of the Minister of Foreign Affairs (Canada).
