= United Nations Association in Canada =

Canadian charitable organization, founded 1946

The United Nations Association in Canada (UNA-Canada, French: Association canadienne pour les Nations Unies) is a historic charitable organization focused on multilateralism in Canada. Established in 1946, UNA-Canada was a founding member of the World Federation of United Nations Association.

== Mission ==
UNA-Canada's stated mission is to educate and engage Canadians in the work of the United Nations and critical international issues. The organization promotes Canadian participation in the United Nations system and to growing global citizens in Canada who support the principles of the UN Charter.

The Association meets its mandate with a national network of 20,000 members and supporters, 20 volunteer branches spread from coast to coast and north into the Territories, and education programmes. The overarching mandate is to foster understanding of an engagement in the broad spectrum of the Sustainable Development Goals, which have been set as guiding principles for the UN System, and the global community as a whole, between 2015 and 2030.

UNA-Canada has five signature programme areas and aims to:

1. Be the Canadian Centre of Excellence in Model UN Assemblies (MUN) and other empathy-based learning innovations such as the New Diplomacy of Natural Resources.
2. Build and enhance the Association's internship programmes, such as the International Development & Diplomacy Internship Programme (IDDIP) and Canada Green Corps.
3. To celebrate United Nations Day, UN Season in Canada, and other UN designated days across Canada.
4. To implement national speaker/thinkers to elevate and increase national discussion on Canada's Place in the World.
5. To run Innovative Projects–Building a Better World that integrate or enhance the UN's charter and UNA-Canada's Strategic expertise. UNA-Canada's educational programmes, such as Sport-in-a-Box, Building Young Entrepreneurs for Sustainable Employment, and Canada's Diversity Advantage strongly emphasize diversity.

== Programmes ==
UNA-Canada runs various programmes, including:

- Accelerating Action on Climate Change highlights Canadian subnational government level actions on climate change.
- International Development & Diplomacy Internship Programme (IDDIP) gives qualified and motivated Canadian graduates and professionals an opportunity to gain international experience through field placements in the United Nations System as Junior Professional Consultants (JPCs).
- Canada Green Corps is a results-focused initiative that strategically fulfills government commitments to provide new opportunities for youth and showcase national leadership on climate action.
- Canadian International Model UN (CANIMUN) is a bilingual experiential learning simulation designed to provide youth with the ability to learn, negotiate, and exemplify representatives of the global community, crafting resolutions on security, human rights, environmental and humanitarian intervention issues.
- Active Citizens Social Enterprise trains young leaders to address the UN's Sustainable Development Goals in their local community.
- Building Young Entrepreneurs for Sustainable Employment helps vulnerable youth in finding gainful and lasting employment through skills training and business mentoring.
- Sport-in-a-Box is an educational programme aimed at encouraging children and youth participation in physical activity, healthy eating, and cross-cultural interaction through the universal language of sports.
- Canada's Diversity Advantage is a multi-generational and multicultural initiative identifying Canadian's lived-experiences, to cultivate a deeper understanding of how diverse cultures, faiths and ideas have contributed to building a diverse and inclusive society shaped by many cultures.
- Generation SDG empowers youth to pursue the Sustainable Development Goals in their communities through funding projects led by individuals and providing mentoring support.

== See also ==
- Pearson Medal of Peace
