= Murray Thomson =

Canadian peace activist (1922–2019)

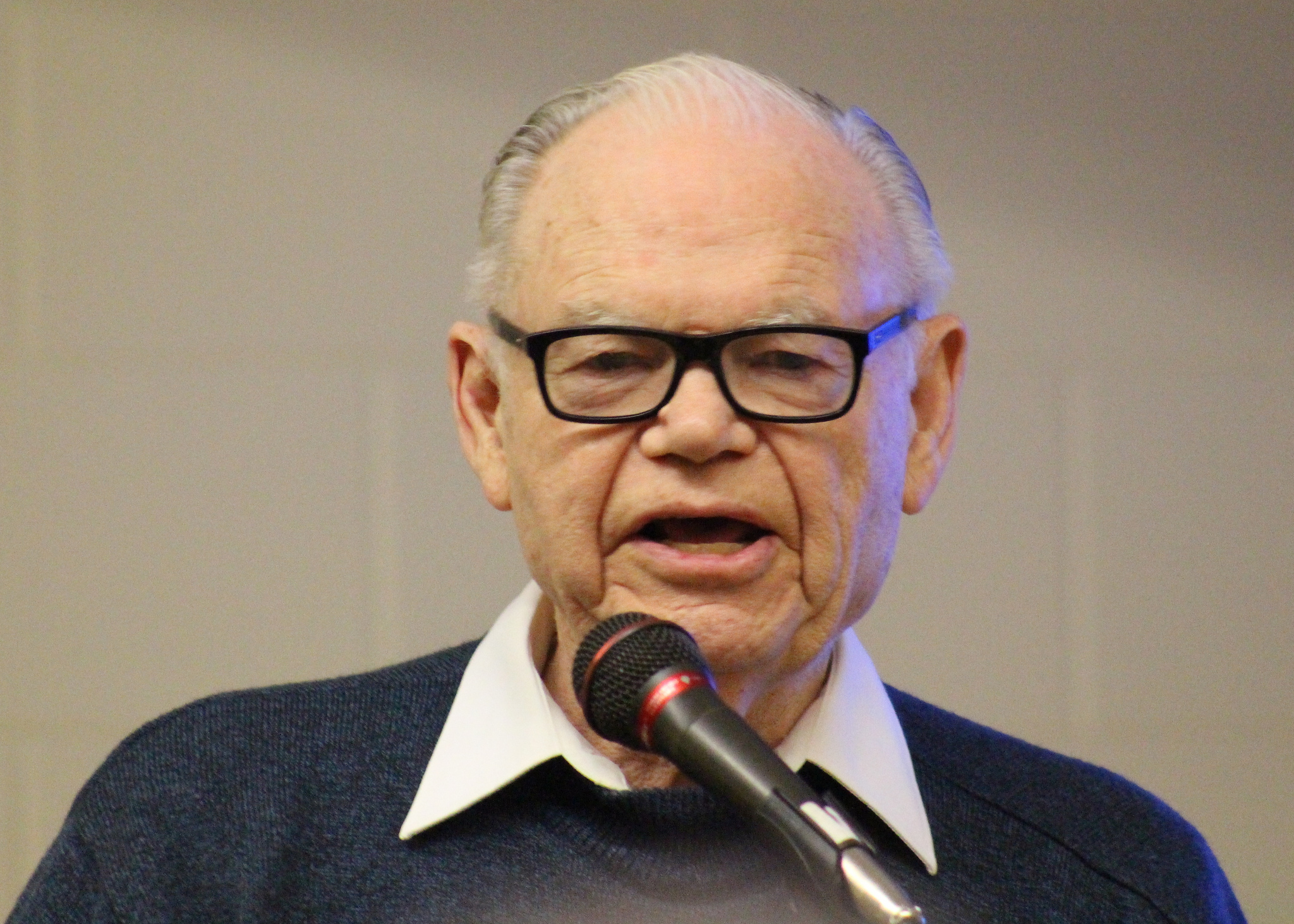
- Thomson in 2015
- Born: December 19, 1922; Honan, China
- Died: May 2, 2019 (aged 96); Ottawa, Ontario, Canada
- Awards: Pearson Medal of Peace (1990), Order of Canada (2001)

Murray McCheyne Thomson OC (December 19, 1922 – May 2, 2019) was a Canadian peace activist.

Thomson was born in Honan, China where his parents were Christian missionaries. Thomson founded many non-profits in Canada. He was the 1990 recipient of the Pearson Medal of Peace for his work in peace and justice and was made an Officer of the Order of Canada in 2001. He was also awarded the (Canadian) Golden Jubilee Medal and the Diamond Jubilee Medal. He is a former Executive Director of CUSO.

He is credited in helping the formation of:

- Grindstone Island
- The Peacefund Canada Foundation (1980s)
- Peace Brigades International (1981)
- Project Ploughshares (1976)
- Group of 78 (1980)
- Canadian Friends of Burma (1990)
- Canadians for a Nuclear Weapons Convention (2012)

Murray was a recognized international expert and advisor to governments, aid organizations, and lobbyists on disarmament and arms control. He was significantly involved in starting the United Nations World Disarmament Campaign and drafting its policy document, which was passed by the United Nations General Assembly. He continued to be active in advocating for disarmament into 2019. For several years he led a campaign among members of the Order of Canada in calling for an international Nuclear Weapons Convention. Over 1,030 members of the Order have signed the statement as of May 2019.

He died on May 2, 2019, in Ottawa, Canada.

His archives are held by William Ready Division of Archives and Research Collections at McMaster University in Hamilton, Ontario.

== Works ==
- Thomson, Murray (2015). Minutes to midnight : why more than 800 Order of Canada recipients call for nuclear disarmament (PDF). Ottawa, ON: Author. ISBN 978-0-9696808-1-9.
- A Time to Disarm: A Discussion Guide for Stimulating a National Dialogue on Canada and the UN's Special Session on Disarmament, 23 May - 28 June 1978 By Ernie Regehr and Murray Thomson
- Daring Confidence: The Life and Times of Andrew Thomson in China 1906–1942. By Murray Thomson
- Toward a Culture of Peace: Can We Afford to Pay the Price? By Murray Thomson
