= Martin Connell (businessman) =

Canadian businessman

Martin Philip Connell, OC, O.Ont is a Canadian businessman and philanthropist. He is the 1994 recipient of the Pearson Medal of Peace for his work in fighting poverty.

== Early life and career ==
Martin Connell and his wife Linda Haynes co-founded Calmeadow, an organization that traditionally supported the provision of credit and financial services to micro-entrepreneurs in developing countries who are unable to access traditional sources. Calmeadow is now operating out of San Jose Costa Rica under the direction of Alex Silva and the co-founders are no longer directly involved. In connection with his earlier association with Calmeadow, Martin is past chair of ProFund Internacional, S.A., former President of AfriCap MicroVentures Ltd., two regional investment funds with interests in local financial institutions providing credit and financial services to low-income self-employed people in Latin America and Africa. Profund has subsequently been wound up and its assets distributed to its investors. In addition to his involvement with Micro credit and microfinance, he has extensive involvement in various volunteer community activities. He was the founding chair of TIFF, the Toronto international film festival, past Chair of the Salvation Army Advisory Board, past chair of IMAGINE, a national philanthropic organization that promotes giving and volunteering, Chair of the Skydome (now the Rogers Centre) during its construction phase

Martin is immediate past Chair of the Board of Directors of the Toronto Community Foundation, a registered public charitable foundation that builds and manages individual funds that support local charitable organizations and whose mission is to connect philanthropy to community needs and opportunities. He is president and CEO of The Omega Foundation, which was established to promote financial self-sufficiency and financial literacy for low-income families. Martin holds honorary doctorate degrees from five Canadian universities. His other honours and awards include: International Association of Culinary Professionals (IACP) Humanitarian Award (2006), CESO Award for International Development (1997), Ontario Entrepreneur of the Year Award (1995), the Order of Ontario (1994), The Pearson Peace Medal from the United Nations Association in Canada (1994), and Officer of the Order of Canada (1998).

He is the co-founder, with his wife Linda Haynes, of ACE Bakery Limited, a Toronto, Ontario bakery serving wholesale and retail customers in Canada and the American east coast. He and his wife sold the company to a private equity firm in 2008. It is now owned and operated by George Weston Limited of Toronto. From 1965 until 1996 Martin occupied various executive positions at Conwest Exploration Company Limited. Conwest was founded by Martin's grandfather Frederick M. Connell in 1938 and was run as a successful mining company and subsequently oil and gas exploration and development company from the late 70s until the company was re-acquired in 1996 by Fletcher Smith.

His daughter Devin Connell owns the popular Toronto eatery Delica.
