= Canadian Voice of Women for Peace =

Canadian anti-nuclear pacifist organization

Canadian Voice of Women for Peace (French: Voix des femmes canadiennes pour la paix), also known as the Voice of Women or VOW, is a Canadian anti-nuclear pacifist organization that was formed in 1960. The organization was created in response to an article in which Lotta Dempsey, a journalist for the Toronto Star, called out for action against the threat of nuclear war and asked women to work together for peace. After the article was published, a group of women contacted Dempsey and formed a women's organization called the Canadian Voice of Women for Peace. The organization's work has spanned multiple decades and is Canada's oldest feminist peace group.

== Historical background ==
Peace activism expanded throughout much of North America during the mid to late twentieth century due to the controversies and violence surrounding the Cold War and Vietnam War. In particular, many Canadian women resisted and opposed these two political wars. To fight against the expansion of nuclear power and weapons during this era, the number of women-led Canadian pacifist organizations increased substantially. Specifically, many Canadian women questioned the potential environmental and health impacts resulting from nuclear warfare.

=== Membership ===
The Canadian Voice of Women for Peace grew to six thousand members shortly after its formation in 1960. Originally, women joined the organization to combat the proliferation of nuclear technologies during the Cold War. However, as the membership quickly increased throughout the country, the organization participated in multiple forms of anti-war activism. Many women who joined the Canadian Voice of Women for Peace participated in disarmament efforts, politics and social justice work within their respective communities. Throughout its first few months of activism, the Canadian Voice of Women for Peace quickly became one of the largest Canadian peace movement organizations.

Prominent women associated with the VOW include Beatrice Ferneyhough, Thérèse Casgrain, Ursula Franklin, Grace Hartman, and Kay Macpherson.

=== Structure ===
The organizational structure of the Canadian Voice of Women for Peace has historically been based on a feminist approach of building and promoting peaceful cultures. To accommodate the large membership across the country, the VOW has branches in multiple major Canadian cities. Throughout the years, the advocacy work of each branch has been organized by the National Central Committee (NCC). The NCC is the VOW's governing body that maintains the organization's feminist goals and creates different peace-building advocacies throughout the country. The NCC also connects the activism, campaigns, and projects of each VOW branch to one another.

== Activism ==
=== Campaigns ===
The Canadian Voice of Women for Peace organized several campaigns throughout the Cold War and Vietnam War. During the Cold War, the organization collected baby teeth in North America and demonstrated that they contained high amounts of strontium-90. Led by member and research physicist Ursula Franklin, the campaign showcased the dangerous effects of nuclear weapons and radioactive materials within the atmosphere. By presenting the reported increased levels of strontium-90 in baby teeth throughout the continent, the VOW pressured the Canadian federal government to promote a Nuclear Test Ban Treaty. During the Vietnam War, the organization developed a knitting campaign to help Vietnamese children living in conflict zones. Ontario VOW branch member Lil Greene led over 500 women to knit camouflaged clothing pieces for Vietnamese children. This campaign addressed the dangerous living conditions and survival tactics of Vietnamese children during the Vietnam War.

The Canadian Voice of Women for Peace's campaigns have influenced other women to form their own peace organizations in countries such as New Zealand, Scotland, the United Kingdom and the United States. The VOW's activism has most commonly been associated with the United States grassroots organization Women Strike for Peace (WSP). Although the WSP was a larger organization that focused more on demonstrative activism in comparison to the VOW, the two feminist organizations shared similar goals and collaborated at national and international peace conferences. Specifically, several WSP members were inspired to join the VOW's knitting campaign as they also opposed the Vietnam War. Until the WSP's disbandment in 1975, the Canadian Voice of Women for Peace maintained a close relationship with the United States anti-war feminist organization.

=== United Nations ===
Since its formation in 1960, the Canadian Voice of Women for Peace has worked with the United Nations. The organization held an International Conference of Women in 1962 where members came up with ways to fight against the threat of nuclear war. From this peace conference, the VOW requested that the United Nations create an International Year of Peace. Throughout the mid to late twentieth century, the VOW attended and participated in several United Nations conferences aimed at peace and conflict resolution. Most recently, the United Nations 2000 adoption of the Security Council Resolution 1325 on women, peace, and security was successfully approved due to the work of VOW and other international peace groups. This resolution acknowledged the protection of women and girls in conflict areas and also called for a gendered perspective on peace and security issues.

The Canadian Voice of Women for Peace is a recognized non-governmental organization within the United Nations and is associated with the Department of Public Information and the Economic and Social Council (ECOSOC). The VOW also currently holds consultative status within ECOSOC.

=== Current activism ===
The Canadian Voice of Women for Peace's activism currently focuses on issues relating to climate change, fighter jets and sustainability. The organization argues against military-industrial government spending and advocates for the dissolution of NATO.

The VOW is a group representative on the Canadian federal government's Consultative Group on Disarmament and Arms Control and the National Action Committee on the Status of Women.

== See also ==
- Anti-nuclear movement in Canada
- Canada and weapons of mass destruction
- Nuclear weapons debate
- Nova Scotia Voice of Women
- Women Strike for Peace
- Women's Peace Train
