= Cuso International =

Canadian international development organization

Cuso International logo

Cuso International (formerly known as CUSO, Canadian University Service Overseas) is a Canadian international development organization that connects communities around the world with skilled Canadians to help end poverty and inequality. Established in 1961, Cuso International has deployed more than 15,000 volunteers and has worked in more than 100 countries on long-term development projects.

Cuso envisions "a world where all people are able to realize their potential, develop their skills and participate fully in society." Its mission is to "reduce poverty and inequality through the combined efforts of volunteers, partners and donors." Cuso's priorities are focused on advancing gender equality and the empowerment of women and girls; improving access to and quality of economic opportunities for young people; and engaging volunteers to help achieve the United Nations Sustainable Development Goals. In 2018–19, programs benefited 4.15 million people—of which 72% were women and children—in 21 countries across four continents.

== History ==
=== 1960s ===
Cuso International, then Canadian University Service Overseas (CUSO), was launched on June 6, 1961, by a group of Canadian university graduates. Established as a national organization at a meeting at McGill University in Montréal, Cuso was to become the national non-denominational coordinating agency for recruiting Canadian volunteers for services overseas. In August 1961, the first 15 volunteers left for one-year placements in India, Sri Lanka and Malaysia with most working as teachers.

In 1962, 71 volunteers were placed in 13 different countries for two-year assignments, filling skill gaps as teachers, nurses and agriculturalists. By 1965, Cuso volunteers were working in Africa, South America and Asia. That same year, the Canadian government began providing direct financial assistance and by 1968, more than 1,000 volunteers were serving overseas in close to 40 countries in the education and health sectors.

=== 1970s and 1980s ===
Cuso began recruiting experienced professionals to serve as volunteers in the 1970s. In 1971, programming expanded to the Caribbean and Cuso launched its first large-scale project to rebuild schools in Nigeria following the civil war. Cuso's programs expanded to Central America in 1973 and the organization started posting regional directors overseas and created field staff positions.

At home in Canada, Cuso began traveling cross-country in a "Mobile Learning Centre," with an aim toward improving international development information and influencing Canadian government trade and aid policies. In the late 1970s, Cuso became more politically engaged, providing humanitarian aid to South Africa's liberation movement and working for social and political change with Latin American partners.

Cuso changed its name in 1981, from the Canadian University Service Overseas to simply Cuso to reflect the fact that universities were no longer the sole recruitment sites. From 1984 to 1985, Cuso began creating partnerships between Canadian organizations and international groups working for social justice in the Global South. One of the first examples was a 1985 program that led to cooperation between the Saskatchewan-based Grain Services Union and SINITAB, the workers’ union at Mozambique’s largest food-processing plant.

=== 1990s and 2000s ===
In 1992, Cuso launched an initiative to link Indigenous peoples in Canada with Indigenous communities in Colombia. Sustainable economic alternatives and the cultural survival of Indigenous peoples became the organization's primary focus. In the latter half of the 1990s, Cuso was involved in a number of initiatives, including the Jubilee 2000 campaign for debt relief of the poorest countries and NetCorps, a project to send Canadian youth with IT skills on short-term overseas placements. In 1997, Cuso shifted its focus to human rights, the environment and securing livelihoods.

As partnerships between organizations from the Global North and South continued, Cuso began to recruit volunteers in the Global South for south–north and South-South placements in 1999. In 2008, Cuso and VSO Canada merged to become Cuso-VSO. That iteration of the organization became Canada's largest international cooperation agency working through volunteers.

=== 2010s ===
Cuso celebrated 50 years of international development work on June 6, 2011. Later that same year, Cuso and VSO decided to go their separate ways and the organization becomes Cuso International. In 2015, Cuso began to actively recruit diaspora volunteers and launched its e-volunteer program, allowing volunteers to contribute their expertise virtually.

In 2018–2019, Cuso volunteers contributed more technical assistance and support to beneficiaries, partners and clients than in any previous year. Cuso was also recognized as a 2019 recipient of the Hire Immigrants Ottawa Employer Excellence award.

=== Executive Directors ===
- 1961-62: Lewis Perinbam (acting)
- 1962-66: Bill McWhinney
- 1966: Terry Glavin (acting)
- 1966-68: Hugh Christie
- Bogdasavich, Frank (February 1, 1969). "How To Be A Global Villager". Maclean's. Archived from the original on July 21, 2019.
- 1970-71: John Wood
- 1971: David Catmur (acting)
- 1971-73: John Gordon
- 1973-76: Murray Thomson
- Francis, Diane (March 26, 1979). "Go abroad, young man, the home front's hell". Maclean's. Archived from the original on September 20, 2019.
- 1979: David Hamilton (acting)
- Gray, Malcolm (June 9, 1986). "CUSO's quarter-century". Maclean's. Archived from the original on September 20, 2019.
- 1983-90: Chris Bryant
- 1990-94: Lyse Blanchard
- 1995: Patricia Hurdle (acting)
- 1995: David Hamilton (acting)
- 1995-2000: Melanie Macdonald
- 2001-06: Claire Dansereau
- 2006-08: Jean-Marc Mangin
- 2008-15: Derek Evans
- 2015-16: Evelyne Guindon
- 2017–present: Glenn Mifflin

== Priorities ==
=== Advance gender equality and the empowerment of women and girls ===
Using the Canada Feminist International Assistance Policy, Cuso International works in a number of areas that intersect with gender equality and the empowerment of women and girls. In conjunction with women's rights organizations, various levels of state and federal governments, health departments and hospitals, and other NGOs, Cuso and its partners work to increase access to quality reproductive maternal and newborn health care; advocate for women's rights and gender-sensitive policies; increase women's participation in decision-making; and eradicate gender-based violence and harmful traditional practices.

=== Improve access to and quality of economic opportunities for young people ===
Accounting for 16 per cent of the global population, young people between the ages of 15 and 24 are three times more likely to be unemployed than adults, and young women are twice as likely to be unemployed and without access to education or training as young men. Cuso International and its partner organizations work with youth populations to provide education, training, hands-on experience and mentorship opportunities.

=== Engage volunteers to help achieve the Sustainable Development Goals ===
Volunteering is "at the heart" of Cuso International's global efforts to reduce poverty and inequality. Cuso volunteers are skilled professionals who work with community-based partners around the world to build skills and transfer knowledge, one of the most sustainable ways to address development needs.
