= Provincial research organization =

Provincial research organizations (PROs) are Canadian provincial government initiatives to promote research and development and adoption of technology in their respective provinces. The first PRO in Canada was the Alberta Research Council. Statistics Canada reports on the activities of PROs.

PROs focus on applied research and technical services and generally specialize in industry sectors that are native to their provinces. Because they play an important role in growing and sustaining industry, they are considered a key component of provincial economic development strategies. PROs are also consulted by the government for innovation and economic development policy input. PROs are sustained through the combination of provincial grants and fees for services.

PROs have been established in Canada as follows:

- Alberta Research Council (1921)
- Ontario Research Foundation (1928)
- British Columbia Research Council (1944) and now the BC Innovation Council
- Nova Scotia Research Foundation (1946)
- Saskatchewan Research Council (1947)
- New Brunswick Research and Productivity Council (1962)
- Manitoba Research Council (1963)
- Centre de Recherche Industrielle du Québec (1969)

In 2009, Newfoundland and Labrador formed the Newfoundland and Labrador Research and Development Council.
