= Defence Production Sharing Agreement =

Bilateral trade agreement between the US and Canada

The Defence Production Sharing Agreement (DPSA) is a bilateral trade agreement between the United States and Canada that aims to balance the amount of military cross-border buying in order to avoid trade imbalances. Since its signing in 1956, it has led to a number of US companies sending military production to Canada in order to "offset" Canadian purchases of US military equipment. The Agreement has been amended on several occasions. The similar Defense Development Sharing Program organized sharing of military research and development.

== Overview ==
The Canada-U.S. Defence Production Sharing Agreement (DPSA) was formalized in 1959 and codified specific measures to remove barriers to reciprocal procurement and integration of defense production, resulting in a “quid pro quo” arrangement. The U.S. waived the Buy American Act, putting Canadian industry on equal footing with U.S. firms when bidding on U.S. defense contracts. The U.S. also removed domestic price preference and import duties for Canadian defense goods produced for the Department of Defense and U.S. prime contractors. For the Canadians, the DPSA established “the US as producer of major defense systems and Canada as the producer of subsystems and components for the US market”, which inextricably linked U.S. and Canadian production capacity and supply chains of the joint industrial base.

The Canadian Commercial Corporation (CCC) is a Crown corporation that administers the DPSA on behalf of the Government of Canada. Under the DPSA, CCC acts as Prime Contractor on U.S. DoD contracts for purchases from Canada and supports Canadian export activity under the DPSA. The DPSA is CCC's core public policy mandate, which enables Canadian exporters to compete for contracts as part of the U.S. Department of Defense domestic supply base. In 2019–2020, CCC facilitated $928 million in sales to the US DoD under the DPSA.

=== Objectives ===
The objectives of the Defense Production Sharing Agreement include:

(a) Achieving greater integration of both Canada’s and the United States’ military development and production capabilities while maintaining greater standardization of military equipment, wider dispersal of production facilities, and establishing a supply of supplemental sources.

(b) Establishing Canada as a trusted acquisition partner, and ensuring that Canadian defense vendors are given equal and immediate consideration for U.S. Department of Defense (U.S. DoD) procurements—similar to American vendors—with certain exceptions.

(c) Setting forth policies and procedures with respect to all contracts for supplies and services placed by the U.S. DoD with the Canadian Commercial Corporation (CCC).

=== Effect and Duration ===
The DPSA applies to all contracts placed, on or after October 1, 1956, by any U.S. military department with the Canadian Commercial Corporation (CCC). It remains in force from year to year until terminated by mutual consent; however, it can be terminated by either party provided that six months' notice of termination has been given in writing.

=== Costing ===
The DPSA includes provisions that place limits on the amount of profit that suppliers can gain from procurement contracts sourced under the Agreement; it also mandates that the CCC refund profits in excess of these amounts. The CCC is responsible for initiating audits to ensure costs and profits are in accordance with mutually agreed-upon practices, policies and procedures. The Agreement also states that the Canadian Government and its Departments and Agencies cannot profit from any contracts covered by the Agreement. Accordingly, contracts with the United States Department of Defense (U.S. DoD) are not subject to a CCC fee under the DPSA. The Agreement also excludes taxes and customs duties from being added to contracts awarded under the DPSA.

=== Funding ===
As a part of the 2021 Federal Budget, the Government of Canada has reinstated an annual appropriation to CCC for the administration of the DPSA.

== Scope in Relation to Other Canada-U.S. Defence Trade Agreements ==
=== Defense Federal Acquisition Regulation Supplement (DFARS) ===
While the DPSA removes barriers for Canadian companies selling to the U.S. DoD, the actual laws and regulations that govern purchases are detailed in the Federal Acquisition Regulations (FAR) and more specifically the Defense Federal Acquisition Regulation Supplement (DFARS):

- DFARS 225.872 waives limitations of the Buy American Act
- DFARS 252.225-7013 allows Canadian goods to be shipped to the U.S. duty-free
- DFARS 225.870-8 recognizes Public Services and Procurement Canada site and employee security clearances
- DFARS 225.801-1 identifies the Canadian Commercial Corporation (CCC) as Prime Contractor for all contracts over US$250,000

In addition, U.S. DoD Instruction 2035.01 recognizes Canadian companies as equal and valuable participants in the North American industrial base.

=== Defence Development Sharing Agreement (DDSA) ===
Signed in 1963, eight years after the DPSA, the Defence Development Sharing Agreement (DDSA) allows Canadian companies to enter into U.S. DoD-led research and development projects, and is designed to provide Canada the same access to future U.S. DoD requirements for Research and Development projects as American companies. Canadian technologies created under the DDSA can be procured by the U.S. DoD under the DPSA.

=== NASA Letter of Agreement ===
Following the establishment of the DPSA, in 1960 the U.S. National Aeronautics and Space Administration (NASA) signed a Letter of Agreement (LOA) with the CCC. The LOA institutes a similar level of support to NASA and sets forth policies and procedures with respect to the administration of contracts awarded to Canadian firms through the CCC.

== Economic impact ==
Since the signing of the DPSA in 1956, the Canadian Commercial Corporation (CCC) has acted as Prime Contractor for DPSA contracts totaling more than $30 Billion.

In 2021–2022, the CCC facilitated contracts for 151 different Canadian companies and signed $868 Million in new export contracts with Canadian suppliers to deliver goods and services under the DPSA.

From 2012 to 2021, the total value of DPSA contracts with different U.S. DoD military buying commands were: Department of the Air Force ($1.03 Billion), Naval Air Warfare Center ($651 Million), Tank-Automotive and Armaments Command ($521 Million), Development & Engineering Center ($502 Million), and the Naval Surface Warfare Center ($474 Million).
