= Walter Fuller =

Walter Fuller may refer to:

- Walter Fuller (editor) (1881–1927), poet, anti-war activist and editor
- Walter Fuller (musician) (1910–2003), jazz trumpeter and vocalist
- Gil Fuller (1920–1994) composer
