= People's Freedom Union =

American political group

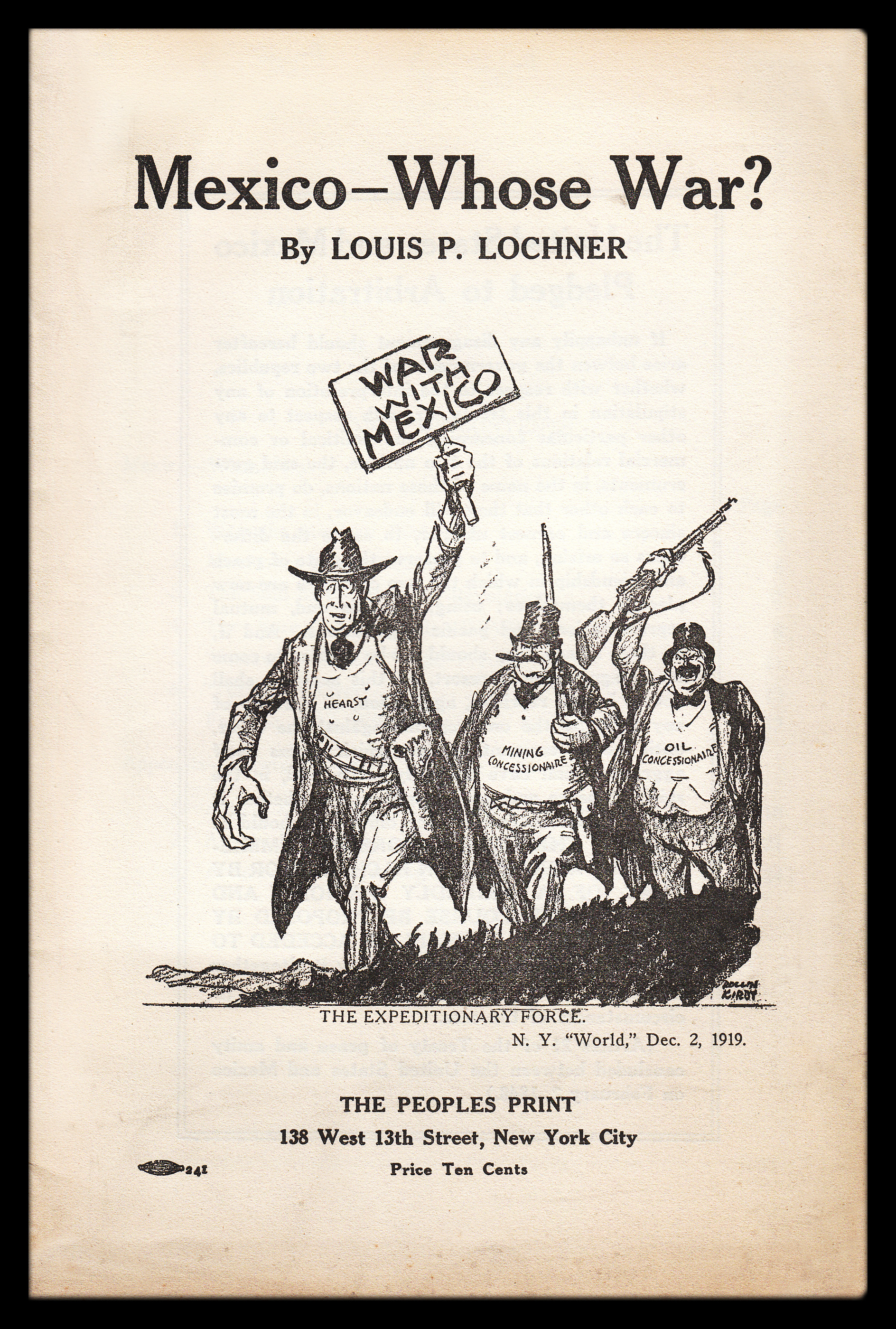
Cover of a pamphlet by Louis P. Lochner published by the People's Freedom Union, circa December 1919

The People's Freedom Union was a left wing American political group which existed from 1919 to 1920. Established as a federation of liberal and radical organizations in New York City, the People's Freedom Union conducted marches in support of political prisoners detained under the Espionage Act during World War I, campaigned for a restoration of American civil rights suspended under the war, and agitated against American intervention in Mexico and Soviet Russia.

== Organizational History ==
=== Establishment ===
The People's Freedom Union was the organizational successor of the People's Council of America, an anti-war organization established in New York City by pacifist and socialist political activists in an effort to end American participation in the European war. The group was headquartered at 138 West 13th Street, premises it shared with the American Civil Liberties Union. The organization declared itself a federation of "several New York groups" which intended to practice "the One Big Union idea applied to the peace-and-freedom movement."

The People's Freedom Union was organized in opposition to the expansion of militarism and imperialism in the post-war world. It declared in its literature that "imperialism is not dead, even though the kaiser and the other emperors have gone" and postulated that the empire-building foreign policy of Great Britain, France, Japan, the United States, and other nations was setting the table for a new round of war. The group therefore sought to organize "liberal and radical forces of the world" in advance of the next conflagration, to "get ready now before the passions of war again sweep them aside."

The group also sought the reestablishment of American civil liberties suspended during the World War I under the Espionage Act, declaring that "democracy without the unrestricted right to discuss public policies is the shabbiest of pretenses." It cited the recent banning and dispersal of public meetings, suppression of dissident newspapers, and the deportation and imprisonment of critical public speakers as examples of the abusive state of then-current law.

The People's Freedom Union declared its intent to take on "concrete tasks not already covered" by other groups participating in the federation, with a design to "gradually absorb other groups". The group was governed by an executive committee, with permanent officers and committees organized around specific projects handling day-to-day affairs.

The People's Freedom Union maintained a publication department under the imprint of "The People's Print", which issued weekly leaflets on pertinent topics in the news and was responsible for the issuance and sale of occasional pamphlets. The group also established a speaker's bureau which coordinated speaking tours of "men and women of national and international note who have a message bearing upon the objects for which the organization stands."

=== Activities ===
The People's Freedom Union organized a march up Fifth Avenue in New York on Christmas morning, 1919, in support of political prisoners. The march was to be followed by a dispersal in groups of 10 to picket on behalf of prisoners outside churches throughout New York City in hopes of stirring attendees in support of the cause of freeing prisoners of conscience jailed under the Espionage Act during the war. The march was ultimately broken up by the New York Police Department.

A critic of the organization later opined that this demonstration a "rather melodramatic", in which the participants paraded in single file, carrying banners in support of their cause. This criticism, contained in the report of the Lusk Committee established in 1919 by the New York State Senate, declared that marchers had been "led astray with respect to the great forces at play on the public opinion of the American people" and that:

The persons who have participated in this movement, not necessarily familiar with the objects and the purposes which actuate it, are sowing the seeds of disorder and doing their part to imperil the structure of American institutions.

The organization also organized a demonstration on February 12, 1920, at the White House in Washington, DC, in an effort to move President Woodrow Wilson to grant amnesty to political prisoners.

=== Membership ===
Executive Secretary of the People's Freedom Union was Frances M. Witherspoon.

Secretary of the Free Political Prisoners Committee of the People's Freedom Union was Tracy Dickinson Mygatt. Other well-known individuals involved in the organization included Evans Clark, Elizabeth Gurley Flynn, Lewis Gannett, Harry W. Laidler, Jessica Smith, and Norman Thomas, as well as sociologist Winthrop D. Lane.

== Publications ==
- Alice Riggs Hunt, Facts about Communist Hungary Previous to its Overthrow by the Supreme Council at Paris. New York: The People's Press, n.d. [c. 1919].
- Louis P. Lochner, Mexico — Whose War? New York: The People's Press, n.d. [c. 1919].
- Scott Nearing and Eugene V. Debs, Before the Court: Nearing — Debs. New York: The People's Press, n.d. [c. 1919].
- Albert Rhys Williams, Russian Soviets: Seventy-six Questions and Answers on the Workingman's Government of Russia. New York: The People's Press, n.d. [c. 1919].
- Frances Fenwick Williams, The Winnipeg General Strike. New York: The People's Press, n.d. [c. 1919].
- Legislative Committee of the People's Freedom Union, The Truth About the Lusk Committee. New York: The Nation Press, March 1920.

== See also ==
- American Civil Liberties Union
- People's Council of America for Democracy and Peace
