= Rosalinde Fuller =

British actress (1892–1982)

- Rosalind Fuller in publicity photograph for the Fuller Sisters
- Born: Rosalind Ivy Fuller; 16 February 1892; Portsmouth, Hampshire, England, United Kingdom of Great Britain and Ireland
- Died: 15 September 1982 (aged 90); London, England, United Kingdom
- Resting place: Middleton Cheney Cemetery, Northamptonshire, England
- Occupation: Actress
- Years active: 1929–1949

Rosalinde Fuller MBE (born Rosalind Ivy Fuller; 16 February 1892 – 15 September 1982) was a British actress.

== Early life ==
Rosalind Ivy Fuller was the third of four daughters born to a Portsmouth draper, whose eldest child was a son, Walter (born 1881). Behind the draper’s shop was a hall in which Mr Fuller organized free public entertainment on Sunday afternoons, having his daughters recite, sing and play various instruments – the eldest girl learned the harp, for instance. Rosalind, who was called Ivy by her family until she was 21, when she opted for her first given name, always disliked having to perform on stage because she suffered agonies of self-consciousness.

Having incautiously underwritten a friend’s research, Mr Fuller was made bankrupt in 1908, and Walter (who was editing periodicals in London) became financially responsible for the family. He had always encouraged his eldest sister to collect and learn folksongs; in 1911, she and Rosalind visited Cecil Sharp, the great collector of folksongs, and sang him some. He was entranced and immediately had them demonstrate for him, first at the Festival of Empire and then at the Stratford-upon-Avon Summer School of Folksong and Dance. Visiting Americans exclaimed how charming they sounded, and they formed a project of going to the United States to perform over there.

== Singer ==
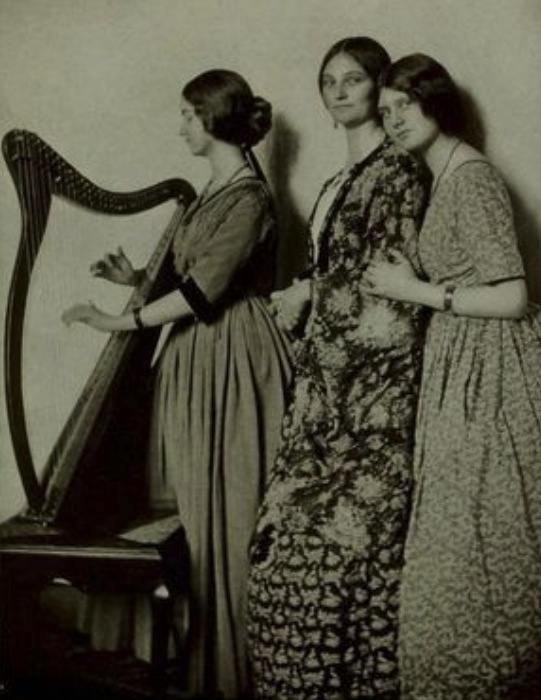
Cynthia, Dorothy and Rosalind Fuller

Walter embraced the idea of making their fortunes in the New World. With him as their musical director, impresario, and chaperone, the three older sisters – including Rosalind, then – arrived in New York at Christmas 1911, with enough money for three weeks in a hotel. They would have to make enough money by singing to pay for their return ticket. They were an instant success; within six months they were invited to sing at the White House, but left for home before they could fit the President into their busy schedule. At this point, the eldest sister (who had studied the harp and singing at the Royal College of Music) got married and was replaced by the youngest. As The Fuller Sisters they continued making immensely successful tours, with Rosalind their most bewitching performer. President Woodrow Wilson invited them to sing for him on two occasions, once at the White House and once at his summer residence. Their career ended when the entry of the US into World War I wiped out the demand for folksongs.

During these tours, they continued to collect folksongs, and Rosalind alerted Cecil Sharp to the work of Olive Dame Campbell; he immediately undertook the research on which half of his reputation is founded. After Walter married Crystal Eastman, the great socialist feminist, Rosalind (who had embraced a philosophy of free love long before she knew what this actually implied) had sex with Crystal’s brother Max. Shortly after, she slept with Walter's friend Norman Angell. She maintained intimate relations with both men for many years.

Back in England after World War I, Rosalind decided that she wanted to go on the stage, and signed on as a chorus girl with a Paris troupe that she had never previously heard of, the Folies Bergère. Eight months later, she sailed for New York, having decided to try her chance as an actress there. Within weeks, she met the as yet unknown writer F. Scott Fitzgerald; he had just handed in the MS of This Side of Paradise (1920) to Scribner’s. During their affair, she inspired him with a short story (published as Head and Shoulders) which his agent sold to the Saturday Evening Post for $300 and then the film rights to it for $2500. This money enabled him to marry Zelda, who had put their engagement on hold until he earned some money.

== Actress ==
Fuller's acting career began in 1920 (What's in a Name), soon followed by the role of Ophelia to John Barrymore's Hamlet on Broadway in 1922 – the most famous production of Hamlet yet. After many other stage appearances, some with the Provincetown Players, she and her partner, the photographer Francis Bruguière, moved to London in 1927. At this point, she took the opportunity to drop nine years off her age, which is why many sources erroneously give her birth year as 1901. She also added an "e" at the end of her forename for professional reasons.

She had a busy stage career in Britain, starting with The Squall (1927) and The Unknown Warrior (1928). Over the following thirty years, she appeared in about sixty different stage plays and acted in at least a dozen radio plays. In the mid-1950s, she launched her own solo show of monodramas which she adapted from short stories. During the 1960s she performed these throughout the world under the auspices of the British Council. She continued to act until the late 1970s. Between 1929 and 1935, she appeared in seven films, most notably Escape Me Never, and in at least four tv dramas between 1939 and 1949, including Britain's first live broadcast television play, Rehearsal for a Drama (1939).

In the University of Bristol theatre collection there is a portrait of Fuller as she appeared in The Marble Heart, painted by Max Chapman (1911–1999).

== Honours ==
For her lifetime career on the stage, she was appointed Member of the Order of the British Empire (MBE) in the 1966 New Year honours.

== Filmography ==
- The Unwritten Law (1929) – the first British 'talkie'
- The Message (1930)
- Contraband Love (1931)
- Perfect Understanding (1933)
- Song of the Plough (aka County Fair) (1933)
- Perfect Understanding 1933
- Escape Me Never (1935)
- Immortal Gentleman (1935)

== Bibliography ==
- Coursen, Herbert R. Contemporary Shakespeare Production. Peter Lang, 2010.
- Canterbery, Ray & Thomas D. Birch. F. Scott Fitzgerald: Under the Influence. Paragon House, 2006.
- Fuller, Rosalinde. Kissing the Joy: the Autobiography of Rosalinde Fuller. Letterworth Press, 2016. ISBN 978-2-9700654-4-9
- Winnington, G. Peter. Walter Fuller: the Man Who Had Ideas. Letterworth Press, 2014. ISBN 978-2-9700654-2-5 and 978-2-9700654-3-2
