= Evans Clark =

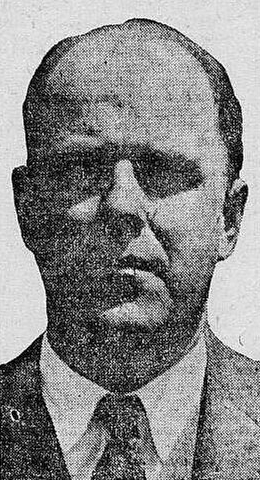
- Clark c. 1926
- Born: August 9, 1888; Orange, New Jersey, U.S.
- Died: August 29, 1970 (aged 82); Nyon, Switzerland
- Education: Columbia University
- Occupation: Writer
- Spouse: Freda Kirchwey

Evans Clark (August 9, 1888 – August 29, 1970) was an American writer strongly committed first to Communist and Socialist causes and then liberal socio-economic issues, served for a quarter century as first executive director of the Twentieth Century Fund (renamed The Century Foundation), and was husband of Freda Kirchwey (editor and publisher of The Nation magazine, to which he contributed).

== Background ==
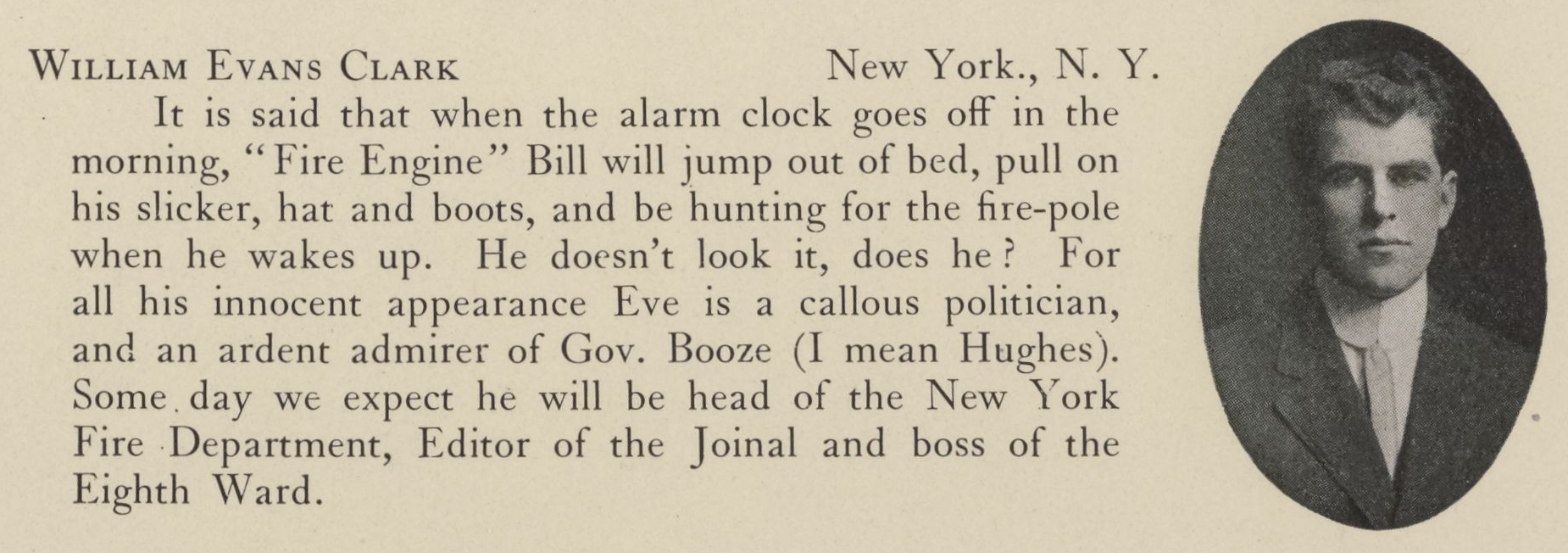
Clark in the Amherst College yearbook, 1910

Evans Clark was born on August 9, 1888, in Orange, New Jersey. His parents were William Brewster Clark, a New York physician, and Fanny Cox. He attended private schools in New York City and The Hill School in Pottstown, Pennsylvania. In 1910, he earned a BA from Amherst College. He studied law in Columbia University but received an MA in government and politics in 1913.

== Career ==
=== Early career ===
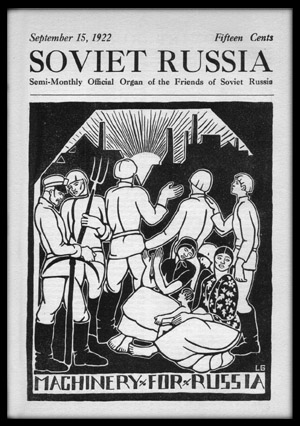
The RSGB, for which Clark worked, published Soviet Russia magazine, later turned over to Friends of Soviet Russia organization

In 1913, Clark began his career as instructor in government at Princeton University. In 1917, he became research director for the Socialist members of the New York Board of Aldermen.

In 1919, Clark became assistant director of a commercial department and then director information for the Russian Soviet Government Bureau (AKA the "Soviet Bureau"), an unofficial diplomatic organization established by the Russian Soviet Federative Socialist Republic in the United States during the Russian Civil War (1919–1920). On March 28, 1919, and April 11, 1919 The New York Times published articles urging to close what it deemed the illegal representation of the Soviet Bureau. A number of government agencies conducted inquiries of the RSGB prior to its office being raided, including investigations by the U.S. Department of Justice, the U.S. Treasury Department, the Directorate of Military Intelligence, and the War Trade Board. Information was provided as requested, with Soviet Bureau official Evans Clark noting to assistant director of the War Trade Board G.M. Bodman at a meeting on April 25, 1919, that the bureau "had nothing to conceal" and was "glad to furnish information to those entitled to have it." Additionally, Martens and his lawyer Charles Recht had met personally with officials of the Department of Justice in April and May, while Clark travelled to Washington, D.C. to consult with the personal secretary of U.S. Attorney General A. Mitchell Palmer.

In 1919, Clark also joined the left-wing American People's Freedom Union (1919–1920). The union's executive secretary was Frances M. Witherspoon, and secretary of it Free Political Prisoners Committee was Tracy Dickinson Mygatt. Other members included Elizabeth Gurley Flynn, Lewis Gannett, Harry W. Laidler, Jessica Smith, and Norman Thomas, as well as sociologist Winthrop D. Lane.

In 1920, he helped organize the Labor Bureau, Inc. (LBI), an independent professional group, with George Henry Soule Jr., Alfred L. Bernheim, David J. Saposs. The LBI acted as economic advisers and public relations counselors for labor unions.

Case of the Rand School published on July 26, 1919, by the Rand School of Social Science, where Clark taught

Clark taught at the Rand School of Social Science (a "property of the American Socialist Society") as a "specialist in municipal affairs." Fellow "noted lecturers and teachers" there included: Charles A. Beard, historian (Bureau of Municipal Research); Franklin H. Giddings; Alexander Goldenweiser; Benjamin B. Kendrick; William P. Montague; David Saville Muzzey; James Harvey Robinson; E. M. Sait; James T. Shotwell; Lester F. Ward; David Starr Jordan; Willard C. Fisher; Ellen Hayes; Vida D. Scudder; Charles Zueblin; Juliet Stuart Poyntz; Dorothy Brewster; George R. Kirkpatrick; Harry W. L. Dana; Morris Hillquit; W.E.B. DuBois; Jack London; and Max Eastman among others.

In the early 1920s the Socialist Party was in severe membership decline and funding of the New York Call became correspondingly tenuous. In a last-ditch effort to save the paper, it was reorganized in the fall of 1923 to include non-Socialists in its management. On October 1, 1923, the name of the paper was formally changed to the New York Leader as a reflection of this new orientation. Pacifist minister Norman Thomas, formerly of The World Tomorrow, was named as editor of the publication. Heber Blankenhorn became managing editor, Evans Clark business manager, and Ed Sullivan sportswriter. This effort to stabilize the daily newspaper's funding was unsuccessful, however, and the New York Leader was terminated just six weeks later.

In 1925, Clark wrote editorials, books reviews, and feature stories for the New York Times through 1928.

=== Twentieth Century Fund ===
Logo of The Century Foundation, formerly the Twentieth Century Fund, with which Clark was a leader for nearly a half century

In 1928, Clark became the first executive director of the Twentieth Century Fund (founded by Boston merchant Edward A. Filene), a role he served until 1958.

The fund conducted economic research and fostered public education on economic problems. Under Clark, the fund began its own research into controversial areas, "working on the theory that controversy is an index of a topic's importance and of the need for its objective study." Topics included: consumer credit, pre-payment group medical service, economic sanctions in relation to peace, internal debts of the United States of America, old age security, and labor cartels.

From 1958 to his death in 1970, Evans remained a member of the fund's board of trustees.

=== Other efforts ===
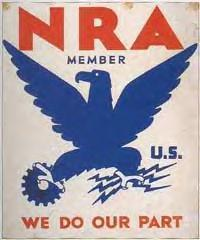
Logo of the National Recovery Administration, which Clark served for New York in the 1930s

In 1935, Evans became an economic advisor to the New York City Housing Authority, which he served until 1937. Concurrently, he served as chairman of the board of directors of the National Public Housing Conference. Concurrently, he served as chairman of the New York State Adjustment Board of the National Recovery Administration.

In 1937, he served on the panel of arbitrators of the New York City Labor Relations Board.

In 1944, Clark was a major co-founder of the Health Insurance Plan of Greater New York, a non-profit organization that eventually provided medical care through 30 groups to more than 750,000 people in the New York City area.

After World War II, he became a champion for world peace and offered his views for the post-war world publicly:

We as a people know much more clearly now than we did when the last war ended what we want of the peace. We want no more Depression this time. We want work; we want to be able to buy, with the money we earn, decent food, clothing and homes to live in; we want security in illness and old age; we want our children educated; and we want at least some of the luxuries that science and machinery have paraded before our eyes—an automobile, a radio, household conveniences.

=== New York Times ===
As earlier mentioned, in 1925, Clark wrote editorials, books reviews, and feature stories through 1928.

From 1954 to 1962, he served as a member of the NYT's editorial board and wrote about social and economic issues.

== Personal and death ==
In November 1915, Evans married Freda Kirchwey, editor and publisher of The Nation magazine. They had three sons, of whom only one, Michael, survived childhood.

Evans died age 82 on August 28, 1970, in Nyon, Switzerland, where his wife and he were visiting their son.

== Legacy ==
At his death, the New York Times wrote in tribute:

Long before Franklin D. Roosevelt's New Deal vastly expanded the nation's concepts of social responsibility, Evans Clark was helping to broaden the horizons of public thought on unmet needs in housing, health and other neglected areas. As a member of the editorial board of this newspaper and as director of the Twentieth Century Fund, he brought erudition and compassion to the illumination of social issues...

== Writings ==
Books:

Clark wrote the following:

- Facts and Fabrications about Soviet Russia (1920)

Clark co-wrote the following:

- The Socialists in the New York Board of Aldermen: A Record of Six Months' Activity (1918)
- Financing the Consumer (1930)
- Boycotts and Peace (1932)
- How to Budget Health: Guilds for Doctors and Patients (1933)
- The International Debts of the United States (1933)
- Stock Market Control (1934)

Articles: Clark wrote articles based on fund studies and his own research into social and economic problems for the New York Times, The Nation, and other publications.

== See also ==
- Russian Soviet Government Bureau (AKA the "Soviet Bureau")
- People's Freedom Union
- Rand School of Social Science
- Twentieth Century Fund (The Century Foundation)
- Freda Kirchwey
- The Nation
