= People's Council of America for Democracy and the Terms of Peace =

The People's Council of America for Democracy and the Terms of Peace, commonly known as the "People's Council," was an American pacifist political organization established in New York City in May 1917. Organized in opposition to the Woodrow Wilson administration's decision to take the United States into World War I, the People's Council attempted to mobilize American workers and intellectuals against the war effort by publishing literature and conducting mass meetings and public demonstrations. The organization's dissident views made it a target of federal, state, and local authorities, who disrupted its meetings and arrested a number of its leading participants under provisions of the Espionage Act. The People's Council was succeeded in 1919 by a new group based in the same New York City headquarters, the People's Freedom Union.

== Organizational history ==
=== Forerunners ===
The eruption of World War I in August 1914 saw its response in the United States of America with the emergence of a national peace movement. One of the pioneer American pacifist organizations was the Woman's Peace Party, initiated by Chicago social worker Jane Addams. In October 1914, the Minneapolis chapter of this organization passed a "Tentative Program for a Constructive Peace," which called for the convocation of an international conference of Neutral countries to bring an end to the European conflict. The Woman's Peace Party organized a mass meeting in Chicago early in December 1914, from which emerged a December 19 session which brought together 21 delegates from various peace, labor, political, religious, and civic organizations. This alliance of interested organizations constituted itself as the Chicago Emergency Peace Federation.

The Emergency Peace Federation elected socialist Louis P. Lochner its executive secretary, with Jane Addams continuing to play a leading role in the organization as well. The group issued a publication known as the Emergency Peace Federation Bulletin, and was the organizing force behind a national peace conference held in Chicago from February 27 to 28, 1915.

Throughout 1915 and 1916, a coordinated campaign was conducted in the United States on behalf of military "Preparedness," culminating on July 22, 1916 with Preparedness Day. This campaign for increased military spending in the shadow of the European bloodbath drove American pacifists to action. One of the groups organized in an effort to staunch America's slide to war was the American Union Against Militarism, founded in January 1916 from an "Anti-Preparedness Committee" established the previous year. In early 1917, the American Union Against Militarism were leading advocates for the idea of holding of a national referendum on the question of American entry into the European war, believing that those agitating for foreign intervention were a distinct minority of the population.

A third pacifist organization emerged in February 1917, just as America appeared on the cusp of entering the European conflagration. This New York group, originally called the Emergency Peace Committee, dedicated itself to agitating for a continuation of the policy of American neutrality towards the World War combatants. This group later emerged as the New York Emergency Peace Federation, and worked hand-in-glove with the Chicago organization of the same name.

The Emergency Peace Federation rallied a group of thousands to the United States Capital to oppose American entry into World War I on April 2, 1917. One member, Alexander Bannwart, got into a fistfight with U.S. Senator Henry Cabot Lodge. That day, President Woodrow Wilson delivered a speech to Congress calling for a declaration of war against Germany. As pro-war fervor swept the country, a new phase was entered by activists in the American peace movement — attempting to terminate Wilson's so-called "War to Make the World Safe for Democracy." In keeping with this new task, these three main pacifist organizations of America joined forces in a new organization, ultimately known as the People's Council of America for Democracy and Peace.

=== Establishment ===
On May 2, 1917, more than 40 members of the Emergency Peace Federation assembled at the Hotel Astor in New York City to consider the course for the peace movement in America. Participants were split between radicals and pacifists who favored the peace conditions advanced by the Bolshevik government of Soviet Russia — including Morris Hillquit, Norman Thomas, and Roger Baldwin — and those who favored a more moderate and Americanized approach. When this latter group, headed by Lillian Wald of the American Union Against Militarism, realized that it was in the minority, it walked out of the meeting in order to retain its independence from the forthcoming organization.

Those remaining determined to establish a new peace organization, patterned loosely on the workingmen's councils of Russia. Socialist leader Morris Hillqut was named the ceremonial Chairman of the organizing committee of the new group and Louis P. Lochner was tapped as Secretary, in charge of day-to-day activities.

Lochner's attempt to build a broad-based organization ran into difficulty. Prominent liberals sympathetic to the Wilson administration, such as attorney Frank P. Walsh, refused to associate with the organization. Radicals were more sympathetic, with a number of prominent members of the Socialist Party of America and left-wing members of the American Union Against Militarism joining the new group's ranks, as well as key members of the Emergency Peace Federation, such as rabbi Judah L. Magnes.

A "Tentative Program" was circulated on May 7, in preparation for the gathering. New York City's Madison Square Garden was booked for an organizational mass meeting. Stanford University President David Starr Jordan, a leading public figure among the American peace movement, was sought as a keynote speaker.

Lochner appealed to the American Federation of Labor to also lend its support to the new peace organization. AFL President Samuel Gompers replied angrily in the negative, answering Lochner's cable with a terse declaration that "I prefer not to ally myself with the conscious or unconscious agents of the Kaiser in America."

Despite Gompers' refusal, work on the new organization proceeded apace, with a program committee consisting of Hillquit, Lochner, Norman Thomas, Henry W. L. Dana of Columbia University, and peace activists Rebecca Shelly and Elisabeth Freeman named. The committee decided to endorse a peace proposal calling for peace without annexations or indemnities and the self-determination of all peoples as a basis of its own demands and to cooperate closely with the staunchly anti-militarist Socialist Party.

Leading academics were targeted by Lochner and brought into the new organization's fold during the initial preparatory period, including such worthies as economists Emily Green Balch and Scott Nearing. Lochner envisioned an organization which was nationwide in scope and that would unite local peace organizations from around the United States.

=== First American Conference for Democracy and Terms of Peace ===
At 10 am on May 30, 1917, the Madison Square Garden organizational meeting, called the First American Conference for Democracy and Terms of Peace, was gaveled to order by Judah Magnes. The meeting was held amidst a strong presence by New York City police, who feared violence either by revolutionary participants or nationalist mobs intent on dispersing attendees. Policemen carrying riot guns were posted on street corners surrounding Madison Square Garden, while police vehicles cruised the streets. More than 400 policemen were detailed to the operation.

Delegates began work on a preamble which called upon Americans to "aid our government in bringing to ourselves and the world a speedy, righteous, and lasting peace." Magnes delivered the keynote address, later published as a pamphlet in an edition of 50,000 copies, in which he bitterly attacked Britain and France for pursuing a war which offered little of worth to the working class, and intimating that the United States was engaged in a war to preserve capitalism in Europe.

Also addressing the gathering was Algernon Lee of the Socialist Party-affiliated Rand School of Social Science, who detailed ongoing efforts of the Zimmerwald movement to hold an international peace conference at Stockholm. Lee read a statement written by Morris Hillquit detailing a concrete plan for the participation of the leading belligerents in such a gathering and the establishment of an international body to resolve future economic disagreements amongst the warring parties — proposals which met with strong approval from the assembled delegates.

Afternoon speakers included Professor William I. Hull, a former college student of Woodrow Wilson's, who cautioned the President against making secret agreements with the Entente powers which might in the future commit the United States to participation in future wars. Former Socialist Congressman Victor L. Berger also spoke, bitterly condemning the wartime profiteering of the American ruling class.

An evening session on the labor movement was addressed by James Maurer, a Socialist Party activist who was the elected leader of the AFL in Pennsylvania. Maurer focused his rhetoric upon Samuel Gompers and the national leadership of the AFL, which he charged had sold out the interests of the working class to the interests of the capitalist class. Maurer was followed at the rostrum by Scott Nearing, who emphasized the need of Americans to support an activist labor movement, without which American workers would be suppressed by the combined forces of big business and the government during the war.

On the second day of the conference, sociologist Florence Kelley called on the Wilson administration to improve working conditions of American workers. Numerous speakers followed calling for the repeal of military conscription and an endorsement of the policy of immediate peace without annexations or indemnities.

In the afternoon a formal call was made by Rebecca Shelly for the establishment of a new national organization, the People's Council of America, composed of locals across the country organized through universal suffrage and national referendums. Shelly called for a national convention to be held in the Midwest on September 1, for the establishment of a national office for the fledgling organization, and for the publication of a regular bulletin for national distribution. These proposals were approved by the assembled delegates, and the People's Council of America for Democracy and Peace was formally born.

The People's Council maintained its national headquarters in New York City in an office located at 2 West 13th Street.

=== Repression ===
The People's Council frequently saw its gatherings banned or disbanded. On August 24, 1917, a meeting of the organization in Philadelphia was disrupted and shut down by a mob of soldiers and sailors. That same day, city authorities in Memphis denied the group use of a public hall for its meeting. On August 28, a People's Council gathering in Fargo, North Dakota, was quashed by the coordinated mass singing of "The Star-Spangled Banner."

On August 30, 1917, a mob of 1,000 gathered in Hudson, Wisconsin and held a night rally in front of the armory protesting the attempt by the People's Council to hold a conference in the city's prizefighting arena. The crowd then moved on the four organizers in the lobby of their hotel and threatened to hang them. Only after the pleadings of county attorney N. O. Varnum were the four allowed to leave town at once and unharmed.

Effort was made to hold a national conference in Minneapolis on September 1, but the organization was denied use of a hall in the city. When the alternative of meeting in a circus tent was advanced, With less than a week remaining before the start of its scheduled national convention, Minnesota Governor Joseph Burquist of Minnesota intervened to ban the People's Council from gathering anywhere in the state on the grounds that it would give aid and comfort to the enemies of the United States.

The People's Council scrambled and attempted to hold its convention in Chicago, but the event was broken up by the police. When Chicago Mayor "Big Bill" Thompson attempted to reverse this action, on the grounds that "pacifists are law-abiding citizens" and that he would not "have it spread broadcast that Chicago denies free speech to anyone," Illinois Governor Frank Lowden responded by mobilizing the Illinois National Guard, sending four companies of troops to Chicago the next day to make sure that the People's Council could not gather.

The People's Council sought to make Stanford University President David Starr Jordan its delegate to a proposed September 9, 1917, peace meeting in Stockholm, but political pressure seems to have forced Jordan to decline the appointment and sever all relations with the organization as its treasurer effective September 1 of that year.

=== Publications ===
Beginning August 7, 1917, the People's Council published a tabloid-sized monthly (later semi-monthly) newspaper called The Bulletin of the People's Council of America. The publication was terminated effective with the issue of January 1919. A run of the publication exists on microfilm as reel 2 of the Swarthmore College Peace Collection's People's Council of America papers.

The organization also issued a plethora of pamphlets, including material written by Max Eastman, Judah Magnes, Scott Nearing, and Alexander Trachtenberg.

=== Dissolution and legacy ===
The People's Council was succeeded in the post-war period by the People's Freedom Union, which operated from the same New York headquarters and carried forward the People's Council's publishing imprint, "The People's Print." This new incarnation of the People's Council dedicated itself to the fight to free political prisoners, to stop the spread of militarism, and to halt military intervention in Mexico and Soviet Russia.

An archive of papers relating to the People's Council of America may be found at Swarthmore College in Pennsylvania. The bulk of the collection has been filmed on two reels of microfilm, both of which are available through inter-library loan.

Papers related to the People's Council of America as well as the American Alliance for Labor and Democracy may be found in the Frank Leslie Grubbs collection, housed at the Hoover Institution archives at Stanford University in Palo Alto, California. The collection includes one folder of material and ten reels of microfilm gathering correspondence, minutes, and printed publications.

== See also ==
- American Alliance for Labor and Democracy
- People's Freedom Union
- List of anti-war organizations
- List of peace activists

== Publications ==
- Report of the First American Conference for Democracy and Terms of Peace, Held at Madison Square Garden, New York City, May 30th and 31st, 1917. New York: Organizing Committee, People's Council of American for Democracy and Peace, n.d. [1917].
- The People's Council for Democracy and Peace. New York: People's Council for Democracy and Peace, 1917.
- British Labor Demands: A People's Peace... New York: People's Council of America, 1917.
- The Case Against Universal Military Training. New York: People's Council, 1917.
- Democracy and Peace: Why the World is at War and What Must Come Out of the Struggle. New York: People's Council of America, 1918.
- Patriotism by Patriots: For the Heroes of 1917. Los Angeles: Southern California Organizing Committee of the People's Council of America for Democracy and Peace, n.d [1917].
- Peace Terms of Belligerent Governments. Committee on Terms of Peace of the People's Council of America, n.d. [1917].
- People of America, Unite for Peace. New York: People's Council of America for Democracy and Peace, n.d. [1917].
- People's Peace Terms. New York: Committee on Terms of Peace of the People's Council of America, n.d. [1917].
- Secret Diplomacy and Profiteering: Hidden Treaties Published by Bolsheviki... New York: People's Council of America, 1918.
- Three Things You Should Do! New York: People's Council of America for Democracy and Peace, n.d. [1917].
- Who are the Bolsheviki? The Truth about the New Government of Russia. Chicago: Chicago People's Council, n.d. [c. 1918].
- Max Eastman, Washington to Petrograd — Via Rome: Some Observations on President Wilson's Reply to Pope Benedict XV. New York: People's Council of America, 1917.
- Judah Leon Magnes, For Democracy and Terms of Peace: Address at Opening of First American Conference for Democracy and Terms of Peace, New York City, May 30–31, 1917. New York: People's Council, 1917.
- Judah Leon Magnes, Let the Peace Conference Convene. Chicago: People's Council of America, 1917.
- William E. Mason; James H Maurer; and John D. Works, Things We Care About. New York: People's Council of America for Democracy and Peace, 1917.
- Basil Maxwell Manly, War: Who Gets the Profits? What are You Going to Do about It? New York: People's Council of America, 1917.
- Scott Nearing, Open Letters to Profiteers: An Arraignment of Big Business in its Relation to the World War. New York: People's Council of America, 1917.
- Theodore Schroeder, The Meaning of Free Speech for Pacifists: A Statement. New York: People's Council of America for Democracy and Peace, n.d. [c. 1917].
- Alexander Trachtenberg, The Message of New Russia: The Answer Given by the Largest Nation in Western Civilization to the Question: What Shall We Do with Plutocracy at Home and Abroad? Excerpts from an Article. New York: People's Council of America, n.d. [1918].
- John D. Works and Morris Hillquit, Why We Are at War. Milwaukee: People's Council of Milwaukee, 1917.
