= Jeff Fuller =

Jeffrey or Jeff Fuller may refer to:

== People ==
- Jeff Fuller (racing driver) (born 1957), NASCAR driver
- Jeff Fuller (safety) (born 1962), former American football safety for the San Francisco 49ers, 1984–1989
- Jeff Fuller (wide receiver) (born 1990), his son, American football wide receiver
- Jeffrey Fuller, ACLU Membership Director, 1948–1959
- Jeff Fuller, bass player in the Lou Donaldson quartet

== Other ==
- Jeffrey Fuller series, a novel series written by Joe Buff
