= Elizabeth Beardsley Butler =

American social investigator (1884–1911)

- Butler, from a 1911 publication
- Born: December 1, 1884; New York, New York, U.S.
- Died: August 2, 1911 (aged 26); Saranac Lake, New York, U.S.
- Occupation: researcher

Elizabeth Beardsley Butler (December 1, 1884 – August 2, 1911) was a pioneering social investigator of the Progressive Era. She studied the lives of women and children wage earners in Jersey City, New Jersey, Pittsburgh, and Baltimore. She is best known for her contributions to The Pittsburgh Survey, a landmark study of social conditions in an American city.

== Early life and education ==
Butler was born in New York in 1884, the daughter of Frederick Butler and Emmie Beardsley Butler. Her father was a businessman, born in Ireland. She graduated from Packer Collegiate Institute in 1903, and from Barnard College in 1905.

== Career ==
After college, Butler was executive secretary of the Consumers League of New Jersey, and secretary of the New Jersey Child Labor Committee. Beginning in 1907 Butler worked for Paul Kellogg's Pittsburgh Survey, funded by the Russell Sage Foundation. Her resulting book, Women and the Trades, was published in 1909. It was the first large survey of wage-earning women in America and the first of the six volumes of The Survey. In her last months, Butler was on the staff of the Bureau of Social Research at the New York School of Philanthropy.

== Publications ==
- Women and the Trades Pittsburgh, 1907–1908 (1909)
- "Child Labor in Pittsburgh" (1909)
- "Social Life of Working Women" (1910)
- "Training Store Girls in Salesmanship" (1912, published posthumously)
- Saleswomen in Mercantile Stores: Baltimore, 1909 (1912, published posthumously)
- "Sharpsburg: A Typical Waste of Childhood" (1916, published posthumously)

== Death ==
Butler died of tuberculosis at age 26 in Saranac Lake, New York. "American women of this generation and American workers generally have lost an interpreter of rare gifts in Elizabeth Beardsley Butler," Paul Kellogg wrote in The Survey, remarking on her "marvelous fund of buoyant energy" and "her splendid courage". Her mother established a scholarship in her memory at the New York School of Philanthropy.
