= John A. Fitch =

American economist (1881–1959)

The Steel Workers, Fitch's best known book

John Andrews Fitch (April 20, 1881 in Cumberland, Wisconsin –1959) was an American writer, teacher, and pioneering social investigator of the Progressive Era. He is best known for his contributions to The Pittsburgh Survey, a landmark study of social conditions in an archetypal U.S. industrial city.

Born in South Dakota, he was a 1904 graduate of Yankton College. He taught at Nebraska's Weeping Water Academy before enrolling at the University of Wisconsin–Madison for graduate studies in political economy.

In the fall of 1907 he joined with his professor, John R. Commons, on a trip to Pittsburgh, Pennsylvania to begin work with dozens of other progressives on an ambitious sociological study: Paul Kellogg's Pittsburgh Survey, funded by the Russell Sage Foundation. Fitch spent more than a year interviewing steel workers. The resulting book, The Steel Workers, was published in 1910, one of the Survey's six published volumes. It remains a classic depiction of a key industry in early twentieth-century America.

Fitch, after a brief stint working for the New York Department of Labor, was an editor and writer for Paul Kellogg's Survey, America's leading social work journal. Beginning in 1917 Fitch taught labor relations as a professor at the New York School of Social Work, where he retired in 1946.
