= Japan Civil Liberties Union =

Japanese non-profit organization

- （公益財団法）人自由人権協会; Jiyū Jinken Kyōkai
- Abbreviation: JCLU
- Formation: 1947; 79 years ago
- Founders: Roger Baldwin; Shinkichi Uno; Chusaburo Arima
- Type: Incorporated foundation
- Purpose: Civil liberties advocacy
- Headquarters: Minato, Tokyo, Japan
- Region served: Japan
- Members: About 450 (2018)
- Secretary-General: Yoichi Kitamura
- Affiliations: American Civil Liberties Union; International League for Human Rights; International Commission of Jurists
- Website: jclu.org/english/

The Japan Civil Liberties Union (JCLU) (自由人権協会, Jiyū Jinken Kyōkai) is a Japanese non-profit organization founded in 1947. Roger Nash Baldwin of the ACLU played an important role in its founding. The JCLU aims to protect human rights, and bases its operation on international human rights standards, principally the Universal Declaration of Human Rights. It is affiliated with the International Commission of Jurists (ICJ) and the International League for Human Rights (ILHR).
