= Freda Kirchwey =

American journalist, editor, and publisher (1893–1976)

- Born: Mary Frederika Kirchwey; September 26, 1893; Lake Placid, New York
- Died: January 3, 1976 (aged 82)
- Education: Barnard College
- Occupation: Journalist
- Spouse: Evans Clark

Mary Frederika "Freda" Kirchwey (September 26, 1893 – January 3, 1976) was an American journalist, editor, and publisher strongly committed throughout her career to liberal causes (anti-Fascist, pro-Soviet, anti-anti-communist). From 1933 to 1955, she was editor of The Nation magazine.

== Background ==
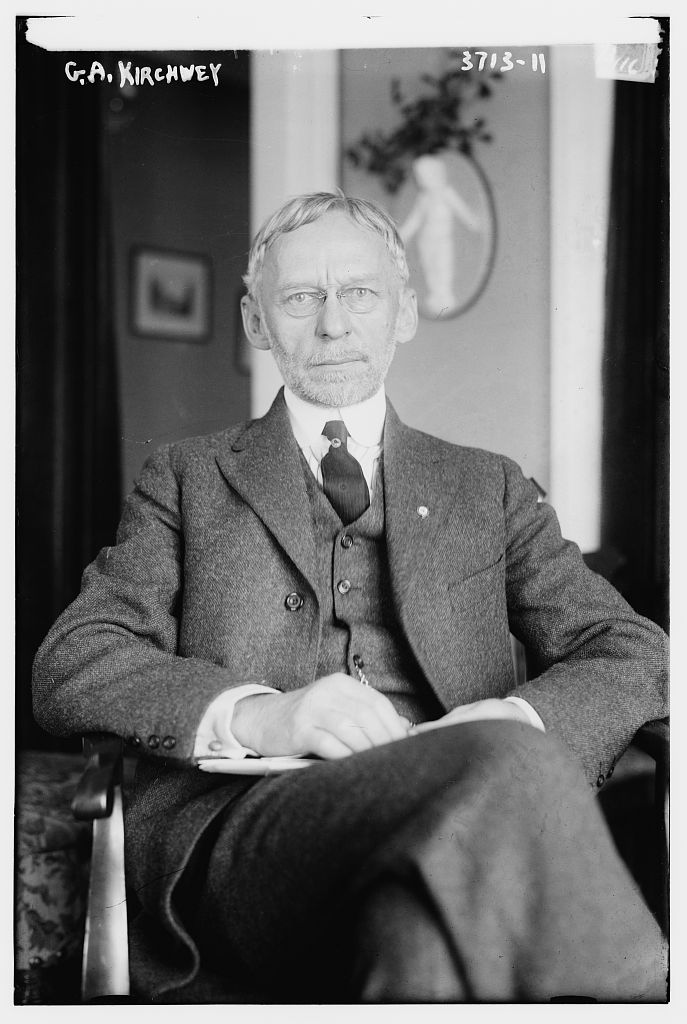
George W. Kirchwey was Kirchwey's father.

Born in Lake Placid, New York, in 1893 as the Progressive Era was getting under way, Kirchwey was the daughter of pacifist Columbia Law Professor George W. Kirchwey. She attended Barnard College from 1911 to 1915.

== Career ==
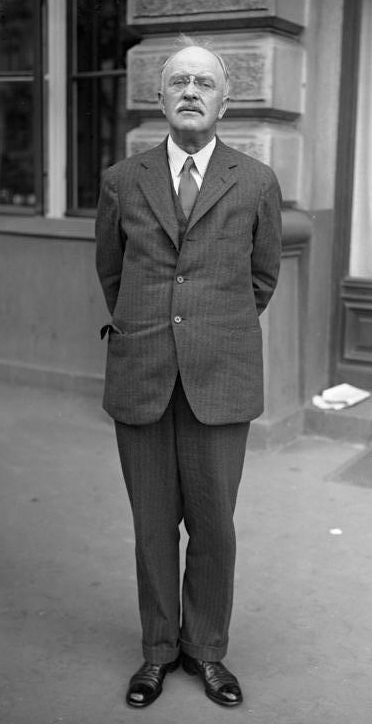
Oswald Garrison Villard (1930) was editor of The Nation before Kirchwey.

Kirchwey began working locally in journalism after graduation, at the New York Morning Telegraph, Every Week magazine, and the New York Tribune.

In 1918, she was brought to The Nation by then editor Oswald Garrison Villard, largely at the behest of Kirchwey's former professor at Barnard, Henry Raymond Mussey, first working in the International Relations Section. In 1922 she became managing editor. In 1925 Kirchwey, an active feminist, published Our Changing Morality, a collection of articles dealing primarily with changing sexual relations. In 1926 she launched These Modern Women, a set of essays portraying successful feminist lives, including work by Crystal Eastman. Kirchwey also wrote articles in The Nation about early feminists Susan B. Anthony and Alice Paul. She succeeded Villard as editor of the magazine in 1933, first as part of a four-person committee, then as the sole editor, becoming the first woman at the top of the masthead of a national weekly newsmagazine. In 1937, she bought the magazine from Maurice Wertheim, who had purchased it from Villard in a brief and particularly contentious period of the magazine's history.

As editor, Kirchwey was strongly supportive of Roosevelt's New Deal and later broke with Villard in her support of Roosevelt's involvement in World War II. She was strongly supportive of the anti-Franco faction during the Spanish Civil War and supported the creation of an independent Jewish state. Her opposition to fascism led to a strong belief in the value of strong ties to the Soviet Union, opposing fascism in general and Nazism more specifically. Kirchwey criticized the Soviet invasion of Finland, stating "The horrors that fascism wreaked in Spain, are being repeated, in the name of peace and socialism, in Finland". On the domestic front, she was a sharp critic of the House Un-American Activities Committee — calling Martin Dies Jr., its leader from 1938 to 1944, a "one-man Gestapo from Texas" — and the growth of McCarthyism in America. In 1944, some 1,300 people, including President Roosevelt and Albert Einstein, attended a testimonial dinner honoring Kirchwey's 25 years at The Nation. Another attendee was journalist Dorothy Thompson, who in a speech praised Kirchwey for having the courage "to throw light into dark places and to defend the people versus those interests that in our society have repeatedly striven to defeat the full realization of the promise of democracy." At the end of World War II, Kirchwey called on the United States and the Soviet Union to work together in international affairs, and argued that the certainty of nuclear proliferation meant the great powers must pool their sovereignty in a world government ("We face a choice between one world or none.") Louis Fischer resigned from the magazine afterwards, claiming Kirchwey's foreign coverage was too pro-Soviet. As a result of this evolution in the magazine's politics, both The Nation and its editor were criticized strongly, and some readers canceled their subscriptions, claiming The Nation was "pro-Communist". This criticism was repeated even at times by members of the American left; Arthur Schlesinger, Jr. famously referred to the magazine's "wretched apologies for Soviet despotism." The magazine's political marginalization, however, also had financial consequences, becoming a significant financial drain by the early 1940s. As a result, Kirchwey sold her individual ownership of the magazine in 1943, creating a nonprofit organization, Nation Associates, formed out of the money generated from a recruiting drive of sponsors. Nation Associates ran the magazine and also conducted research and organized conferences. In 1951, Kirchwey brought Carey McWilliams to work for The Nation.

Kirchwey, as president of Nation Associates, remained editor of the paper until 1955, when McWilliams became editor and George Kirstein became publisher.

After 1955, Kirchwey became involved with a collection of civil rights and pacifist organizations, including the Committee for a Democratic Spain, Women's International League for Peace and Freedom, Committee for World Development and World Disarmament, the League of Women Voters, and the National Association for the Advancement of Colored People.

== Personal life ==
In November 1915, Kirchwey married Evans Clark, then a Princeton University professor who later worked for The New York Times. They had three sons, only one of whom survived to adulthood.

== Death ==
She died on January 3, 1976, in St. Petersburg, Florida.

== Works ==
- The Atomic Era: Can it Bring Peace and Abundance! (New York: McBride, 1950).
- One World or None, The Nation, August 18, 1945.
- Our Changing Morality: A Symposium (New York: A. & C. Boni, 1924).
- When H.G. Wells Split the Atom: A 1914 Preview of 1945, The Nation, August 18, 1945.

== See also ==
- Lillie Shultz
