= Tsar to Lenin =

- 2012 Mehring Books DVD cover
- Directed by: Herman Axelbank
- Written by: Max Eastman
- Produced by: Herman Axelbank
- Starring: Max Eastman
- Edited by: Max Eastman
- Distributed by: Lenauer International Films
- Release date: March 6, 1937
- Running time: 63 minutes
- Country: United States
- Language: English

Tsar to Lenin is a documentary and cinematic record of the Russian Revolution, produced by Herman Axelbank. It premiered on March 6, 1937, at the Filmarte Theatre on Fifty-Eighth Street in New York City. Pioneer American radical Max Eastman (1883-1969) narrates the film. Because of its pro-Trotskyist position, the film was suppressed by the Stalinists of the American Communist Party and was only widely available in a shortened format in the Library of Congress until its re-release in 2012 by the Socialist Equality Party (US), who state that its predecessor, the Workers League, purchased the film from Axelbank in 1978 and organized showings of the film in the intervening period.

== Cast ==
- Alexander Kerensky
- Vladimir Lenin
- Leon Trotsky
- Nicholas II

== Production ==
The footage was collected by Herman Axelbank, starting in 1920. The scenes of the film were gathered from more than 100 different cameras over the course of the next thirteen years. Those behind the camera include the Tsar's royal photographer, the Tsar himself, Soviet photographers, military staff photographers of Germany, Great Britain, Japan and the United States, and others.

The narration is provided by the American radical Max Eastman, who was originally slated to write captions to explain the scenes and help raise money to finance the project. Eastman was chosen by Axelbank because of Eastman's close political relations with many leaders of the Bolshevik party, chiefly with Leon Trotsky. He also was among the first to provide an account of the political struggle between Trotsky and Joseph Stalin to the international arena.

Eastman also provided Axelbank with additional footage, which included the Tsar swimming with his courtiers, nude. Eastman's narration for this sequence is, "This is the first time the world has seen a king as he really is!”

The film premiered at the Filmarte Theater in New York City on March 6, 1937.

== Controversy ==
The New York Post gave a favorable review of the film, where they said it was done "extremely well".

Supporters of Stalin in the US denounced the film. The documentary, which appeared at the height of the Moscow Trials, showed the chief defendant, Trotsky, in an extremely favorable light.

Eastman said at the time,

"Trotsky had led the October insurrection and organized the Red army—the films said so—but Stalin was now in total power. Tsar to Lenin never got the distance of a few dollars beyond the Filmarte Theatre."

Five days after the outpouring of praise, a big-headlined article appeared in the Daily Worker, the daily newspaper of the Communist Party, came out decrying Eastman. It said,

"Max Eastman, chief apologist for the Trotsky band of traitors to the Soviet Socialist land, has assembled news-reels and documentary clips. This man is an expert in distortion, chicanery, trickery, innuendo, and outright lies … Tzar to Lenin must be boycotted … Protest to the management of the Filmarte Theatre … Make it clear to other theatres that Tzar to Lenin is unadulterated Trotskyist propaganda, and as such cannot be tolerated by the friends of freedom. …Boycott Tzar to Lenin!”

The Filmarte Theater, and others, were then told that they would not be allowed to show other films such as Sergei Eisenstein's October: Ten Days That Shook the World, effectively ending the first run of Tsar to Lenin.
