= Annis Bertha Ford Eastman =

American Congregational minister (1852–1910)

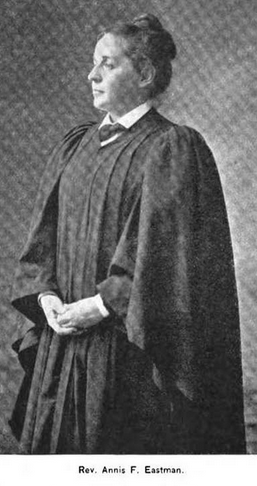
- Eastman, from an 1897 magazine
- Born: April 24, 1852; Peoria, Illinois, US
- Died: 1910 (aged 57–58)
- Children: Crystal Eastman, Max Eastman

Annis Bertha Ford Eastman (1852–1910) was an American Congregational minister, and one of the first non-Quaker women in the United States to be ordained. She ministered at several churches in New York State, including Park Church in Elmira. She was a popular speaker, as well. In 1893, she spoke at the Congress of Women, held at the World's Columbian Exposition in Chicago. She presented at the National Council of Women of the United States in 1895.

== Early life and marriage ==
Annis Bertha Ford was born on April 24, 1852, in Peoria, Illinois. Her father, George W. Ford, was a gunsmith. Her mother, Catherine, née Stehley, stayed at home to raise her children. Ford attended Oberlin College, and graduated with a certificate in teaching in 1874. She met Samuel Elijah Eastman at Oberlin, where he was studying to be a clergyman, and they married in 1875. They had four children: Morgan Eastman (who died as a young child of scarlet fever), Anstice Ford Eastman, Crystal Eastman, and Max Eastman.

In the early years of her marriage, Eastman and her family moved to various locations where her husband was serving as minister. These included: Swampscott, Massachusetts; Newport, Kentucky; and Canandaigua, New York. By 1886, his health had deteriorated, and Eastman began teaching school to help make ends meet.

== Ordained ministry ==
In 1887, Eastman began serving as a licensed preacher at the Congregational Church in Brookton, New York. She was ordained in 1889, making her one of only a handful of women who had received ordination in the United States at this point in time. Antoinette Brown Blackwell, Olympia Brown, and Anna Howard Shaw were her contemporaries, all ordained in the late 1800s.

She became the assistant pastor, with her husband, of Park Church in Elmira, New York. The senior minister at Park Church was Rev. Thomas K. Beecher, the son of Lyman Beecher, and brother to Henry Ward Beecher and Harriet Beecher Stowe. After Rev. Beecher's death in 1900, Rev. Eastman and her husband became co-pastors of Park Church. Beecher is said to have declared that she was the best female preacher he had heard.

While living in Elmira, she befriended Mark Twain, and the Eastmans became close friends to Twain and his wife, Livy. Annis Eastman was asked to offer the eulogy at Twain's funeral; she wrote it, but ill health prevented her from delivering it; her husband spoke on her behalf.

Eastman was a popular preacher and speaker, and an activist for women's rights and suffrage. She was invited to speak at the Congress of Women, at the World's Columbian Exposition in Chicago in 1893. Her talk was entitled "The Home and Its Foundations." She gave a sermon at a session of the National Council of Women in the United States, in 1895.

Late in her career, she became more liberal in her religious views, and became a Unitarian.

She died in 1910. Her children Max and Crystal, were influenced by her ideas and her ministry, and went on to be well known suffragists and social reformers.
