= The Immortal Gentleman =

- Trade Show advertisement (Kine Weekly, 21 March 1935)
- Directed by: Widgey R. Newman
- Written by: William Shakespeare (plays); John Quin; Widgey R. Newman
- Produced by: Bernard Smith
- Starring: Basil Gill; Rosalinde Fuller; Dennis Hoey
- Music by: John Reynders
- Production company: Bernard Smith Productions
- Distributed by: Equity British Films
- Release date: March 1935
- Running time: 61 minutes
- Country: United Kingdom
- Language: English

The Immortal Gentleman is a 1935 British historical drama film directed by Widgey R. Newman and starring Basil Gill, Rosalinde Fuller and Dennis Hoey. It was written by John Quin and Newman based on the plays of William Shakespeare, and was made as a quota quickie.

== Synopsis ==
In the early seventeenth century William Shakespeare, Ben Jonson and Michael Drayton meet in a Southwark tavern and begin discussing the other customers who remind them of characters from Shakespeare's plays.

== Cast ==
- Basil Gill as William Shakespeare / Malvolio
- Rosalinde Fuller as Ophelia / Juliet / Lady
- Dennis Hoey as Soldier / Toby Belch
- Anne Bolt as Jane / Maria
- Edgar Owen as Ben Jonson / Mercutio
- Hubert Leslie as Michael Drayton
- Laidman Browne as Gambler / Petruchio / Feste
- Terence de Marney as Harry Morton / Hamlet / Romeo
- Derrick De Marney as James Carter / Tybalt
- Fred Rains as Miser
- Dennis Wyndham as Voyager
- Ivan Berlyn as Father / Aguecheek
- Leo Genn as Merchant / Shylock
- Roy Byford as Squire
- Noel Birkin
- Peggy Bolton
- Bertram Dench

== Reception ==
Kine Weekly wrote: "Episodic costume piece which provides serviceable, if not too subtle, formula tor screen presentation of more popular Shakespearean excerpts by introducing the Bard as a tavern philosopher. Types encountered in the inn furnish great Tudor scenarist with opportunity to recall scenes and characters in his plays, which are duly cut in. Suitable booking for exhibitors who think their patrons would like to see screen cameo versions of the Hamlet soliloquy and other gems from the Shakespearean treasury."

The Daily Film Renter wrote: "Effort to popularise Shakespeare, produced on economical lines against Elizabethan tavern background, with scenes from plays. Lack of variation in settings, which are confined to mere suggestion of scenes. ... Paucity of pictorial appeal and lack of coherent story limit box-office value if there is any in Shakespeare for kinema audiences. ... doubtful entertainment."

The Bystander wrote: "This curious pictorial anthology is mighty dull, and will scarcely convert non-Shakespeareans nor satisfy his ' fans.' ... Both matter and manner are dull and lacking in filmic quality.
