= The Unwritten Law (1929 film) =

1929 film

- Directed by: Sinclair Hill
- Written by: Violet Heckstall-Smith
- Starring: Rosalinde Fuller; Ian Swinley
- Cinematography: Arpad Viragh
- Production company: British Sound Film Productions
- Distributed by: British Independent Exhibitors' Distributors
- Release date: June 1929
- Running time: 29 minutes
- Country: United Kingdom
- Language: English

The Unwritten Law is a 1929 British short crime film directed by Sinclair Hill, and made at Wembley Studios in the De Forest Phonofilm sound-on-film system.

== Cast ==
- Rosalinde Fuller as The Wife
- Ion Swinley as The Sweetheart
- Robert Bruce as Policeman
- Edwin M. Robson as Villager
- Pat Williams as Villager

== Bibliography ==
- Low, Rachael, History of the British Film, 1918-1929 (George Allen & Unwin, 1971)
