= Walter Fuller (editor) =

English editor (1881–1927)

- Born: Walter Gladstone Fuller
- Occupations: Writer, editor
- Known for: Anti-war activist, editor of the Radio Times
- Spouse: Crystal Eastman
- Children: Jeffrey Fuller and Annis Fuller
- Relatives: Rosalinde Fuller (sister)

Walter Gladstone Fuller (1881–1927) was an English editor who managed his sisters' singing of folksongs, created anti-war propaganda during the First World War and then worked in New York on The Freeman (208 numbers between March 1920 and March 1924). He was largely responsible for its antiquated layout and use of English spelling; then he became the first BBC employee to edit the Radio Times.

== Early life ==
Walter Fuller was born in 1881 to Walter Henry and Elizabeth Fuller.

After studying medicine at Owen's College, Manchester, and failing to get his degree in 1904, Fuller edited the University Review, Comradeship (for the Co-operative Holidays Association and the National Home Reading Union), and the Reader's Review (for the Library Association and National Home Reading Union). By 1910, they were all either defunct or on the brink of closure.

== Managing The Fuller Sisters ==
Fuller had one older sister, Oriska Violet (Fuller) Ward, and three younger ones; Rosalind Ivy Fuller, Cynthia Rose (Fuller) Dehn, and Dorothy Daisy (Fuller) Odell. He was very close to them all. The eldest, Oriska, had studied the harp (plus the piano and singing) at the Royal College of Music; the younger ones were largely home-schooled. After their singing of folksongs was noticed—and highly praised by Cecil Sharp – the three eldest girls decided to chance their luck as folksingers in America, with Oriska accompanying them and Walter as their manager. Such was their success that within six months they were invited to sing at the White House, but their schedule was already too full to fit that in before they left for home. On subsequent tours, they sang twice for President Wilson, once at the White House and once at his summer residence, Shadowlawn. By 1917, "The Fuller Sisters" were famous, recognized and stopped in the streets for their signatures. Then the entry of the US into the First World War put an end to the demand for folksongs.

== Activism and career as an editor ==
By this time, Fuller had become a peace activist, married the renowned American socialist activist Crystal Eastman, and was masterminding the anti-war propaganda campaign of the New York branch of the Woman's Peace Party. He conceived and mounted a pioneering "War Against War" exhibition (commemorated in a 2017 exhibition), ideas for which were used by the Creel Committee to serve the opposite purpose of making America want to go to war. He worked closely with Norman Thomas to edit The World Tomorrow, and brought the concept of civil liberties to the Civil Liberties Bureau, out of which grew the American Civil Liberties Union. After working on The Freeman in New York, he returned to England, was recruited by the newly formed BBC and became the first BBC employee to edit Radio Times. He died in September 1927 of high blood pressure, caused by overwork. His wife, Crystal Eastman, died eight months later. They left two small children, Jeffrey Fuller and Anice Fuller. (It was at this time that his sister Rosalind moved to England to develop the acting career she had been pursuing in the US.)
