= Crystal Eastman =

American lawyer, activist, feminist, and journalist (1881–1928)

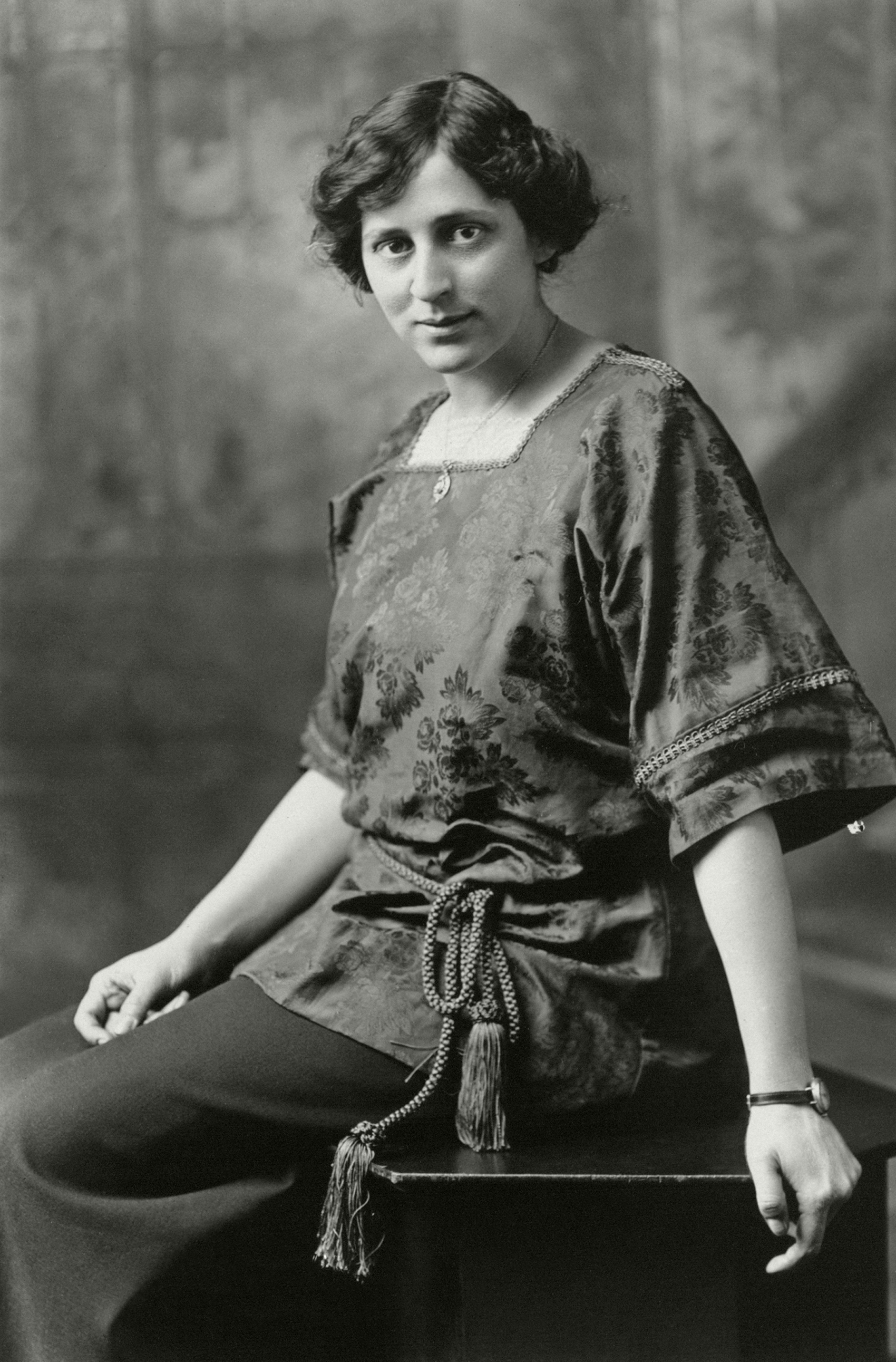
- Eastman c. 1914
- Born: Crystal Catherine Eastman; June 25, 1881; Marlborough, Massachusetts, U.S.
- Died: July 8, 1928 (aged 47); Erie, Pennsylvania, U.S.
- Occupation: Lawyer
- Known for: Feminism, socialism, Congressional Union for Woman Suffrage, The Liberator, and as a co-founder of both the Women's International League for Peace and Freedom and American Union Against Militarism
- Spouses: Wallace Benedict; Walter Fuller
- Children: Jeffrey Fuller; Annis Fuller
- Parent(s): Samuel Elijah Eastman; Annis Bertha Ford
- Relatives: Max Eastman (brother)

Crystal Catherine Eastman (June 25, 1881 – July 28, 1928) was an American lawyer, antimilitarist, feminist, socialist, and journalist. She was a leader in the fight for women's suffrage, a co-founder and co-editor with her brother Max Eastman of the radical arts and politics magazine The Liberator, co-founder of the Women's International League for Peace and Freedom, and co-founder in 1920 of the American Civil Liberties Union. In 2000, she was inducted into the National Women's Hall of Fame in Seneca Falls, New York.

== Early life and education ==
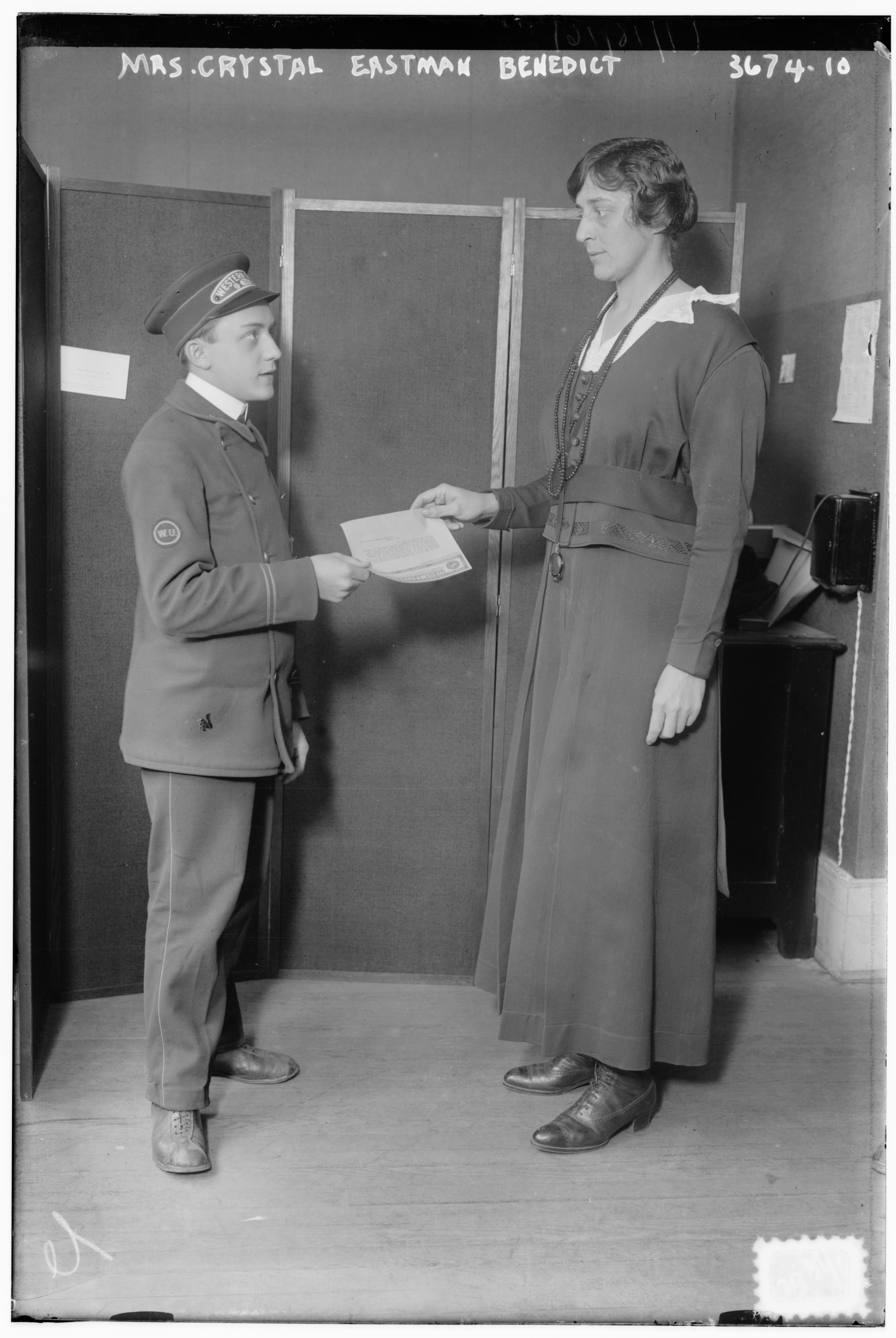
Crystal Catherine Eastman in 1915.

Crystal Eastman was born in Marlborough, Massachusetts, on June 25, 1881, the third of four children. Her oldest brother, Morgan, was born in 1878 and died in 1884. The second brother, Anstice Ford Eastman, who became a general surgeon, was born in 1878 and died in 1937. Max was the youngest, born in 1883.

In 1883, their parents, Samuel Elijah Eastman and Annis Bertha Ford, moved the family to Canandaigua, New York. In 1889, their mother became one of the first women ordained as a Protestant minister in America when she became a minister of the Congregational church. Her father was also a Congregational minister, and the two served as pastors at the church of Thomas K. Beecher near Elmira. Mark Twain's family also attended the church and it was this shared association that young Crystal also became acquainted with him.

This part of New York was in the so-called "Burnt Over District." During the Second Great Awakening earlier in the 19th century, its frontier had been a center of evangelizing and much religious excitement, which resulted in the founding of such beliefs as Millerism and Mormonism. During the antebellum period, some were inspired by religious ideals to support such progressive social causes as abolitionism and the Underground Railroad.

This humanitarian tradition influenced Crystal and her brother Max Eastman. He became a socialist activist early on, and Crystal had several common causes with him. They were close throughout her life, even after he had become more conservative.

The siblings lived together on 11th Street in New York City's Greenwich Village among other radical activists for several years. The group, including Ida Rauh, Inez Milholland, Floyd Dell, and Doris Stevens, also spent summers and weekends in Croton-on-Hudson, where Max bought a house in 1916.

Eastman graduated from Vassar College in 1903 and received a Master of Arts degree in sociology (then a relatively new field) from Columbia University in 1904. She then attended New York University Law School, graduating in 1907 as the second in her class. While pursuing her graduate degree, Eastman worked nights as a recreation leader at the Greenwich House Settlement, where she encountered Paul Underwood Kellogg.

== Social efforts ==
Social work pioneer and journal editor Paul Kellogg offered Eastman her first job: investigating labor conditions for The Pittsburgh Survey. Her report, Work Accidents and the Law (1910), became a crucial tool in the fight for occupation health and safety and an early weapon in the ongoing battle. In 1909, Justice Hughes, who at the time was governor of New York, appointed Eastman to the New York State Commission of Employee's Liability and Causes of Industrial Accidents, Unemployment and Lack of Farm Labor. The first woman to be appointed a commission member, she drafted the inaugural workers' compensation law. This model became the standard for the U.S. During Woodrow Wilson's presidency, she continued to campaign for occupational safety and health while working as an investigating attorney for the U.S. Commission on Industrial Relations from 1913 to 1914. She advocated for "motherhood endowments" whereby mothers of young children would receive monetary benefits. She argued it would reduce forced dependence of mothers on men, as well as economically empower women.

== Emancipation ==
Wallace J. Benedict was an insurance agent in Milwaukee, Wisconsin, and so when Eastman married him in 1911, she moved there after the wedding. There she managed the unsuccessful 1912 Wisconsin suffrage campaign.

Divorcing in 1913, she returned east where she joined Alice Paul, Lucy Burns, and others in founding the militant Congressional Union for Woman Suffrage, which became the National Woman's Party. After the passage of the 19th Amendment gave women the right to vote in 1920, Eastman and Paul wrote the Equal Rights Amendment (ERA), first introduced in 1923. One of the few socialists to endorse the ERA, Eastman warned that protective legislation for women would mean only discrimination against women. Eastman claimed that one could assess the importance of the ERA by the intensity of the opposition to it. However, she felt that it was still a struggle worth fighting. She also delivered the speech "Now We Can Begin" after the ratification of the Nineteenth Amendment;it outlined the work that needed to be done in the political and economic spheres to achieve sex or gender equality.

== Peace efforts ==
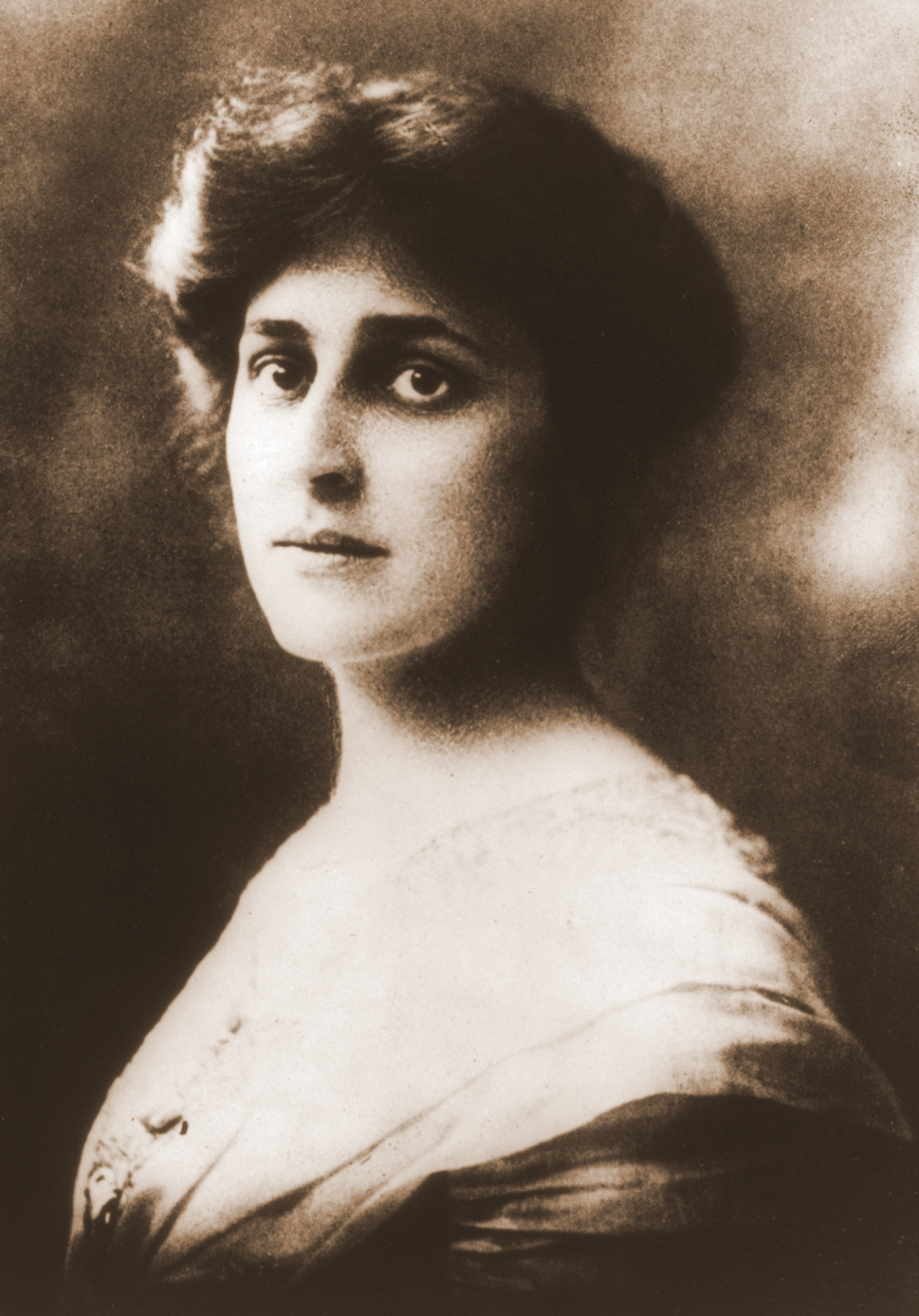
Crystal Eastman was a noted anti-militarist, who helped found the Women's International League for Peace and Freedom.

During World War I, Eastman was one of the founders of the Woman's Peace Party, soon joined by Jane Addams, Lillian D. Wald, and others. She served as president of the New York City branch. Renamed the Women's International League for Peace and Freedom in 1921, it remains the oldest extant women's peace organization. Eastman also became executive director of the American Union Against Militarism, which lobbied against America's entrance into the European war and more successfully against war with Mexico in 1916. This group sought to remove profiteering from arms manufacturing and campaigned against conscription, imperial adventures, and military intervention.

When the United States entered World War I, Eastman, together with Roger Baldwin and Norman Thomas organized the National Civil Liberties Bureau (NCLB) to protect conscientious objectors or, in her words: "To maintain something over here that will be worth coming back to when the weary war is over." The NCLB grew into the American Civil Liberties Union (ACLU), with Baldwin at the head and Eastman functioning as attorney-in-charge. Eastman is credited as a founding member of the ACLU, but her role as founder of the NCLB may have been largely ignored by posterity because of her personal differences with Baldwin.

== Marriage and family ==
In 1916, Eastman married the British editor and antiwar activist Walter Fuller, who had come to the United States to direct his sisters' singing of folksongs. They had two children, Jeffrey Fuller born in 1917 and Annis Fuller born in 1921. Choosing to keep her last name, Eastman explored family practices aimed at fostering gender equality within the realms of marriage and family life. The publication of her 1923 confessional article titled Marriage Under Two Roofs caused an uproar as Eastman revealed the specifics of their unconventional living arrangement. She argues that residing in two separate residences is better than in one because by ultimately leading to an authentic expression of sexual desire and marital love, which in turn contributes to the overall happiness of the family unit. Eastman and Walter worked together as activists until the end of the war, when he worked as the managing editor of The Freeman until 1922, when he returned to London, England. For eight years, Eastman traveled by ship between London and New York to be with her husband. Walter died in 1927 from a stroke, which ended his career of editing Radio Times for the BBC.

After Max Eastman's periodical The Masses was forced to close by government censorship in 1917, he and Crystal co-founded a radical journal of politics, art, and literature: the Liberator, in early 1918. She and Max co-edited it until they put it in the hands of faithful friends in 1922.

=== Post-War ===
After the war, Eastman organized the First Feminist Congress in 1919. In New York, her activities led to her being blacklisted during the Red Scare of 1919–1920. During the 1920s, Eastman was a columnist for Alice Paul's feminist journal, Equal Rights, and the British feminist weekly publication Time and Tide. Eastman claimed that "life was a big battle for the complete feminist," but she was convinced that the complete feminist would someday achieve total victory.

=== Death ===
Crystal Eastman died at age 47, on July 8, 1928, of nephritis, a year after her husband had passed. Friends were entrusted with their two orphaned children, then seven and eleven years old, to rear them until adulthood.

== Legacy ==
Eastman has been called one of the most neglected leaders in the United States because although she wrote pioneering legislation and created long-lasting political organizations, she disappeared from history for 50 years. Freda Kirchwey, the editor of The Nation, wrote at the time of her death, "When she spoke to people—whether it was to a small committee or a swarming crowd—hearts beat faster. She was for thousands a symbol of what the free woman might be."

In 2000, Eastman was inducted into the (American) National Women's Hall of Fame in Seneca Falls, New York.

In 2018, The Socialist, the official publication of the Socialist Party USA, published the article "Remembering Socialist Feminist Crystal Eastman" by Lisa Petriello, which was written "on the 90th-year anniversary of her [Eastman's] death to bring her life and legacy once again to the public eye."

== Works ==
=== Papers ===
Eastman's papers are housed at Harvard University.

=== Publications ===
The Library of Congress has the following publications by Eastman in its collection, many of them published posthumously:

- 'Employers' Liability,' a Criticism Based on Facts (1909)
- Work-accidents and the Law (1910)
- Mexican-American Peace Committee (Mexican-American league) (1916)
- Work accidents and the Law (1969)
- Toward the Great Change: Crystal and Max Eastman on Feminism, Antimilitarism, and Revolution, edited by Blanche Wiesen Cook (1976)
- Crystal Eastman on Women and Revolution, edited by Blanche Wiesen Cook (1978)
- "Crystal Eastman: A Revolutionary Life," by Amy Aronson (2020)

== See also ==
=== People ===
- Alice Paul
- Lucy Burns
- Jane Addams
- Lillian D. Wald
- Roger Baldwin
- Norman Thomas
- Walter Fuller
- Jeffrey Fuller
- Max Eastman

=== Political groups ===
- National Woman's Party
- Women's International League for Peace and Freedom
- Woman's Peace Party
- American Union Against Militarism
- National Civil Liberties Bureau/American Civil Liberties Union

=== Other ===
- List of peace activists
- The Pittsburgh Survey
- Workers' compensation
- U.S. Commission on Industrial Relations
- 19th Amendment
- Equal Rights Amendment
- The Liberator
