= Albert DeSilver =

American lawyer and activist

Albert DeSilver (August 27, 1888 – December 7, 1924) was a founding member of the American Civil Liberties Union (ACLU).

DeSilver graduated from Yale in 1910, where he was a member of Skull and Bones, and then earned a law degree at Columbia Law School (1913) (editor Columbia Law Review). Though he was being groomed for a place in New York's legal establishment, he resigned his law practice in 1918 to become one of the founding members of the National Civil Liberties Bureau (later known as the American Civil Liberties Union) to devote himself full-time to defending conscientious objectors, other citizens, and immigrants against persecution under new laws such as the Espionage Act of 1917 and the Sedition Act of 1918. During World War I, DeSilver used his own war bonds to post bail for defendants in free speech cases.

At the founding of the ACLU in 1920, DeSilver was named Associate Director and worked in legal defense, public education, and lobbying. While alive, DeSilver provided more than half of the ACLU's operating funds on an annual basis. He was killed by an express train at 36. After his death, DeSilver's wife, Margaret, continued contributing to the ACLU each year in his name. In her own right Margaret DeSilver acted as a patron of the arts, notably of Modernist poet Basil Bunting.

== Sources ==
- Walter Nelles, A Liberal in Wartime: The Education of Albert DeSilver. New York: WW Norton, 1940.
