= Traveling Hopefully =

1982 film

- Directed by: John G. Avildsen
- Produced by: Steven Haft
- Starring: Roger Nash Baldwin; Norman Lear
- Music by: Bill Conti
- Production company: Arnuthfonyus Films
- Distributed by: Films Inc.
- Release date: 1982
- Running time: 29 minutes
- Country: United States
- Language: English

Traveling Hopefully is a 1982 American short documentary film directed by John G. Avildsen. It was nominated for an Academy Award for Best Documentary Short at the 55th Academy Awards. It focuses on Roger Nash Baldwin, founder of the American Civil Liberties Union. Baldwin tells of how he got interested in civil liberties, and mentions a number of the cases in which the ACLU defended people or entities.

== Reaction ==
Janet Maslin of The New York Times wrote "This is an amiable, well-intentioned documentary, but an extremely superficial one". Also writing in the Times, John J. O'Connor stated that Traveling Hopefully "captures, with warmth, the admirable grittiness of an American original".
