= The Pittsburgh Survey =

The Pittsburgh Survey (1907–1908) was a pioneering sociological study of the city of Pittsburgh, Pennsylvania, United States funded by the Russell Sage Foundation of New York City. It is widely considered a landmark of the Progressive Era reform movement.

The Survey is one of the earliest and most thorough descriptions of urban conditions in the United States. Some seventy investigators, including Elizabeth Beardsley Butler, Margaret Byington, John R. Commons, Edward T. Devine, Crystal Eastman, John A. Fitch, documentary photographer Lewis Hine, and artist Joseph Stella, began work in 1907. The research was first published in magazines, including Collier's, in 1908 & 1909, then was expanded into a series of six books (4 monographs and 2 collections of essays) published from 1909 to 1914.

In the early twentieth century Pittsburgh was America's prototypical industrial city. Immigrants from Central, Eastern and Southern Europe poured in seeking jobs and escape from poverty. Large corporations such as U.S. Steel dominated local governments. Life for most Pittsburgh citizens was famously smokey and hardscrabble. Progressives and urban reformers viewed with alarm working-class and immigrant life, corporate industrialism, and the effects of industrialization on the urban environment.

Survey director Paul Kellogg aimed to connect the reformist purpose with the latest methods of scientific inquiry. He hoped the results would alert the public about the social and environmental ills raging in industrial America and favorably influence policymaking, both corporate and government, in Pittsburgh and throughout the nation.

== Volumes of the Pittsburgh Survey ==
- Volume 1 Butler, Elizabeth Beardsley (1984) [1909]. Women and the Trades. Pittsburgh: University of Pittsburgh Press. ISBN 0-8229-5901-1.
- Volume 2 Eastman, Crystal (1910). Work-Accidents and the Law. New York: Russell Sage Foundation Publications. ISBN none. and at Google Books
- Volume 3 Fitch, John A. (1989) [1910]. The Steel Workers. Pittsburgh: University of Pittsburgh Press. ISBN 0-8229-6091-5.
- Volume 4 Byington, Margaret (1969) [1911]. Homestead: The Households of a Mill Town. Pittsburgh: University of Pittsburgh Press. ISBN 0-8229-8250-1. and at Google Books
- Volume 5 Kellogg, Paul U., ed. (1914). The Pittsburgh District: Civic Frontage. New York: Russell Sage Foundation Publications. ISBN none.
- Volume 6 Kellogg, Paul U., ed. (1914). Wage-Earning Pittsburgh. New York: Russell Sage Foundation Publications. ISBN none.
