= Lillie Shultz =

Lillie Shultz (1904 – April 14, 1981) was a journalist, a writer, an administrator for the American Jewish Congress, communal worker and activist against discrimination.

Lillie (Lillian) Shultz (also spelled Schultz) served from 1933 to 1944, as chief administrative officer and director of publicity at the American Jewish Congress. She was the only woman on the staff. She served on the governing council, was an editor of the Congress Bulletin; an active member of a committee dealing with the 1936 Olympics.

Schultz advocated against oppression and discrimination, and was instrumental in establishing a commission to investigate economic discrimination against Jews in the United States 1933–1944.

Shultz was a leading member of the Jewish Agency for Palestine in 1947 in the negotiations leading to the United Nations recommendation for the partition of Palestine and was a close colleague and co-worker with the Jewish Agency delegation to the UN. She lobbied against nuclear proliferation.

Shultz was born in 1904, in Philadelphia and graduated from the University of Pennsylvania. After her graduation, and her first job as a journalist was with the Philadelphia Jewish World, editing the English-language section.

In an article entitled “Why I Was Jealous: A Sukkoth Memory,” she elaborated about her love of Jewish culture and recalled her grandfather's prayer and longing that have inspired her, her activism.

Shultz was a staff member in the early 1930s of the Jewish Telegraphic Agency, before working for the American Jewish Congress. From 1944 to 1955, she was also director of the Nation Associates, publishers of Nation magazine, as well as a member of its editorial staff.

== See also ==
- Freda Kirchwey
