= The Century Foundation =

Progressive think tank in the United States

- Abbreviation: TCF
- Formation: 1919; 107 years ago
- Type: Public policy think tank
- Headquarters: One Whitehall Street
- Location: New York, New York, U.S.
- President: Julie Margetta Morgan
- Revenue: $8.58 million (2024)
- Expenses: $12.4 million (2024)
- Website: tcf.org

The Century Foundation (established first as The Cooperative League and then the Twentieth Century Fund) is a progressive think tank headquartered in New York City with an office in Washington, D.C. It was founded as a nonprofit public policy research institution.

== History ==
The Century Foundation was founded in 1919 by Edward A. Filene, an American businessman, under the name of The Cooperative League. The organization's mission was to act as an advisory committee for Filene in disbursing his funds.

Renamed the Twentieth Century Fund in 1922, and then The Century Foundation in 1999, the Foundation has sought liberal and progressive solutions to the nation's problems. The Fund's first executive director was Evans Clark (1928–1953), who remained on the board of trustees until his death in 1970. During the 20th century, the Foundation published many reports that informed public policy, including "Stock Market Control", a 1934 report that provided ideas for legislation enacted after the 1929 crash of the stock market; America's Needs and Resources, a 1947 report that set forth a forecast of the nation's needs, industrial production, and income over the following two decades; Jean Gottmann's Megalopolis: The Urbanized Northeastern Seaboard of the United States; the New Federalist Papers by Nelson W. Polsby, Alan Brinkley, and Kathleen Sullivan; and Gunnar Myrdal's Asian Drama: An Inquiry into the Poverty of Nations.

In the wake of the 2000 election, The Century Foundation and the University of Virginia's Miller Center for Public Affairs organized the National Commission on Federal Election Reform, which was co-chaired by former presidents Jimmy Carter and Gerald Ford, and was composed of public figures from across the political spectrum. The commission's charge was to quickly evaluate a large body of research on election reform, review policy proposals, and offer a bipartisan analysis. It released its final report, To Assure Pride and Confidence in the Electoral Process, to Congress and the White House on July 31, 2001.

The Century Foundation also has supported two task forces that examined homeland security issues after the events of September 11, 2001. The first, chaired by Richard A. Clarke, produced a report, "Defeating the Jihadists: A Blueprint for Action", in 2005. The report assessed the nation's successes and failures on homeland security and, building on the recommendations of the 9/11 Commission, offered a detailed action plan for neutralizing the international movement at the core of worldwide terrorism. The second task force, co-chaired by Richard Clarke and Randy Beers, produced the report "The Forgotten Homeland" in 2006, in which leading homeland security experts analyze the nation's most significant vulnerabilities and propose strategies to reduce them. In 2003, The Century Foundation published "The War on Our Freedoms: Civil Liberties in an Age of Terrorism", which included essays by scholars and journalists that pointed out what is wrong with the current rush to limit civil liberties in the name of national security.

In 2001, The Century Foundation published The Fabulous Decade: Macroeconomic Lessons from the 1990s by Janet Yellen and Alan Blinder.

In 2025, TCF produced The Price of Excellence, a short documentary directed by JD Jones examining the unequal treatment and funding of HBCUs compared to non-HBCU peer institutions, with support from The Kresge Foundation. Filmed at North Carolina Agricultural and Technical State University, the film features TCF Senior Fellow Dr. Denise A. Smith and premiered at the Congressional Black Caucus Foundation's Annual Legislative Conference on September 25, 2025.

== See also ==
- Evans Clark
