= International League for Human Rights =

Human rights organization

- Formation: 1942
- Headquarters: New York
- President: Robert Arsenault

The International League for Human Rights (ILHR) is a human rights organization with headquarters in New York City.

Claiming to be the oldest human rights organization in the United States, the ILHR defines its mission as "defending human rights advocates who risk their lives to promote the ideals of a just and civil society in their homelands."

The ILHR had its origins in the Ligue des droits de l'homme et du citoyen, founded in France in the late nineteenth century. The group was reconstituted in New York City in 1942 by European refugees and Roger Nash Baldwin, founder of the American Civil Liberties Union, and was known until 1976 as the International League for the Rights of Man. In 1947, the league was granted consultative status with the United Nations Economic and Social Council (ECOSOC), giving it the right to testify before that body about human rights abuses. The ILHR is also a member of UN's International Coalition to Stop Crimes Against Humanity in North Korea, a committee composed over 40 Human rights organizations around the world.

The President is Robert Arsenault, and the Executive Director is Louise Kantrow.

The ILHR's Internet domain name expired on 3 June 2014 and was not renewed.
