= Paul U. Kellogg =

American journalist

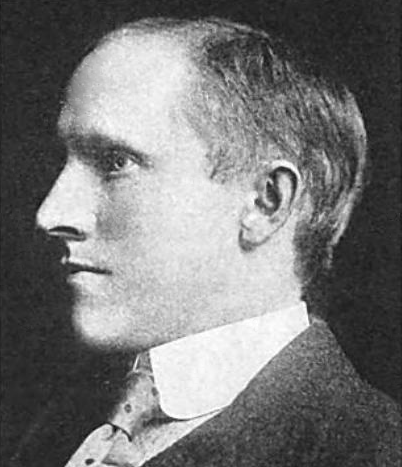
- Born: Paul Underwood Kellogg; September 30, 1879; Kalamazoo, Michigan, US
- Died: November 1, 1958 (aged 79); Village of New Paltz, New York, US
- Occupations: Journalist, activist
- Spouses: Marion Pearce Sherwood (m. 1909, divorced) Helen Hall (m. 1935)

Paul Underwood Kellogg (September 30, 1879 – November 1, 1958) was an American journalist and social reformer.

== Early life and education ==
Paul U. Kellogg was born in Kalamazoo, Michigan on September 30, 1879. After working as a journalist he moved to New York City to study at Columbia University.

He married Marion Pearce Sherwood in 1909. They subsequently divorced, and he remarried to Helen Hall in 1935.

== Journalist ==
After university Kellogg worked for Charities magazine before carrying out an unprecedented, in-depth study of industrial life in Pittsburgh. Published as The Pittsburgh Survey (1910–1914), it became a model for sociologists wishing to employ research to aid social reform. His studies which helped to abolish the seven-day work week.

Kellogg returned to Charities magazine, now retitled Survey magazine. He became editor in 1912 and over the next few years turned into America's leading social work journal.

== Activist ==
An opponent of U.S. involvement in the First World War, Kellogg joined Jane Addams and Oswald Garrison Villard, to persuade Henry Ford, the American industrialist, to organize a peace conference in Stockholm. Ford came up with the idea of sending a boat of pacifists to Europe to determine if they could negotiate an agreement to end the war. He chartered the ship Oskar II, and it sailed from Hoboken, New Jersey, on December 4, 1915. The Ford Peace Ship reached Stockholm in January 1916, and a conference was organized with representatives from neutral countries. In 1918, Kellogg became the chairman of the Foreign Policy Association in New York. During the First World War Kellogg had become appalled by the way people were being persecuted for their political beliefs, particularly by Attorney General A. Mitchell Palmer. In 1920, Kellogg joined with Roger Baldwin, Norman Thomas, Crystal Eastman, Addams, Clarence Darrow, John Dewey, Abraham Muste, Elizabeth Gurley Flynn and Upton Sinclair to form the American Civil Liberties Union. In 1927, Kellogg joined with many prominent liberals in an unsuccessful effort to prevent the execution of anarchist activists Nicola Sacco and Bartolomeo Vanzetti for murder.

Kellogg died in New Paltz, New York on November 1, 1958.

== Sources ==
- Paul U. Kellogg and the Survey: Voices for Social Welfare and Social Justice by Clarke A. Chambers
