= Frances Fenwick Williams =

Canadian writer

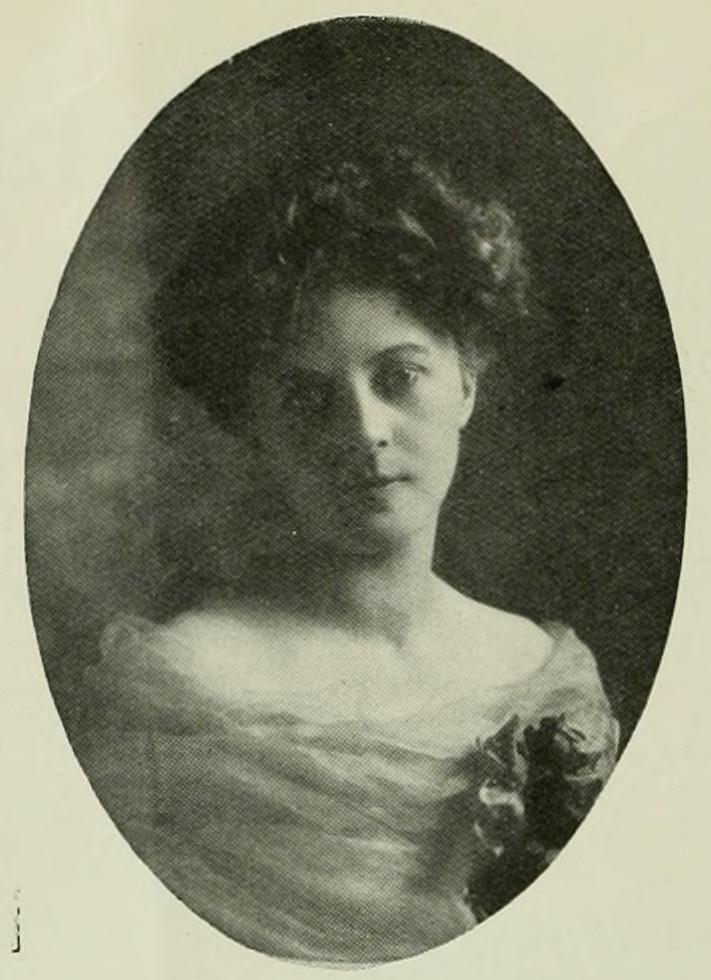
Frances Fenwick Williams circa 1909

Frances de Wolfe Fenwick Williams (fl. 1910–1926) was a Canadian writer. She wrote three novels and one play.

== Life ==
Frances de Wolfe Fenwick was born in Montreal, Quebec, to William I. Fenwick, from Montreal, and Anne Agnes de Wolfe, from Windsor, Nova Scotia. She attended Emerson College in Boston, Massachusetts, and McGill University in Montreal.

== The Arch Satirist ==
Fenwick's first novel, The Arch Satirist (1910), is about the heroine Lynn Thayer's attempts to care for her dissolute brother who has squandered the family fortune. It critiques the behaviour of men in Montreal society of the time. The novel's title is adapted from the concluding line of Tess of the d'Urbervilles by Thomas Hardy, which referred to "Time" as the "arch satirist" in its original serialized version in The Graphic.

== A Soul on Fire ==
Fenwick's second novel, Theodora: A Soul on Fire or just A Soul on Fire, was first published in October 1915.

A young woman, Theodora, suddenly appears in Montreal and shows magical powers. Theodora is attractive and is courted by all the eligible young men of the metropolis, and is engaged several times. But these engagements are invariably broken after a short time, and the young man who has become a party to the betrothal suffers death or serious injury soon after the engagement is broken off.

Her mystery is solved by a clergyman and a scientist. They bring from her subconscious the truth of her magical heritage. This began when Sir Geoffrey Carne, back from the Crusades during the reign of Richard I of England, brought a Saracen bride back with him who is a witch. Sir Geoffrey broke a solemn vow. Salvation will occur only if, in some future incarnation, his wife could find a man that would love her for herself.

Aside from the plot's fantasy elements, there is a strain of humorous social satire. Williams satirizes social climbers, the self-righteous rich, suffragists, and socialites.

== Viking's Rest ==
Viking's Rest was first published in August 1924.

Two young women living in the city, an artist and a newspaper writer, receive a windfall in the form of a $10,000 cheque. With the money, they go to Nova Scotia and proceed to buy a house, the eponymous "Viking's Rest".

== Works ==
- The Arch Satirist (Boston: Lothrop, 1910; Toronto: Macleod and Allen, 1910)
- A Soul on Fire (New York: Lane, 1915; Toronto: Oxford University Press, 1915)
- Viking's Rest: A Story of the Land of Evangeline (Toronto: Goodchild, 1924)
- Which (play, 1926)
