= National Civil Liberties Bureau =

American civil rights organization

- Abbreviation: NCLB
- Predecessor: Civil Liberties Bureau
- Successor: American Civil Liberties Union
- Formation: October 1, 1917; 109 years ago
- Founders: Roger Nash Baldwin; Crystal Eastman
- Dissolved: January 19, 1920; 106 years ago
- Type: Civil rights organization
- Headquarters: New York City, New York
- Key people: Roger Nash Baldwin; Crystal Eastman; Norman Thomas; Albert DeSilver; Clarence Darrow

The National Civil Liberties Bureau (NCLB) was an American civil rights organization founded in 1917, dedicated to opposing World War I, and specifically focusing on assisting conscientious objectors.

The National Civil Liberties Bureau was the reincarnation of the Civil Liberties Bureau (CLB), in conjunction with the Fellowship of Reconciliation, after its split on October 1, 1917, with its parent organization, the American Union Against Militarism (AUAM), which opposed American involvement in World War I.

Roger Nash Baldwin, who had called for a branch of the AUAM designed to protect the rights of conscientious objectors, became the CLB's head, and continued as director of the NCLB. The NCLB provided legal advice and aid for conscientious objectors and those being prosecuted under the Espionage Act of 1917 or Sedition Act of 1918.

The NCLB was subpoenaed by the New York legislature's Joint Legislative Committee to Investigate Seditious Activities, popularly known as the Lusk Committee, which considered the organization's efforts and pacifist ties to be a vehicle for socialist and communist propaganda. From 1918 to 1919 William Gayley Simpson was their associate director. Several decades later, he became a neo-Nazi.

Baldwin felt that the NCLB was ineffectual, and wanted to establish an organization that was more militant and active. Under Baldwin's leadership, NCLB members agreed to dissolve the NCLB and reorganize it under a new name and charter; thus the American Civil Liberties Union was created in 1920.

Notable early leaders and founders of the NCLB include director Roger Nash Baldwin, Crystal Eastman, Norman Thomas, Albert DeSilver, Felix Adler, and Clarence Darrow.

== See also ==
- American Civil Liberties Union
- Knights of Liberty (vigilante group)

== Publications ==
- The "Knights of Liberty" Mob and the I. W. W. Prisoners at Tulsa, Okla. (November, 9, 1917), a report regarding the Tulsa Outrage.
