= Jeffrey Fuller =

Jeffrey Eastman
- Born: March 19, 1917
- Died: February 24, 1970 (aged 52)
- Occupations: Assistant Director of the ACLU, 1954–1959
- Family: Walter Fuller and Crystal Eastman

Jeffrey Fuller (1917–1970) worked for the American Civil Liberties Union (ACLU) from 1948 to 1966 and also served in the U.S. Army during World War II. At the ACLU, Fuller was responsible for membership development and fundraising and also edited their monthly newsletter Civil Liberties.

== Career ==
=== Background ===
Jeffrey Eastman Fuller was born on March 19, 1917, to Walter Fuller and Crystal Eastman, a cofounder of the ACLU. Both died when he was 10. He graduated from Harvard University in 1938 with an A.B. degree in Slavic Languages, History and Literature. He also studied radio and television production at New York University from 1940 to 1941.

Following graduation, Fuller was self-employed as a music dealer specialized in collector-item records and also worked as a guide at the 1939 World's Fair in New York, as assistant radio editor at the New York Post from 1939 to 1940, and as the Public Relations Assistant for the Norris-LaGuardia Independent Citizens Committee for Roosevelt and Wallace in October and November 1940."

=== Army service ===
"In January 1941, Fuller joined the U.S. Army, serving in an MP battalion and at infantry regimental headquarters. He was commissioned as a 2nd lieutenant in October 1942 and served as aide-de-camp to Major General D. H. Connolly, the commanding general at the Persian Gulf Command, traveling extensively with the general and translating Russian and French for him. He served in this capacity until May 1943.

Next, Fuller became Russian liaison officer and civilian personnel officer in Qazvin, Iran, where he worked daily with the Russian command. He returned to the United States in October 1944 for additional training, studying the theory and practice of military government and Japanese language, history and culture at the School of Military Government in Charlottesville, Virginia, and the Civil Affairs Training School at the University of Chicago.

However, his next post continued to utilize his expertise in Russian. From May 1945 to March 1946, Fuller was an OSS field operative, serving in the Research and Analysis Branch of the U.S.S.R. Division in Washington, Berlin, and Central Europe. Fuller was discharged from the Army in June 1946 with the rank of Major, but continued to serve as a major in the reserve, where he specialized in psychological warfare."

=== Private sector ===
"With Michael Bodkin, Fuller founded the Bodkin Research & Manufacturing Co., Inc. in July 1946. He served as vice-president and general partner. The company produced organic plant food and failed in February 1948."

== ACLU ==
"In 1948, Fuller joined the American Civil Liberties Union (ACLU) staff as the Membership Director, responsible for fundraising and membership promotion and maintenance. The majority of his work was conducted through the mail and involved the preparation of letters, leaflets and other promotional material, and he also served as the general financial secretary of the organization. While at the ACLU, he developed an integrated membership system to distribute contributions between the national organization and the member's affiliate, organized new affiliates, and oversaw the Indian Civil Rights Committee. During his tenure, the ACLU grew from 9,000 combined national and affiliate members with 7 affiliates to 48,000 combined members with 27 affiliates.

Fuller left the ACLU in 1959 to serve as the manager of the fundraising department of a direct mail firm. However, Fuller continued as editor of Civil Liberties, the ACLU's monthly publication, a post he held from 1951 to 1966. Civil Liberties was a 4-6 page monthly publication that reported on the ACLU's activities and accomplishments and on current civil liberties issues. Fuller was succeeded as editor by Claire Cooper in 1966."

== Death ==
Fuller died of a heart attack on 24 February 1970.
