= Max Eastman =

American writer and political activist (1883–1969)

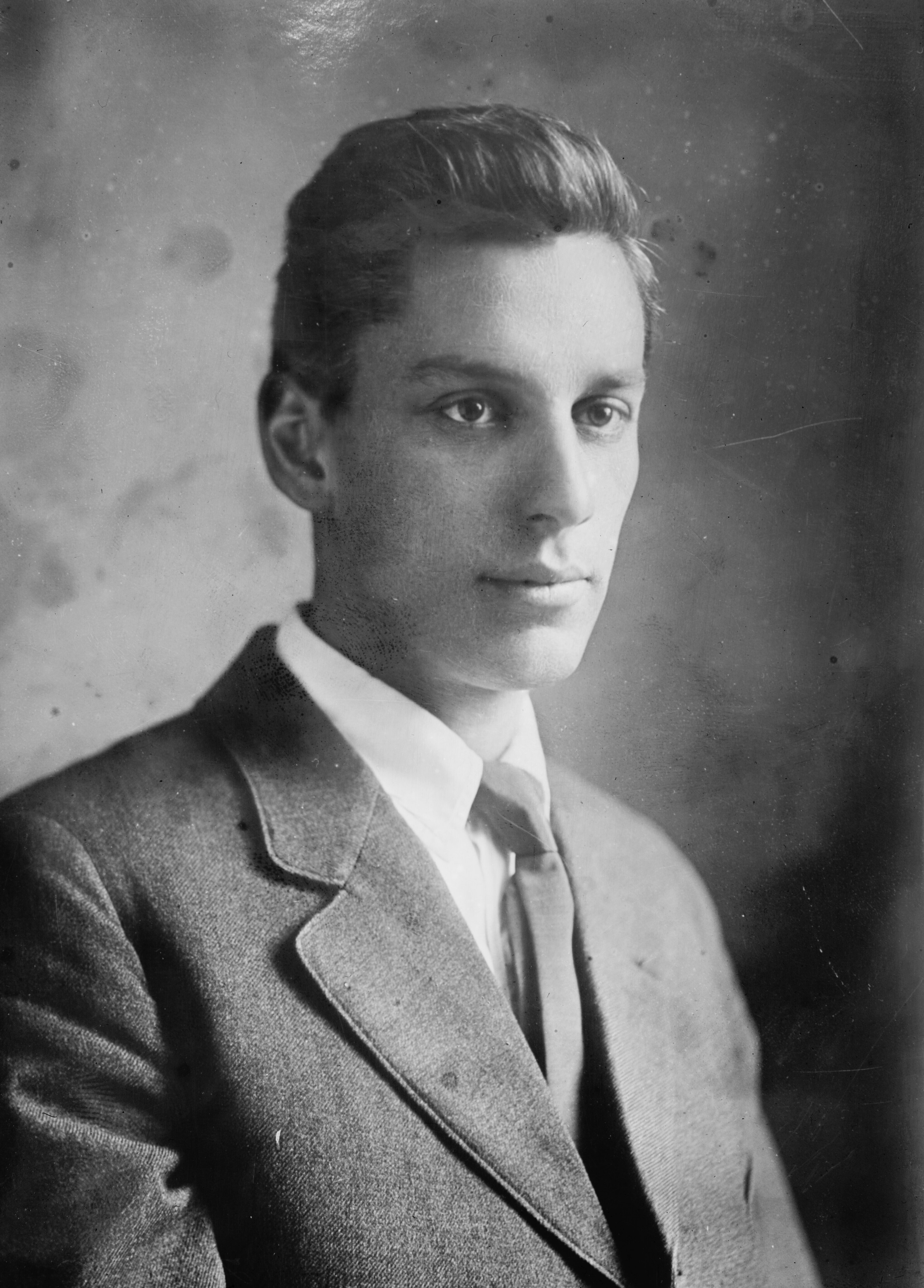
- Born: Max Forrester Eastman; January 4, 1883; Canandaigua, New York, US
- Died: March 25, 1969 (aged 86); Bridgetown, Barbados
- Education: Williams College; Columbia University
- Occupations: Writer; political activist
- Spouses: Ida Rauh (m. 1911–1922) Elena Krylenko (m. 1924–1956) Yvette Skely (m. 1958–1969)

Max Forrester Eastman (January 4, 1883 – March 25, 1969) was an American writer on literature, philosophy, and society, a poet, and a prominent political activist. Moving to New York City for graduate school, Eastman became involved with radical circles in Greenwich Village. He supported socialism and became a leading patron of the Harlem Renaissance and an activist for a number of liberal and radical causes. For several years, he edited The Masses. With his sister Crystal Eastman, he co-founded in 1917 The Liberator, a radical magazine of politics and the arts.

While residing in the Soviet Union from the fall of 1922 to the summer of 1924, Eastman was influenced by the power struggle between Leon Trotsky and Joseph Stalin and the events leading to Stalin's eventual seizure of power. As a result of the Great Purge and the Soviet Union's totalitarianism, he became highly critical first of Stalinism and then of communism and socialism in general. While remaining an atheist, he became an advocate of free market economics and anti-communism. In 1955, he published Reflections on the Failure of Socialism. He published more frequently in National Review and other conservative journals in later life. He publicly opposed United States involvement in the Vietnam War in the 1960s.

== Early life and education ==
Eastman was born in 1883 in Canandaigua, Ontario County, New York, the fourth of four children. His older brother died the following year at age seven. His father, Samuel Elijah Eastman, was a minister in the Congregational Church, and his mother, Annis Bertha Ford (1852–1910), joined him in 1889, one of the first women in the United States to be ordained in a Protestant church. They served together as pastors at the church of Thomas K. Beecher near Elmira, New York. This area was part of the "burned-over district", which earlier in the 19th century had generated much religious excitement, resulting in the founding of the Seventh-day Adventist Church and the Latter Day Saint movement. In addition, religion inspired such social causes as abolitionism and support for the Underground Railroad. Through his parents, Max became acquainted in his youth with their friend, the noted author Samuel Clemens, better known as Mark Twain.

Eastman graduated with a bachelor's degree from Williams College in 1905. His good friend and roommate while at Williams was Charles Whittlesey, later known as the Lost Battalion commanding officer and a World War I hero. From 1907 to 1911, Eastman completed the work toward a PhD in philosophy at Columbia University under the noted philosopher John Dewey. He also was a member of both the Delta Psi and Phi Beta Kappa fraternities.

Settling in Greenwich Village with his older sister Crystal Eastman, he became involved in political causes, including helping to found the Men's League for Women's Suffrage in 1910. While at Columbia, he was an assistant in the philosophy department as well as a lecturer in the psychology department. After completing the requirements for his doctoral degree, he refused to accept it and simply withdrew in 1911. He spent summers and weekends with Crystal in Croton-on-Hudson, where he bought a house in 1916.

== Leading radical ==
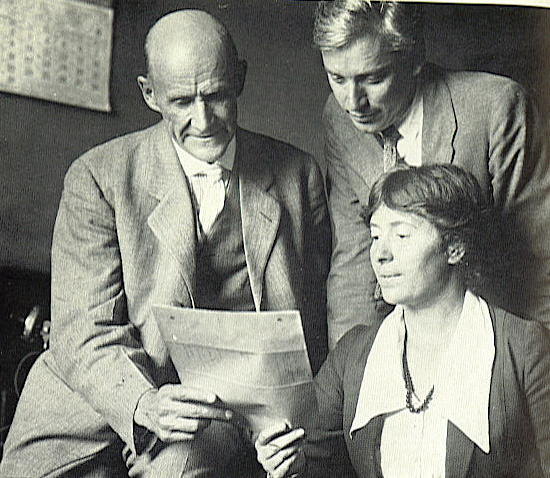
Eugene V. Debs, Eastman, and Rose Pastor Stokes, 1918

Eastman became a key figure in the left-leaning Greenwich Village community and lived in its influence for many years. He combined this with his academic experience to explore varying interests, including literature, psychology, and social reform. In 1913, he became editor of the US' leading socialist periodical, The Masses, a magazine that combined social philosophy and the arts. Its contributors during his tenure included Sherwood Anderson, Louise Bryant, Floyd Dell, Amy Lowell, Mabel Dodge Luhan, Robert Minor, John Reed, Carl Sandburg, Upton Sinclair, and Art Young. That same year, Eastman published Enjoyment of Poetry, an examination of literary metaphor from a psychological point of view. During this period, he also became a noted advocate of free love and birth control.

In his first editorial for The Masses, Eastman wrote:

This magazine is owned and published cooperatively by its editors. It has no dividends to pay, and nobody is trying to make money out of it. A revolutionary and not a reform magazine: a magazine with a sense of humour and no respect for the respectable: frank, arrogant, impertinent, searching for true causes: a magazine directed against rigidity and dogma wherever it is found: printing what is too naked or true for a money-making press: a magazine whose final policy is to do as it pleases and conciliate nobody, not even its readers.

The numerous denunciations of US participation in World War I published in The Masses, many written by Eastman, provoked controversy and reaction from authorities. Eastman was twice indicted and stood trial under provisions of the Sedition Act, but he was acquitted each time. In a July 1917 speech, he complained that the government's aggressive prosecutions of dissent meant that "[y]ou can't even collect your thoughts without getting arrested for unlawful assemblage". In 1918, The Masses was forced to close due to criminal charges based on the Espionage Act of 1917.

Eastman raised the money to send the radical John Reed to Russia in 1917. His magazine published Reed's articles from Russia, later collected as Ten Days That Shook the World, his notable account of the Bolshevik Revolution.

Eastman had even delivered anti-war speeches on behalf of the People's Council of America for Democracy and the Terms of Peace.

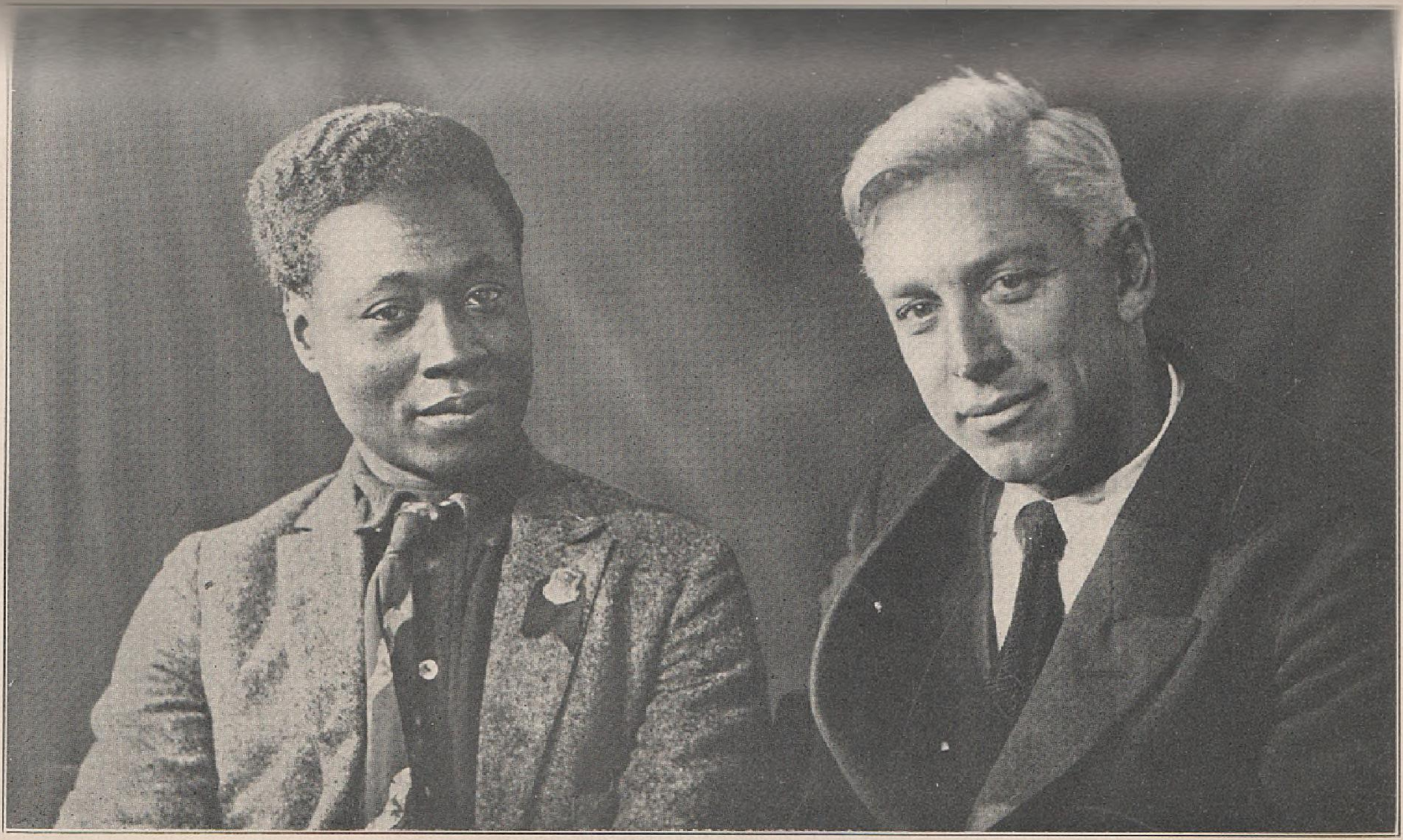
Eastman and Claude McKay as delegates to the 4th World Congress of the Communist International

In 1919, Eastman and his sister Crystal (who the next year was one of the founders of American Civil Liberties Union) created a similar publication titled The Liberator. They published such writers as E. E. Cummings, John Dos Passos, Ernest Hemingway, Helen Keller, Claude McKay and Edmund Wilson. In 1922, the magazine was acquired by the Workers Party of America after continuing financial troubles. In 1924, The Liberator was merged with two other publications to create The Workers Monthly. Eastman ended his association with the magazine.

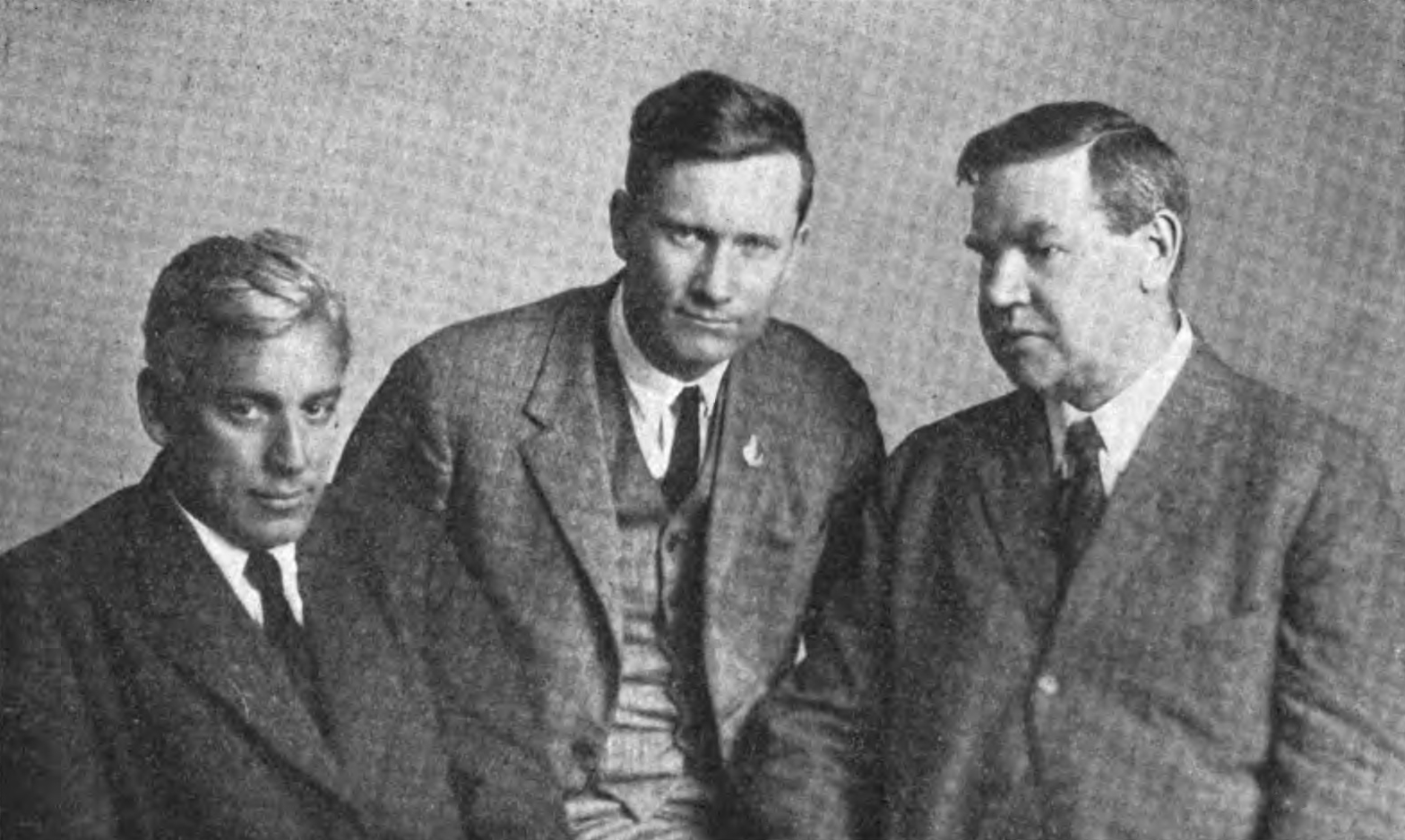
Eastman (left) with James P. Cannon (center) and Bill Haywood in Moscow c. 1923

In 1922, Eastman embarked on a fact-finding tour of the Soviet Union to learn about the Soviet implementation of Marxism. He stayed for a year and nine months, observing the power struggles between Leon Trotsky and Joseph Stalin. After attending the Party Congress of May 1924, he left Russia in June of that year. He remained in Europe for the next three years.

Upon returning to the United States in 1927, Eastman published several works that were highly critical of the Stalinist system, beginning with "Since Lenin Died", which was written in 1925. In that essay, he described Lenin's Testament, a copy of which Eastman had smuggled out of Russia. In it, Vladimir Lenin proposed changes to the structure of the Soviet government, criticized the leading members of the Soviet leadership and suggested Stalin be removed from his position as General Secretary of the Soviet Communist Party. The Soviet leadership denounced Eastman's account and used party discipline to force Trotsky, then still a member of the Politburo, to write an article denying Eastman's version of the events. In other essays, Eastman described conditions for artists and political activists in Russia. Such essays made Eastman unpopular with American leftists of the time. In later years, his writings on the subject were cited by many on both the left and the right as sober and realistic portrayals of the Soviet system under Stalin.

Eastman's experiences in the Soviet Union and his studies afterward led him to change his view of Marxism as practiced in Soviet Russia under Stalin. However, his commitment to left-wing political ideas continued unabated. While in the Soviet Union, Eastman began a friendship with Trotsky, which endured through the latter's exile to Mexico. In 1940, Trotsky was assassinated there by an agent of Stalin. Having mastered the Russian language in little more than a year, Eastman translated several of Trotsky's works into English, including his monumental three-volume History of the Russian Revolution. He also translated and published works by the poet Alexander Pushkin, including The Gabrieliad.

During the 1930s, Eastman continued writing critiques of contemporary literature. He published several works in which he criticized James Joyce and other modernist writers who, he claimed, fostered "the Cult of Unintelligibility". These were controversial at a time when the modernists were highly admired. When Eastman had asked Joyce why his book was written in a very difficult style, Joyce famously replied: "To keep the critics busy for three hundred years".

Eastman published The Literary Mind (1931) and Enjoyment of Laughter (1936) in which he also criticized some elements of Freudian theory. In the 1930s, he debated the meaning of Marxism with the philosopher Sidney Hook (like Eastman, he had studied under John Dewey at Columbia University) in a series of public exchanges. Eastman was a traveling lecturer throughout the 1930s and 1940s, when he spoke on various literary and social topics in cities across the country.

=== Contributions to the women's rights movement ===
Eastman was a notable member of the women's rights movement in the early 20th century. He served as President of the Men's Equal Suffrage League in New York and was a founding member of the Men's League for Women's Suffrage in New York in 1910. In 1913, he spoke at Bryn Mawr College on the subject of women's suffrage in a speech titled "Woman Suffrage and Why I Believe in It".

== Changing political beliefs ==
Hegelism is like a mental disease—you cannot know what it is until you get it, and then you can't know because you've got it.

— Max Eastman, Marx, Lenin and the Science of Revolution (1926), p. 22

Following the Great Depression, Eastman started to abandon his socialist beliefs, becoming increasingly critical of the ideas of Karl Marx, Thorstein Veblen, and Georg Wilhelm Friedrich Hegel, whom he had once admired.

In 1941, he was hired as a roving editor for Reader's Digest magazine, a position he held for the remainder of his life. About this time, he also became a friend and admirer of the noted free market economists Friedrich Hayek, Ludwig von Mises, and Wilhelm Röpke. He allied with the American writers James Burnham, John Chamberlain, and John Dos Passos. Nobel laureate economist Hayek referred to Eastman's life and to his repudiation of socialism in his widely read The Road to Serfdom. Eastman arranged for the serialization of Hayek's work in Reader's Digest. Later, Eastman wrote articles critical of socialism for The Freeman, an early libertarian publication edited by his friends John Chamberlain and Henry Hazlitt.

Initially, Eastman had supported the House Un-American Activities Committee (HUAC) and Senator Joseph McCarthy's public attacks on the influence of communism. In the early 1950s, Eastman's anti-communist articles in the Reader's Digest, The Freeman, and the National Review played an important role in what became known as McCarthyism. However, he soon came to believe that the anti-communist movement was "taken over by reactionary forces who confused the quest of social justice with communist treason". In 1955, his repudiation of the left reached a high-water mark with the publication of Reflections on the Failure of Socialism. By this time, he had come to believe that the Bolshevik Revolution "rather than producing freedom, produced the most perfect tyranny in all history". Also in 1955, he became one of the original contributing editors of the conservative National Review magazine.

In the 1950s, Eastman joined the classical liberal Mont Pelerin Society, founded by Hayek and Mises. He was a participating member of the American Committee for Cultural Freedom at the invitation of Sidney Hook. Although he became aligned with conservative political thinkers, Eastman remained a lifelong atheist.

In the 1960s, he broke with his friend William F. Buckley Jr. and resigned from the National Review's Board of Associates on the grounds that the magazine was too explicitly pro-Christian.

Shortly after this, he began to publicly oppose American involvement in the Vietnam War. Despite his advocacy of free market economics, Eastman had a range of views that were unconventional for a political conservative. Favoring the self-description of "radical conservative", he rejected the label "libertarian" then being used by political writer Rose Wilder Lane. They engaged in an acrimonious correspondence. Eastman associated the term with the ideas of the writer Albert Jay Nock.

Daniel Oppenheimer writes in the left-leaning The New Republic that Eastman's last years were a period of decline in influence:

His writing was more predictable and less generous in spirit. He led no magazines, and wasn't particularly central to those to which he contributed. He wielded some influence in conservative and anti-communist circles, through organizations like the American Committee for Cultural Freedom and magazines like National Review, but he was essential to none of them. His memoirs, Enjoyment of Living in 1948 and Love and Revolution in 1964, were interesting as documents of his age, and for their unusual frankness about sex, but they weren't great books.

== Assessment of literary works ==
A prolific writer, Eastman published more than twenty books on subjects as diverse as the scientific method, humor, Freudian psychology and Soviet culture as well as memoirs and recollections of his noted friendships. His biographical portraits have been called "brilliant" and his psychological study of the young Leon Trotsky "pioneering" by the historian John Patrick Diggins.

Eastman composed five volumes of poetry and a novel. In addition, he translated into English some of the work of Alexander Pushkin. For the Modern Library, he edited and abridged Marx's Das Kapital.

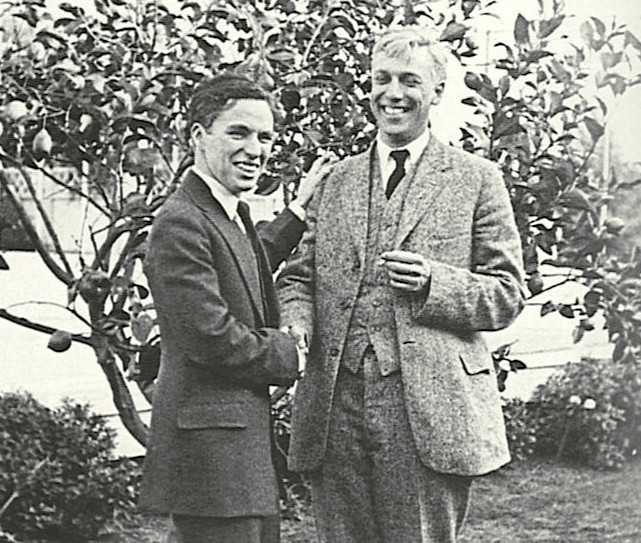
Charlie Chaplin and Eastman in Hollywood, 1919

Eastman also wrote two volumes of memoirs as well as two volumes of recollections of his friendships and personal encounters with many of the leading figures of his time. Eastman's last memoir was Love and Revolution: My Journey Through an Epoch (1964). In March 1969, he died at his home in Bridgetown, Barbados at the age of 86.

== Selected works ==
- Enjoyment of Poetry, 1913.
- Child of the Amazons, and other Poems, 1913.
- Journalism Versus Art, 1916.
- Conscription for what? (The Masses, July 1917)
- Colors of life; poems and songs and sonnets, 1918.
- The Sense of Humor, 1921.
- Leon Trotsky: The Portrait of a Youth, 1925
- Since Lenin Died, 1925.
- Venture 1927
- Marx and Lenin: The Science of Revolution, 1927.
- The End of Socialism in Russia, 1928.
- The Literary Mind: Its Place in an Age of Science, 1931.
- Artists in Uniform: a Study of Literature and Bureaucratism, 1934.
- Art and the Life of Action, 1934.
- The Last Stand of Dialectic Materialism : A Study of Sidney Hook's Marxism. New York: Polemic Publishers, 1934.
- Enjoyment of Laughter, 1936.
- Stalin's Russia and the Crisis in Socialism, 1939.
- Marxism: Is It a Science?, 1940.
- Heroes I Have Known, 1942.
- Enjoyment of Living, 1948.
- Reflections on the Failure of Socialism, 1955.
- Great Companions: Critical Memoirs of Some Famous Friends. New York: Farrar, Straus and Gudahy. 1959 – via Internet Archive.
- Love and Revolution: My Journey Through an Epoch, 1964.
- Seven Kinds of Goodness, 1967

== Representation in other media ==
- Eastman narrated the documentary film Tsar to Lenin (1937).
- At the arrangement of Eastman, the American magazine Reader's Digest published an abridged version of Friedrich Hayek's "The Road to Serfdom", enabling the book and Hayek's ideas to reach a wide non-academic audience (1945).
- Edward Herrmann portrayed Eastman in the film Reds (1981), directed by and starring Warren Beatty, which was based on the life of John Reed. John Patrick Diggins, Eastman's biographer, said that it was ironic that Herrmann was cast as Eastman, who was an extremely handsome man while the good-looking Beatty portrayed Reed, who had a bookish appearance.
- He was portrayed by actor Mark Pellegrino in the 2012 TV movie Hemingway & Gellhorn, directed by Philip Kaufman.
- He is mentioned in James Thurber's memoir, The Years With Ross (1959). Thurber quotes Wolcott Gibbs as saying of Eastman's The Enjoyment of Laughter: "It seems to me Eastman has got American humor down and broken its arm".
- He appears in Thomas Hart Benton's 1930 mural "America Today", sitting on a subway ogling the burlesque actress Peggy Reynolds.

== Personal life ==
After moving to New York City, Eastman married Ida Rauh in 1911, a lawyer, actress, writer, fellow radical and early feminist. Rauh kept her last name. In late 1916 Max began a love affair with the young actress Florence Deshon (1893-1922), who was also a lover of Charlie Chaplin, and who commuted between New York and Los Angeles. In early February 1922 she committed suicide, which traumatized Eastman. He and Ida divorced that year, some years after being separated. Together they had one child, Dan, with whom Eastman had no connection for 23 years after their separation. Eastman credited Rauh with introducing him to socialism.

In 1924, he married the painter Elena Krylenko, a native of Moscow, whom he had met during his nearly two-year stay in the Soviet Union. Elena was sister to Nikolai Krylenko, a Bolshevik who later became the Soviet Commissar of Justice. He organized many of Joseph Stalin's infamous "show trials" of the 1930s, before being arrested and executed himself during the Great Purge in 1938. Elena had been working for Maxim Litvinov in the Ministry of Foreign Affairs, although she was not a member of the party herself. In 1924, Elena decided to leave Russia with Eastman. Litvinov agreed to help by passing her off as a member of his delegation when he traveled to London for an international conference. But she could not leave the delegation and remain in a free country without a passport, which the Bolsheviks would not give her. So, in the hours before their train left, she and Max Eastman married. Elena died in 1956.

In 1958, Eastman married Yvette Szkely, who was born in Budapest in 1912. She emigrated to New York with her divorced stepmother. She had a long-term relationship with Theodore Dreiser before her marriage to Eastman. In 1995, she published a memoir, Dearest Wilding. She died in New York in 2014 at the age of 101.

Throughout his life, Eastman had many affairs, which "as he aged, came to seem sad and compulsive".
