= Roger Nash Baldwin =

American Civil Liberties Union co-founder (1884–1981)

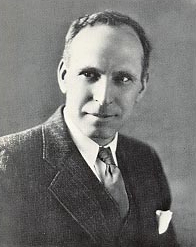

Executive Director of the American Civil Liberties Union
- In office 1917–1950
- Succeeded by: Patrick Murphy Malin

Personal details
- Born: January 21, 1884 Wellesley, Massachusetts, U.S.
- Died: August 26, 1981 (aged 97) Ridgewood, New Jersey, U.S.
- Education: Harvard University (BA, MA)

Academic work
- Discipline: Sociology
- Institutions: Washington University in St. Louis

Roger Nash Baldwin (January 21, 1884 – August 26, 1981) was an American author and pacifist who co-founded the American Civil Liberties Union (ACLU). He served as executive director of the ACLU until 1950.

Many of the ACLU's original landmark cases took place under his direction, including the Scopes Trial, the Sacco and Vanzetti murder trial, and its challenge to the ban on James Joyce's Ulysses.

== Life and work ==
=== Early years ===
Baldwin was born in Wellesley, Massachusetts, the son of Lucy Cushing (Nash) and Frank Fenno Baldwin. He earned his bachelor's and master's degrees at Harvard University; afterwards, he moved to St. Louis on the advice of Louis D. Brandeis. There he taught sociology at Washington University in St. Louis, worked as a social worker and became chief probation officer of the St. Louis Juvenile Court. He also co-wrote Juvenile Courts and Probation with Bernard Flexner at this time; this book became very influential in its era, and was, in part, the foundation of Baldwin's national reputation.

=== Career ===
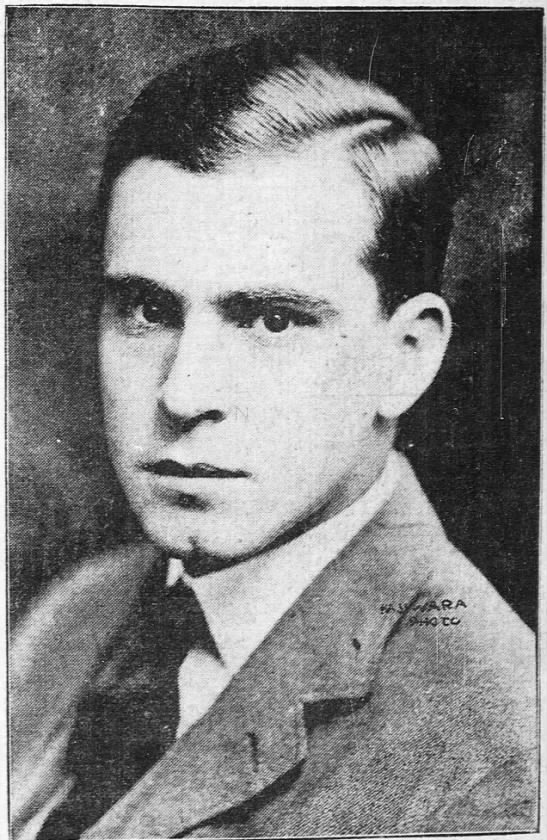
Baldwin c. 1910

Baldwin was a member of the American Union Against Militarism (AUAM), which opposed American involvement in World War I. After the passage of the Selective Service Act of 1917, Baldwin called for the AUAM to create a legal division to protect the rights of conscientious objectors. On July 1, 1917, the AUAM created the Civil Liberties Bureau (CLB), headed by Baldwin. The CLB separated from the AUAM on October 1, 1917, renaming itself the National Civil Liberties Bureau, with Baldwin as director. In 1920, NCLB was renamed the American Civil Liberties Union, with Baldwin continuing as the ACLU's first executive director.

In the meantime, on 30 October 1918, as a conscientious objector himself, refusing even to register for the draft, undergo medical examination, or accept any alternative service such as farming, was sentenced at the Federal Court in New York City to a year in a penitentiary.

As director of ACLU, Baldwin was integral to the shape of the association's early character; it was under Baldwin's leadership that the ACLU undertook some of its most famous cases, including the Scopes Trial, the Sacco and Vanzetti murder trial, and its challenge to the ban on James Joyce's Ulysses. Baldwin retired from the ACLU leadership in 1950. He remained active in politics for the rest of his life; for example, he co-founded the International League for the Rights of Man, which is now known as the International League for Human Rights.

In St. Louis, Baldwin had been greatly influenced by the radical social movement of the anarchist Emma Goldman. He joined the Industrial Workers of the World. Roger Baldwin oversaw, documented and supplied funding for a large number of defense cases for I.W.W. members and investigations throughout the United States. A fully accessible archive of his correspondence with I.W.W branches, investigators and attorneys has been published by Princeton's Mudd Manuscript Library.

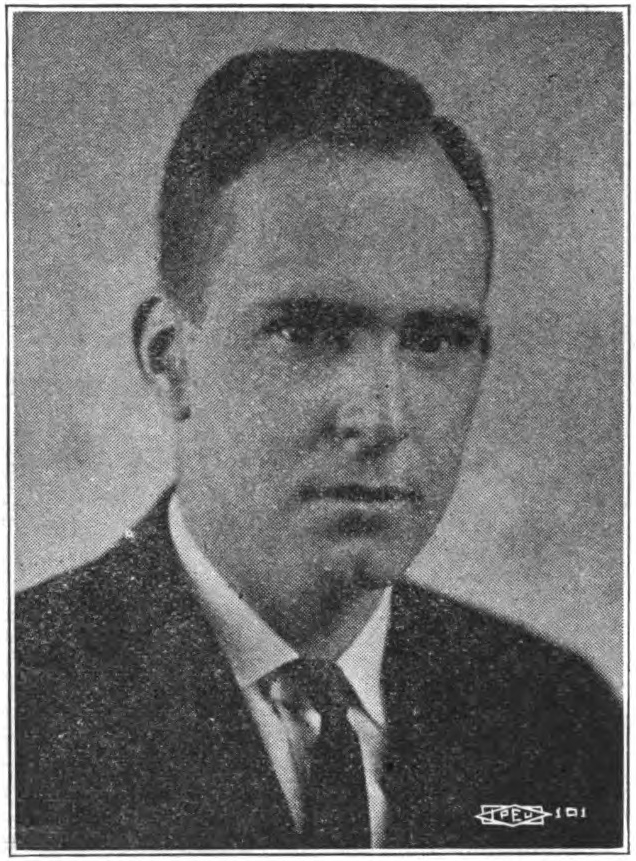
Baldwin c. 1923

In 1924, Attorney General Harlan F. Stone had the newly-appointed Bureau of Investigation Director J. Edgar Hoover meet with Baldwin to reach an agreement regarding the limits of the Bureau's power. Baldwin wrote to Stone that Hoover "meets any suggestion which any of us could possibly make".

In 1927, he had visited the Soviet Union and wrote a book, Liberty Under the Soviets. Later, however, as more and more information came out about Joseph Stalin's regime in the Soviet Union, Baldwin became more and more disillusioned with communism and in 1953 called it "A NEW SLAVERY" (capitalized in the original). He condemned "the inhuman communist police state tyranny, forced labor." In the 1940s, Baldwin led the campaign to purge the ACLU of Communist Party members.

In 1947, General Douglas MacArthur invited him to Japan to foster the growth of civil liberties in that country. In Japan, he founded the Japan Civil Liberties Union, and the Japanese government awarded him the Order of the Rising Sun. In 1948, Germany and Austria invited him for similar purposes. He was elected a Fellow of the American Academy of Arts and Sciences in 1951.

=== Later years ===
In 1968, Washington University awarded Baldwin an honorary doctorate of Laws degree.

President Jimmy Carter awarded Baldwin the Medal of Freedom on January 16, 1981.

=== Death and legacy ===
A resident of Oakland, New Jersey, Baldwin died of heart failure on August 26, 1981, at The Valley Hospital in Ridgewood, New Jersey.

He is the subject of John G. Avildsen's 1982 documentary Traveling Hopefully.

He is the narrator of the 1979 documentary The Wobblies.

== See also ==
- International Labor Defense
- Workers Defense Union

== Works ==
=== Books and pamphlets ===
- Juvenile Courts and Probation. With Bernard Flexner. New York: The Century Company, 1914.
- Liberty Under the Soviets. New York: Vanguard Press, 1928.
- Civil Liberties and Industrial Conflict. With Clarence B. Randall. Cambridge, MA: Harvard University Press, 1938.
- The Rights of Man are Worth Defending. With Pauli Murray. New York: League For Adult Education, 1942.
- Democracy in Trade Unions: A Survey, with a Program of Action. New York, American Civil Liberties Union, 1943.
- Human Rights: World Declaration and American Practice. New York, Public Affairs Committee, 1950.
- A New Slavery: Forced Labor: The Communist Betrayal of Human Rights. New York, Oceana Publications, 1953.

=== Articles ===
- "Freedom in the USA and the USSR," New York: Soviet Russia Today, 1934.
- "Liberalism and the United Front," in Irving Talmadge (ed.), Whose revolution? A Study of the Future Course of Liberalism in the United States, edited by Irving Talmadge New York: Howell, Soskin, 1941.
- "The Making of a Reformer: The Roger Baldwin Story: A Prejudiced Account by Himself," in Woody Klein, Liberties Lost: The Endangered Legacy of the ACLU. Westport, CT: Praeger Publishers, 2006.

=== Books edited ===
- Peter Kropotkin, Revolutionary Pamphlets: A Collection of Writings. New York: Vanguard Press, 1927.
