= Mabel Potter Daggett =

American writer, journalist, editor and suffragist

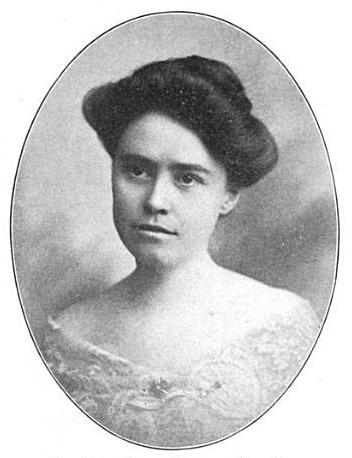
- Born: Mabel Potter; February 14, 1871; Syracuse, New York
- Died: November 13, 1927 (aged 56)
- Education: Syracuse University
- Occupation: Journalist
- Spouse: John Duval Daggett
- Writing career
- Language: English

Mabel Potter Daggett (February 14, 1871 – November 13, 1927) was an American writer, journalist, editor and suffragist. Daggett reported from France during World War I, wrote a biography of Queen Marie of Romania, and was active in the woman's movement in the US.

== Early life and education ==
Mabel Potter was born in Syracuse, New York, daughter of Albert and Sarah Louise (Hobbie) Potter. She graduated from Syracuse University in 1895.

== Career ==
As a journalist, Mabel Potter Daggett wrote and edited for newspapers and magazines. She was an editor on Hampton's Magazine and The Delineator, a women's magazine associated with Theodore Dreiser. Among her articles was a 1911 indictment of yoga, then trendy among society women, which she described as leading to lost fortunes, ruined looks, "domestic infelicity, insanity, and death", and a report from Argonne Cemetery after World War I. She was part of a wartime tour of Paris and Reims in 1916, one of six American journalists invited to witness the war's effects. "There are fields in France that are planted with black crosses, acres and acres of them," she reported in the Pictorial Review. "After each new push on the front, more are required, black crosses by the cartload!"

As a writer, Daggett was the author of several books, including In Lockerbie Street (1909, an appreciation of poet James Whitcomb Riley), Women Wanted: The Story Written in Blood Red Letters on the Horizon of the Great World War (1918, a book about women and World War I), and a well-reviewed biography of Marie of Romania (1926).

Daggett was active as a feminist and suffragist. The editor of Good Housekeeping magazine declared, "The modern woman has few more determined and capable champions than Mabel Potter Daggett." She was a member of Heterodoxy, a feminist club based in Greenwich Village; other Heterodites included her fellow Delineator editors Sarah Field Splint and Katherine Leckie. In 1914 she toured in Europe to report on the conditions of women's lives. In 1918 and 1926 she was a speaker at the General Federation of Women's Clubs biannual convention. She served on the executive committee of the National Birth Control League with fellow Heterodites Elinor Byrns and Kathleen de Vere Taylor.

== Personal life ==
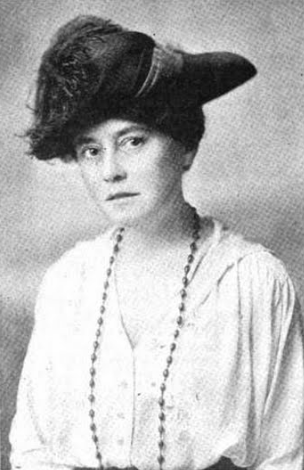
Mabel Potter Daggett (1918)

Mabel Potter married John Duval Daggett in 1901.

Daggett lived at the Pen and Brush Club in New York City at the time of her death in 1927.
