= Sidney Easton =

American dramatist (1885–1971)

- Born: October 2, 1885; Savannah, Georgia, U.S.
- Died: December 24, 1971 (aged 86)
- Occupations: Actor, stage performer, playwright, composer, vocalist, pianist

Sidney Easton (October 2, 1885 – December 24, 1971) was an African-American actor, stage performer, playwright, composer, vocalist, and pianist. He worked as a performer in minstrel shows, carnivals, burlesque, and vaudeville. Starting in the 1930s he appeared in films.

== Biography ==
Sidney Easton was born on October 2, 1885, in Savannah, Georgia. However some sources have his date of birth as 1886 or 1891. Easton was the eldest of six children, his parents were Eva and King Easton. In childhood, Easton went to work for the John Robinson Circus and later with the A.G. Allan Minstrel Show. He was married to performer Sarah Dooley from 1913 to 1920, ending in her death.

Easton was a member of the Easton Trio. Many of his songs were recorded by various musicians in the 1920s including Elizabeth Smith, Margaret Johnson, Martha Copeland, Fats Waller, Fess Williams and his Royal Flush Orchestra, Joe Simms, Ethel Waters and the Ebony Four, George Bias, Stewart Wille, Virginia Liston, Clarence Williams and the Clarence Williams’ Blue Five, and Eva Taylor.

Easton had a few successful collaborations with the singer Ethel Waters, including the lyrics and composition of the song, "Go Back to Where You Stayed Last Night". Easton was the lyric and instrumental composer and served as a co-producer alongside Joe Simms of the traveling show, Sons of Rest (1920).

In the 1940s, he sued 20th Century Fox the makers of the film, Lifeboat (1944) for having used his play Lifeboat 13 to write the script. The case settled out of court four years later.

The New York Public Library's Schomburg Center for Research in Black Culture has a collection of his papers.

== Theater and stage ==
Theater and stage credits
Name	Dates	Role	Notes
How've You Been?	1925	Performer, "the happy bootblack"	Traveling musical revue by Pollock Productions, music by Donald Heywood
Darktown Scandals	1927	Performer	Traveling musical revue by Eddie Hunter
Kilpatrick's (Old Time Minstrels)	April 19, 1930 – April 26, 1930	Performer	Nine performances at the Royale Theatre, by Henry Myers. Performances were done by an African American cast, however many wore blackface to appear darker and red lips.
The Pursuit of Happiness	1933 – 1934	Performer, Mose	Musical revue at the Sam S. Shubert Theatre in Kansas City, by Alan Child, and Isabelle Louden.
The Case of Philip Lawrence	June 7, 1937 – July 31, 1937	Performer, first bodyguard	
At Home With Ethel Waters	September 22, 1953 – October 10, 1953	Composer	Music and lyrics for "Go Back Where You Stayed Last Night"
After Midnight	November 2013 – June 2014	Composer	Music and lyrics

== Filmography ==
Film credits
Year	Name	Role	Notes
1931	His Woman	Mark	Film based on the novel The Sentimentalists by Dale Collins (Boston, 1927).
1932	Wayward	George	Film based on the novel Wild Beauty by Mateel Howe Farnham (New York, 1930).
1939	Paradise in Harlem	Sneeze Ancrum	Easton performed with Babe Matthews in this film.
1941	Murder on Lenox Avenue	Speed Simmons	
1940	Sunday Sinners	Bootsie	
1946	Fight That Ghost	Spooky Lighting	
1947	The Story of Mr. Hobbs	Ben (butler)	
1948	Killer Diller	policeman	
1948	Boarding House Blues	Boo Boo	
