= Mary Heaton Vorse =

American journalist (1874–1966)

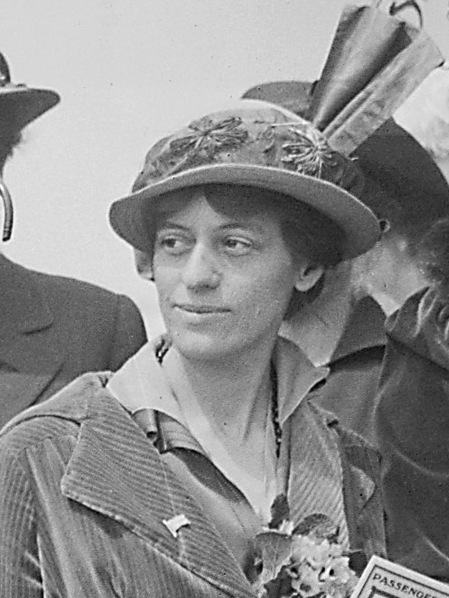
- Vorse aboard the Dutch liner Noordam 1915
- Born: October 11, 1874
- Died: June 14, 1966 (aged 91)
- Citizenship: United States
- Occupations: Journalist, writer
- Employer(s): Atlantic Monthly, Harper's Magazine, Hearst Newspapers, McCall's, New York Post, New York World, The Masses, The Washington Post, Bureau of Indian Affairs
- Organization(s): Heterodoxy, Woman Suffrage Party, Woman's Peace Party
- Notable work: Autobiography of an Elderly Women, Men and Steel, Strike!, The Whole Family: a Novel by Twelve Authors.

Mary Heaton Vorse (October 11, 1874 – June 14, 1966) was an American journalist and novelist with commitments to the labor and feminist movements. She established her reputation as a journalist reporting the labor protests of a largely female and immigrant workforce in the east-coast textile industry. Her later fiction drew on this material profiling the social and domestic struggles of working women. Unwilling to be a disinterested observer, she participated in labor and civil protests. After returning as correspondent from Bolshevik Russia she was for a period the subject of regular US Justice Department surveillance.

== Early life ==
Mary Heaton was born October 11, 1874, in New York City to Ellen and Hiram Heaton. Her father was a successful hotelier, but the family's fortune, which was considerable, was her mother's legacy as the widow of Captain Charles Bernard Marvin, a shipping magnate and liquor merchant.

From the family home in Amherst, a college town in western Massachusetts, she travelled extensively with her parents. They variously wintered in California and in Europe: she attended kindergarten in Hanover and the first year of grade school in Dresden. While her father encouraged an interest in history, her mother was sufficiently unconventional to induce a disdain for the restrictions of ladies' fashion (Ellen Heaton was a supporter of the women's dress reform movement) and to indulge her daughter in the study of art, first in Paris and then, in 1896, at the Art Students' League in New York City. While Mary found participation in the artistic avant-garde exhilarating, she was herself to conclude that she had only modest talents as a visual artist.

== Marriages and children ==
In 1898, Mary Heaton met and married Albert White Vorse, a thirty-two-year-old newspaperman, arctic adventurer and aspiring author. They began to take an interest in the social questions of the day, spurred by the muckraking reformist politics of the era and their friendship with radical journalist Lincoln Steffens. Bert was soon assigned to Paris as the correspondent of the Philadelphia Ledger. It was in France that Mary, encouraged and instructed by her husband, began to try her own hand at professional writing.

For a time the Vorses settled in Venice. There she received what she later claimed was her baptism into the labor movement as a witness to the 1904 Italian general strike. In a procession of two thousand people, Mary Vorse made giddy by what she called the "peculiar, beautiful contagion" of mass solidarity, marched arm in arm with two girl workers down the Merceria to the Grand Canal.

The couple had two children: a boy, Heaton Vorse, born in 1901 and, after the couple moved to Provincetown in 1906, a girl, Mary Vorse Jr., born in 1907. On June 14, 1910, Bert died of a cerebral hemorrhage.

In 1912, Vorse married the journalist Joe O'Brien, a socialist and fellow suffragist from Virginia. In 1914 the couple had a child, Joel. The following year, the boy's father died of stomach cancer, and Vorse was again a single mother.

== Activist and journalist ==
=== Lawrence textile strike ===
Vorse had met O'Brien during the 1912 textile strike in Lawrence, Massachusetts. Barbara Ehrenreich dates the beginning of Vorse's activist writing to the horrors of the Triangle Shirtwaist Factory fire which she witnessed the year before just blocks from her home in Greenwich Village. But in her 1934 autobiography, A Footnote to Folly, Vorse identifies the Lawrence strike as the turning point in her life.

The Industrial Workers of the World (IWW), the "Wobblies", with Elizabeth Gurley Flynn and "Big" Bill Haywood as their principal agents, had shown that a largely female and immigrant workforce could organize. Then a fifteen-year-old mill hand, Fred Beal recalled that, against all expectations, it was the least regarded of the immigrant groups that sustained the strike over two bitterly cold winter months: "the Italians, Poles, Syrians and Franco-Belgians". As she reported for Harper's Magazine on this inter-ethnic solidarity in which women, beaten and arrested, played a leading role, Vorse reflected:

I entered into a way of life I never yet have left. . . . Before Lawrence, I had known a good deal about labor, but I had not felt about it. I had not got angry. In Lawrence I got angry. . . . Some curious synthesis had taken place between my life and that of the workers, some peculiar change that would never again permit me to look with indifference on the fact that riches for the few were made by the misery of the many.

It was in Lawrence that she, and O'Brien, "realized what we must do, that we could make one contribution -- that of writing the workers' story":

We realized, too, that all the laws made for the betterment of workers' lives have their origin with the workers. Hours are shortened, wages go up, conditions are better -- only if the workers protest. We wanted to work with them and write about them. We wanted to break through the silence and isolation which surrounded the workers' lives until everyone understood the conditions under which cloth was made, as we had been made aware.

In the winter of 1913–1914, they supported the Wobblies in a protest movement on behalf of New York City's quarter of a million unemployed. When mass arrests followed the tactic (initiated by a young Frank Tannenbaum) of invading churches with demands of food and shelter, it was at Vorse's apartment on East 11th Street, that Elizabeth Gurley Flynn, Bill Haywood, Carlo Tresca, and others organized a defense committee.

=== "Heterodite" and suffragist ===
In Greenwich Village, to which she had moved after Bert's death, she became a charter member of the Heterodoxy, a community of feminists who had largely met as suffrage workers, among them Elizabeth Gurley Flynn, Crystal Eastman, Inez Milholland, Susan Glaspell, Neith Boyce, Sara Josephine Baker, and Ida Rauth. By the end of 1910, she was a district chair of the New York City Woman Suffrage Party. In 1913, while on a magazine assignment in Europe to write a series of articles on the development of the Montessori method of education, she was party's delegate to the conference of the International Woman Suffrage Alliance in Budapest.

Unlike Carrie Chapman Catt and others in the party (whose suffrage referendum in 1917 was to result in New York becoming the first eastern state to grant women the ballot), she applauded the direct action tactics associated in Britain with the Pankhursts. To a friend she wrote, "I cannot imagine anything that would affect better the moral health of any country than something which would blast the greatest number of that indecent, immoral institution – the perfect lady – out of doors and set them smashing and rioting".

=== Feminist opposition to the war ===
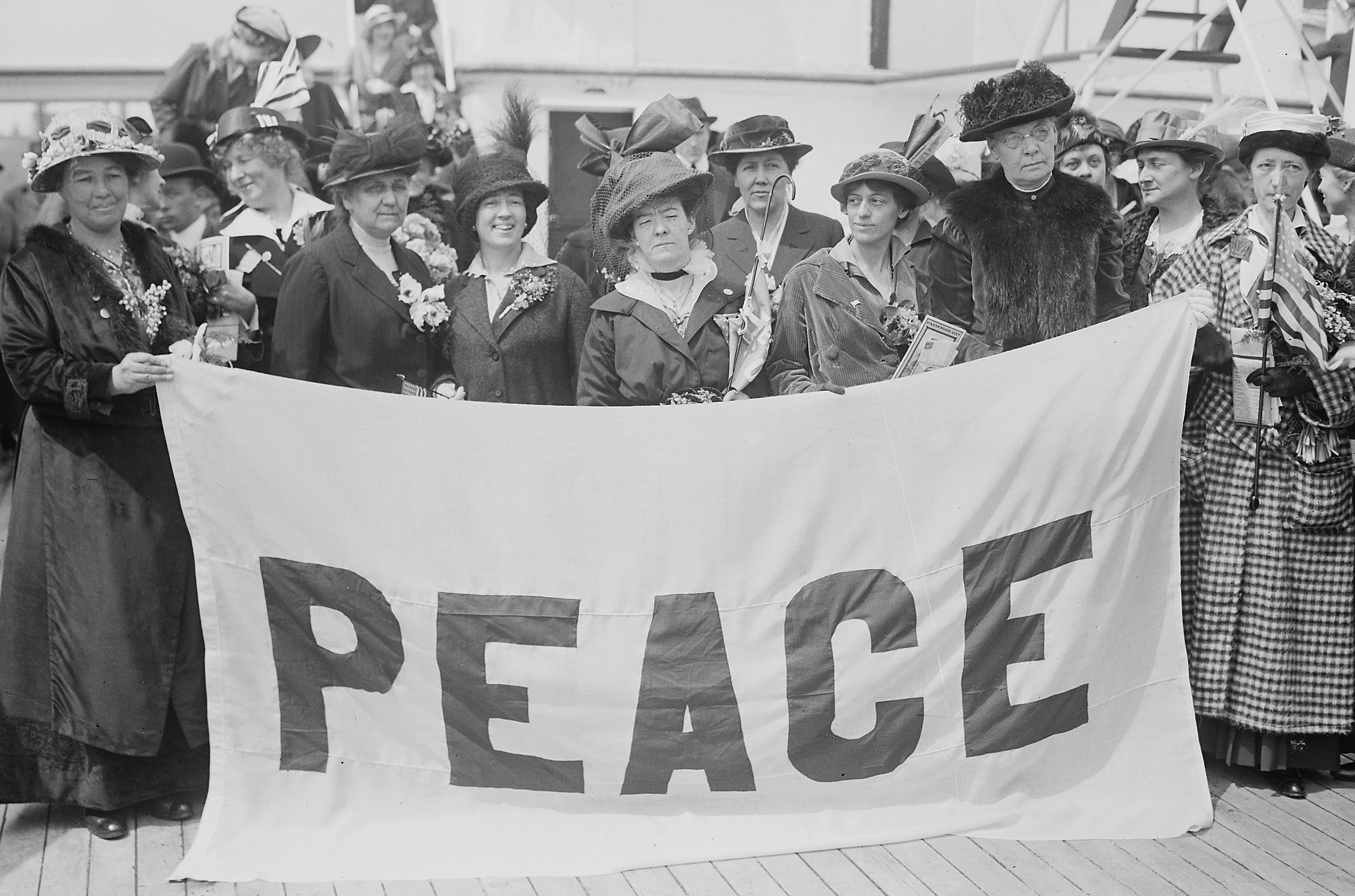
Vorse with American delegates to the April 1915 International Women's Peace Congress in The Hague.

After war broke out in Europe, together with Catt, Alice Hamilton, Lillian Wald, Florence Kelley, and other "Heterodites", she formed the Woman's Peace Party. In April 1915 the party sent her back across the Atlantic, as one of over 1000 delegates attending the International Congress of Women at The Hague. The Congress led to the creation of the Women's International League for Peace and Freedom (WILPF).

In Europe, Vorse had seen soldiers laughing and drinking on trains carrying them to places where they would kill and be killed. In her diary she wrote: ‘‘There is that which makes man his own enemy and every woman’s. Man takes passionate joy in risking his own life while he takes the life of others. When women’s understanding of this becomes conscious, it is called feminism."

When later she reported from Europe, she ignored political and diplomatic events, focusing rather on the impact of the war on the civilian population, especially women and children. In June 1919 she was back in Budapest, one of the few American reporters to visit Béla Kun's short-lived Communist government in Hungary. Reaching the Soviet Union several weeks before the male reporters from the great American dailies were admitted, she was Moscow correspondent for the Hearst papers during 1921.

=== Suspect radical ===
Hounded all the way by agents of the Department of Justice, she returned home to report on the campaign to free American political prisoners incarcerated during the Red Scare. She also began, regularly, to produce articles on child labor, infant mortality, labor disputes and working-class housing for several newspapers including New York Post and New York World

In November 1919, the Thiel Detective Agency, an anti-union group for hire, informed the Department of Justice that Vorse, along with several anarchists, Wobblies, communists, and AFL leaders, had met in Chicago to advance plans under the leadership of John Reed to overthrow the U.S. government. Vorse was not detained and questioned, but her activities became the subject of weekly and monthly reports to J. Edgar Hoover.

In the January 1921 edition of The Liberator (edited by Crysta and Max Eastman) she reported on the fate of "more than one thousand . . . I.W.W. class -war prisoners" and, among those facing lengthy prison sentences, recorded interviews with Haywood, Ralph Chaplin, George Hardy, and Vincent St. John. She concluded that there was but one law in America you break invariably at your own peril: "Do not attack the profit system".

Interest in Vorse peaked as a result of her relationship with the radical political cartoonist and Communist Party functionary Robert Minor and their engagement on behalf of the death-row anarchists Sacco and Vanzetti. Minor helped produce the first Sacco and Vanzetti defense pamphlet, and Vorse, who saw their case as testimony to "the unalterable determination of the employers to smash the workers", was first to bring it to the attention of the American Civil Liberties Union.

=== Disillusion with the Soviet Union ===
A trip to the Soviet Union in 1919 convinced Minor that Lenin and Trotsky had established "a complete monopoly of news, fact and opinion" in order to silence the "more radical revolutionaries ... behind the dark cloak of secrecy." Vorse shared Minor's critical opinion of Bolshevik terror. She likened Lenin's true believers to religious fanatics. She wrote Minor in 1920:

The peculiar stern gloom of the Communist state ... is not alone the result of blockade and war. It is part and parcel of these people who think that they and they alone have the truth, and who also think they have all the truth there is... . The Communists are the chosen people and they have all the insufferable qualities which God’s elect and anointed have always had.

Yet, within a few months after joining her in her Provincetown home, Minor reversed himself. The failure of the world revolution, apparent by 1920, in Minor's view made more splendid the triumph of the proletariat in Russia, and Minor was to serve until his death in 1952 as a loyal partisan of Soviet state policy. From that point, Vorse recalls that "Minor always called me bourgeois" and, only because he never thought "her fit for it", never pressured her to become a Communist Party member.

There were other aspects of Minor's outlook and behavior, consistent with his adoption of the Moscow party line, that by 1923 Vorse found no longer tolerable. To her diary she confided that it required of her "something full of effort" to endure his single-minded concentration on revolutionary politics, to the exclusion of most all other enjoyment in living. The American Communist Party, Vorse wrote in her journal, was headed by functionaries with "closed minds, so certain, so dull ... miserable, pathetic, static. They bore me, bore me, bore me."

In 1922 her affair with Minor ended when, four months pregnant with his child, she suffered a miscarriage, and he deserted her for the socialist illustrator Lydia Gibson, "a younger, more politically compliant woman". She recovered from the depression and heavy drinking that followed in Mexico City where she joined the colony of American writers and artists that had assembled around the writer Carleton Beals and was friend and mentor to Dorothy Day, who later embraced the Catholic Worker Movement.

In the early 1930s, Vorse recorded the rise of Hitler in Germany and the consolidation of Stalin's power in the USSR. Vorse was clear that the Soviet Union was a betrayal of her socialist ideals. What horrified her most was the state's attack on the Russian peasantry, starved into submission in the wake of Stalin's forced collectivization. She wrote in her diary, in early 1931:

I find myself in a bourgeois frame of mind about the kulaks. [The peasants] for the fault of having a wrong psychology have been killed or sent to forced labor. The moment you get any large group living in virtual slavery (and for ideological reasons) the world should say, "Why bathe humanity in blood if we still have to keep enslaved a considerable number of people so that the new civilization can march?" ... Who cares which class rules so long as the sum of injustice remains the same?

Later that year she added: "I am a communist because I don't see anything else to be. But I am a communist who hates Communists and Communism."

=== Chronicler of labor's struggle and racist injustice ===
Vorse had continued reporting on labor unrest during the war. For the New York City weekly, The Outlook, she covered the efforts of the IWW in the summer of 1916 to coordinate a strike of iron ore miners on the Mesabi Iron Range. In November 1916, Alexander Berkman's anarchist journal The Blast (San Francisco) carried her report on a bloody wildcat strike (four workers killed, hundreds wounded) at the Rockefeller-owned oil refineries in Bayonne, New Jersey.

After the war, labor engaged her both as a reporter and as an activist. She was publicity director for the Passaic, New Jersey, textile strike of 1926 and in 1929 witnessed the onset of the southern textile war in Gastonia, North Carolina. In 1931, monitoring the Coal War in Harlan County, with Edmund Wilson and Malcolm Cowley she was run out of Kentucky by nightriders. In 1932 she covered the Farmers Holiday Association strike and the Scottsboro Boys' appeal. On December 2, the front page of the Washington Post featured a letter to President Herbert Hoover she had signed with Sherwood Anderson, Theodore Dreiser, Malcolm Cowley, Waldo Frank, Robert Morse Lovett, and Edmund Wilson pleading with the government not to respond with violence to the unemployed marching on the city.

In the spring of 1933, in two pieces for The New Republic, she covered the case of the Scottsboro Boys, nine African American teenagers convicted in a rushed and irregular trial in Alabama for the alleged rape of two young white women on a freight train. In explaining "How Scottsboro Happened", she wrote that the case was "not simply one of race hatred. It arose from the life that was followed by both accusers and accused, girls and boys, white and black", lives "dreary and without hope" and in which virtue was never seen to be rewarded "with anything but work and insecurity."

Later that same year, her old Greenwich Village friend John Collier, the controversial New Deal commissioner of Indian Affairs, hired her as publicity director for the Indian Bureau and editor of Indians at Work, the Bureau's in-house, biweekly journal. Author of the Indian Reorganization Act of 1934, Collier rejected the policy of inducing Indians to abandon their tribal heritage and assimilate into white society. While in early New Deal Washington, she associated for a time with members of the Ware group, a covert network of Communists later fated to receive wide attention for their connection to the Alger Hiss case.

In 1937, Vorse was in Flint, Michigan, for the pivotal "sit-down strike" of the CIO's United Auto Workers, and, as chronicled in her book Labor's New Millions (1938). Writing about them for The New Republic, she may have been "the only reporter who gravitated toward the Women’s Emergency Brigade, a coalition of striking women workers and strikers’ wives who raised hell on the picket lines". That same year, she went on to report on the Little Steel Strike. This saw the CIO embrace black workers; women holding the picket lines under gun fire; and, at the Republic Steel plant in south Chicago plant, the killing of 23 protestors in the Memorial Day Massacre. Vorse, then 63, was hit by a ricocheting bullet, and a picture of her pale, bloodied, face was featured in nation’s Sunday newspapers.

By the end of the 1930s she could count among the titles for which she had written: the New York Post, New York World, The Washington Post, McCall's, Harper's Weekly, Atlantic Monthly, The Masses (suppressed in 1917 for its opposition to conscription), New Masses, Common Sense, The New Republic, McClure's, Survey, The Delineator, and Ladies' Home Journal as well as various news services.

During the Second World War, she was one of America's oldest war reporters. Focusing as she had in the First World War on the plight of civilians, she was moved to do extensive work for United Nations Refugee and Resettlement Agency, UNRRA. After the War, she continued working into her eighties. In 1952, she exposed in Harper’s the political and labor corruption involved in the Gambino crime family's control the Brooklyn dockyards, complete with an interview with their hiring boss, vice-president of the International Longshoremen's Association, Tony "Bang Bang" Anastasio. She made her last major investigative trip in 1959, reporting on anti-union violence during a textile strike in Henderson, North Carolina.

=== Provincetown Players ===
In 1915, on her property in Provincetown, Massachusetts, Vorse helped stage the first performance of a repertoire that included Ida Rauh, Susan Glaspell, George Cram Cook, John Reed, Hutchins Hapgood, and Eugene O'Neill. Once established the Provincetown Players moved to Greenwich Village, in November 1918 opening their own Provincetown Playhouse with O'Neill's one-act play Where the Cross Is Made.

== Fiction writer ==
=== Emancipated heroines ===
Vorse had published her first short story in a local newspaper at the age of sixteen. With Albert Vorse's encouragement, at the age of 29 she found herself reeling off short magazine fiction "like a regular phonograph"—typically stories of rugged and energetic heroines who managed to win the affection of a coveted male over a more constrained and conventionally feminine rival. Beginning with The Breaking-In of a Yachtsman’s Wife (1908), her first novels drew on the experiences of her first years of marriage. They blame not only men for failing to understand women, but also women for embracing their own subservience, whether to husbands or to children. Her 1911 novel The Very Little Person emphasizes how little middle-class men were expected to know about children and about women's maternal experiences when a young father is bewildered by the affection he feels for his daughter. The Autobiography of an Elderly Woman, also published in 1911 is a portrait of the pleasures, regrets, and grievances of a middle-class grandmother who fights daily to be her own person.

At this time, Vorse also wrote several ghost stories, including "The Second Wife" (1912). The stories were later collected in the Ash-Tree Press volume Sinister Romance : Collected ghost stories.

Vorse's 1915 novel I’ve Come To Stay: A Love Comedy of Bohemia employs "blue serge lining"—a reference to the fabric that protected the inside of tailored coats and suits, forming a barrier between the self and the world—as a metaphor in the struggle of her heroine to break free of a stultifying bourgeois upbringing. Camilla embraces the bohemian culture of Greenwich Village complete with anarchist friends and a Polish violinist lover and rejects the suit of her neighbor, the equally middle-class Ambrose Ingraham, for fear that he will once again wrap her up in blue serge. She describes the excesses of life in the village as an embrace of the "unfulfilled joys which died unborn in our parents' souls" and as casting away of "decencies in our endeavor not to be hypocritical."

=== Collaborative novels ===
Vorse worked on two collaborative, or composite, novels organized by the active suffragist and editor of Harper's Bazaar, Elizabeth Jordan. In 1907 Vorse was one of a dozen authors—among them Henry James and William Dean Howells—who each contributed a chapter to The Whole Family, a multi-generational saga first serialized in Jordan's magazine and then published by Harper's as a book in 1908. The project was originally conceived by Howells as a showpiece of his brand of literary realism but his vision for the book was disrupted by the agency the women writers insisted on giving the female characters.

In 1917, along with thirteen other authors ready to donate the royalties to the suffragist cause, including Fannie Hurst, Dorothy Canfield Fisher, Alice Duer Miller, Ethel Watts Mumford, Henry Kitchell Webster and William Allen White, Vorse collaborated again with Jordan in The Sturdy Oak. The novel was serialized in Collier's Weekly. and then published as a novel by Henry Holt & Company in 1917. Set in upstate New York, it anticipates the state's 1917 referendum on women's suffrage. Idealistic reformers are pitted against a ruthless political machine, and the traditional picture of man as "the sturdy oak" supporting woman, "the clinging vine", is ridiculed,

=== Strike! ===
With the exception of The Ninth Man (1918), a novel set in 12th-century Italy, her subsequent book-length publications drew on her radical journalism. They vary from compilations recording her coverage of actual events, such as Men and Steel (1920), The Passaic Textile Strike, 1926-1927 (1927), and Labor's New Millions (1938), to novels: Second Cabin (1928) based on her homeward voyage from inflation-ravaged postwar Germany and post-revolutionary Russia. and Strike (1930).

Strike! was the first of several "Gastonia novels" by different writers inspired by the Loray Mill strike of 1929. In Gastonia, North Carolina, Fred Beal led the Communist Party's National Textile Workers' Union in a first effort to organize in the union-free South. His counterpart in the novel, Fer Deane, under constant threat of assassination leaves much of the work to Irma Rankin and the chief protagonist Mamie Lewes, characters recognizable as Beal's assistants Vera Buch Weisbord and Ella May Wiggins.

Lewes, like Wiggins, is a working women, a single mother, and the balladeer of the movement. While at the center of the "maternal solidarity" that maintains the strike, she contends on all sides with male presumption. She resists Deane's demand that he be given direction of a strike in which it is the women who "man" the dangerous picket lines, and tires of a middle-class Communist-Party activist from the north who befriends her partly, it seems, for the pleasure of hearing himself lecture. The murder of Wiggins preceded a final police descent upon the strikers' tent city that, in turn, leads to Beal and five co-defendants being convicted of second-degree murder in the death of the local police chief. In the novel (completed before Beal and his co-defendants skipped bail and escaped to the Soviet Union) the death of Lewes leads to the decisive martyrdom of an otherwise indecisive Deane: he joins in the final act of resistance and, with five other men, is killed.

For ten years, from 1932 to 1942, Vorse was a regular short-story contributor to The New Yorker.

== Awards ==
Four years before her death in 1966, the 88-year-old Vorse entered the silver jubilee banquet of the United Auto Workers, accompanied by union leader Walter Reuther. There, she received the first UAW Social Justice Award, with former First Lady Eleanor Roosevelt and novelist Upton Sinclair looking on to share her honor. Vorse was feted for her work as one of the most important labor journalists of the 1920s and 1930s.

== Death and legacy ==
Vorse died of a heart attack on June 14, 1966, at her home in Provincetown, Massachusetts, on the extreme tip of Cape Cod, where she was buried. She was 92 years old.

In addition to her memoir written in 1935, Vorse participated in an oral history project at Columbia University in 1957, an interview that was transcribed and microfilmed by the university. In 1966, her children Heaton Vorse, Mary Ellen Boyden, and Joel O'Brien, deposited their mother's papers with the Archives of Labor History and Urban Affairs, Walter P. Reuther Library, Wayne State University, in Detroit. The collection covers the period from 1841 to 1966. The rich documentary record of her personal life that she normally maintained is missing for the early 1920s. It is possible that she found a record of this time—a period marked by her affair with Robert Minor and her absence from her children—too painful to preserve. She may also have nursed a lingering fear of red baiting. In her autobiography, Vorse described herself, simply, as "a woman who in early life got angry because many children lived miserably and died needlessly."

John Dos Passos, a longtime friend of Vorse's who owned a Provincetown house not far from hers, is said to have drawn on "her quality of willed self-creation" when he invented Mary French, an ill-fated labor organizer in The Big Money, the third volume of his U.S.A. trilogy.

In 2020, Vorse's Provincetown house, to which she dedicated a chapter in her 1942 memoir Time and the Town: A Provincetown Chronicle was restored. With the agreement of her granddaughters, the 18th century eight-bedroom property has been rededicated as a community arts center.

== Timeline of journalism and political activity ==
Compiled from notes to the Mary Heaton Vorse Collection at Wayne State University and from Dee Garrison's biography.

1910: New York City Women's Suffrage Party, district chair. Campaign to reduce the city's infant mortality rate.

1911: Triangle Shirtwaist Factory fire, New York City.

1912: Lawrence Textile Strike for Harper's Weekly.

1913: Budapest: International Woman Suffrage Convention (delegate and reporter).

1914: Unemployment protest movement, New York City.

1915: The Hague: International Congress of Woman. Holland, France, Germany, Switzerland, England: war correspondent, covering the effects of war on civil populations.

1916: Mesabi Iron Range Strike. Minnesota, Michigan. Bayonne, New Jersey, oil refinery strikes.

1917–1918: Labor under wartime: working conditions, labor unrest, living conditions. Pamphlets on the rights of small nations (Poland, Czechoslovakia, Yugoslavia) for the Committee on Public Information.

1918–1919: Europe. England, France, Germany, Italy, Austria, Hungary, Czechoslovakia, Yugoslavia. Publicity for the Red Cross, the Balkan Commission, and the American Relief Administration. Articles and news stories; studies of postwar conditions in industrial areas.

1919: Switzerland. International Socialist Conference (Berne International); steel strikes Pittsburgh, Homestead, and Braddock. Weekly newspaper stories and publicity releases for the Steel Workers Organizing Committee.

1920: Sacco and Vanzetti case.

1920–1921: Amalgamated Clothing Workers. Organizational drive; lockout.

1921: Palmer Raids.

1921–1922: Soviet Russia: political conditions, famine.

1922–1923: Trial of syndicalists in Michigan.

1926–1927: Passaic textile strike, New Jersey

1929: Loray Mill Strike, Gastonìa, North Carolina.

1931–1932: The Harlan County Coal War, Kentucky. The rise of Hitler. Stalin's collectivization.

1932: Farmers Holiday Association. Hunger March on Washington

1933: Scottsboro retrial. Austria, England, Germany. The London Economic Conference. The rise of Hitler.

1935–1936: Office of Indian Affairs. Editor of Indians at Work.

1936–1937: C.I.O. organizational drives in various industries: automobile, steel, textiles, etc.

1937: UAW sit-down strikes, Flint, Michigan. The Little Steel Strike, Youngstown, Pennsylvania

1939: France, Germany, Yugoslavia, the invasion of Poland.

1943: Extensive travels throughout the U.S.: labor and the civilian population during wartime.

1945–1947: Europe. Publicity for U.N.R.R.A.; freelance reporting. France, Germany, Greece, Italy, Yugoslavia

1949: Mexico. The Sinarquîstas.

1950: Reuther's Treaty of Detroit. White House Conference on Children and Youth.

1950–1954: Crime and corruption on New York–New Jersey waterfront.

1959: The Harriet-Henderson textile strike, Henderson, North Carolina.

== Published works ==
- The Breaking In of a Yacthtsman's Wife. Boston: Houghton, Mifflin and Co., 1908. —Fiction.
- The Whole Family; a Novel by Twelve Authors. (Contributor.) New York: Harper and Brothers, 1908. —Fiction.
- Autobiography of an Elderly Woman. Boston: Houghton, Mifflin and Co., 1911. —Fiction.
- The Very Little Person. Boston: Houghton Mifflin Co., 1911. —Fiction.
- The Heart's Country. Boston: Houghton Mifflin Co., 1914. —Fiction.
- The Sturdy Oak: A Composite Novel of American Politics by Fourteen American Authors. (Contributor.) New York: Henry Holt, 1917. —Fiction.
- I've Come to Stay: A Love Comedy of Bohemia. New York: The Century Co., 1918. —Fiction.
- The Prestons. New York: Boni and Liveright, 1918. —Fiction.
- Growing Up. New York: Boni and Liveright, 1920. —Fiction.
- Men and Steel. New York: Boni and Liveright, 1920.
- The Ninth Man: A Story. New York: Harper and Brothers, 1920. —Fiction.
- Wreckage: A Play in One Act. With Colin Clements. New York: D. Appleton, 1924.
- Fraycar's Fist. New York: Boni and Liveright, 1924. —Fiction.
- The Passaic Textile Strike, 1926-1927. Passaic, NJ: General Relief Committee of Textile Strikers 1927.
- Second Cabin. New York: Horace Liveright, 1928. —Fiction.
- Gastonia. n.c.: n.p., 1929.
- Strike! New York: Horace Liveright, 1930. —Fiction. [reprinted by University of Illinois Press, 1991]
- A Footnote to Folly: Reminiscences of Mary Heaton Vorse. New York: Farrar & Rinehart, 1935. —Memoir.
- Labor's New Millions. New York: Modern Age Books, 1938.
- Time and the Town: A Provincetown Chronicle. New York: Dial Press, 1942.
- America's Submerged Class: The Migrants. Cleveland, OH: National Consumers League, n.d. [c. 1953].
- Rebel Pen: The Writings of Mary Heaton Vorse. Dee Garrison, ed. New York: Monthly Review Press, 1985.
