= Ami Mali Hicks =

American artist, suffragist and writer

- Ami Mali Hicks, 1930
- Born: 1867; Brooklyn, New York
- Died: 1954 (aged 86–87)
- Occupations: Artist, Educator, Suffragist

Ami Mali Hicks (1867–1954) was an American feminist, writer, artist, and organizer. Hicks art focused on textiles and other crafts, among other mediums. Though she was tutored in the arts, much of her skill was gained through self study. In addition to her artwork, Hicks wrote books on art instruction and criticism. Hicks was a longtime administrator for Free Acres, an independent, collectivized community in New Jersey. She worked with the Women's Political Union and was a member of Heterodoxy, two radical organizations that challenged some of the more placid activism of women's movements and suffragists. She died in 1954.

== Early life ==
Ami Mali Hicks was born in 1867 in Brooklyn, New York to Josephine (née Mali) and George C. Hicks. Her maternal grandfather Hypolite Mali, was the Belgian consul to New York from 1840 until his death in 1883. She attended Miss Whitcomb's School and took art classes, studying with William Merritt Chase and Robert Henri. She studied portraiture in Paris under the artist Charles Chaplin.

== Career ==
=== Artistry ===
Around 1889, Hicks returned to New York City and began working at the Baynes Mosaic-Tracery Company making designs for metalwork. Simultaneously she continued her studies at the School of Artist Artisans on West Twenty-third Street to learn wallpaper design and book-cover designing, also teaching metalwork at the school. In 1892, one of her stencil designs was chosen to adorn the frieze of the assembly room for the Woman's Building at the World's Columbian Exposition the following year. Hicks' stencil design consisted of a pine motif, of which she maintain ownership, having only allowed the use of her work at the fair. She sold wall paper designs and made metal tracery patterns for Tiffany Glass and Decorating Company, but found she was unable to financially support herself without taking on additional work as a director of art works at the Lotus Press and several other printing houses. She supervised the printing of menus, programs, cards and bookplates, as well as creating the designs to be printed. By 1903, she had expanded her classes and was teaching design at the Guild of Arts and Crafts for which she served as financial secretary. In 1906, Hicks and other artisans formed the National Society of Craftsmen and she was elected to serve a three-year term as a director on the board.

Hicks began to focus on batik and exhibited pieces at the Second Annual Exhibition of the National Arts Club in 1908, where her wall hanging was praised for her use of color. She began experimenting with dyes, often creating her own combinations to match decorations for home decor. Hicks was passionate about the use of vivid color, using both her own dyes and others, Hicks made use of various techniques when dyeing fabric to assure the presence of intense color, one of which being the wax resist technique. By blocking out spaces on the cloth with wax the spaces saturated with wax do not take in dye, allowing Hicks to create unique designs. Another technique that Hicks made use of when dyeing fabrics consisted of dyeing the fabric twice while the fabric was still wet and blending multiple colors together. The creation of color combinations was often achieved through the blending of analogous colors. Materials that Hicks practiced fabric dyeing on consisted of hand-woven and braided mats, curtains, water-color sketches, scarves, and silks. Hicks often took to her farm in New Jersey when making her hand dyed pieces. Though Hicks continued to produce batiks, she also made woven works, draperies, and produced watercolors influenced by Japanese styles. She began to publish books and articles on arts and crafts, including such works as "Batik, Its Making and Its Use" (House & Garden (November 1913), The Craft of Handmade Rugs (1914), Everyday Art (1925), and Color in Action (1937). In 1919, she joined the faculty of a theatrical school run by Yvette Guilbert and was responsible for teaching costume and scenery design.

=== Activism ===
Aside from her art, Hicks also took interest in political activism. Specifically, she was active in the women's suffrage movement, joining the militant Women's Political Union led by Harriet Stanton Blatch and the Heterodoxy Club. She was described by a friend as a "forbidding feminist". Hicks was among the women who demanded that President Woodrow Wilson stop imprisoning suffragettes. Additionally, she was a member of the Committee of One Thousand. Hicks was also involved with the Single Tax Issue, speaking about the matter with the Equal Franchise Society and Woman's Christian Temperance Union. In 1913, she wrote an article about many of the women who were also part of the organization.

=== Free Acres ===
Hicks' longest standing organization is Free Acres. In 1909, she joined with Bolton Hall, an ardent member of the Henry George Movement, to establish a single tax colony on a piece of farmland he owned. The goal of the colony was to establish a community for those who could not afford a summer home to share the property and work together for improvements. Hall converted the hen house to a dwelling for his private use and Hicks and Ella Murray made use of the dilapidated farm house. The group sent out invitations to other Georgists and by 1910, the three were joined by Grace Isabell Colburn, Walter Hampton, Otto G. Fischer and his wife. The group drafted the incorporation papers, stating that members were allowed to build in the community but forbidden to buy or sell the land. Land rents were annually collected and the corporation paid the various taxes due. Hicks was elected as one of the first trustees and continued to serve in that capacity throughout the 1930s, as well as participating in events of the Henry George School. She retired near the property in 1940, being one of the two living original members in the 1950s.
