= His Woman =

1931 film

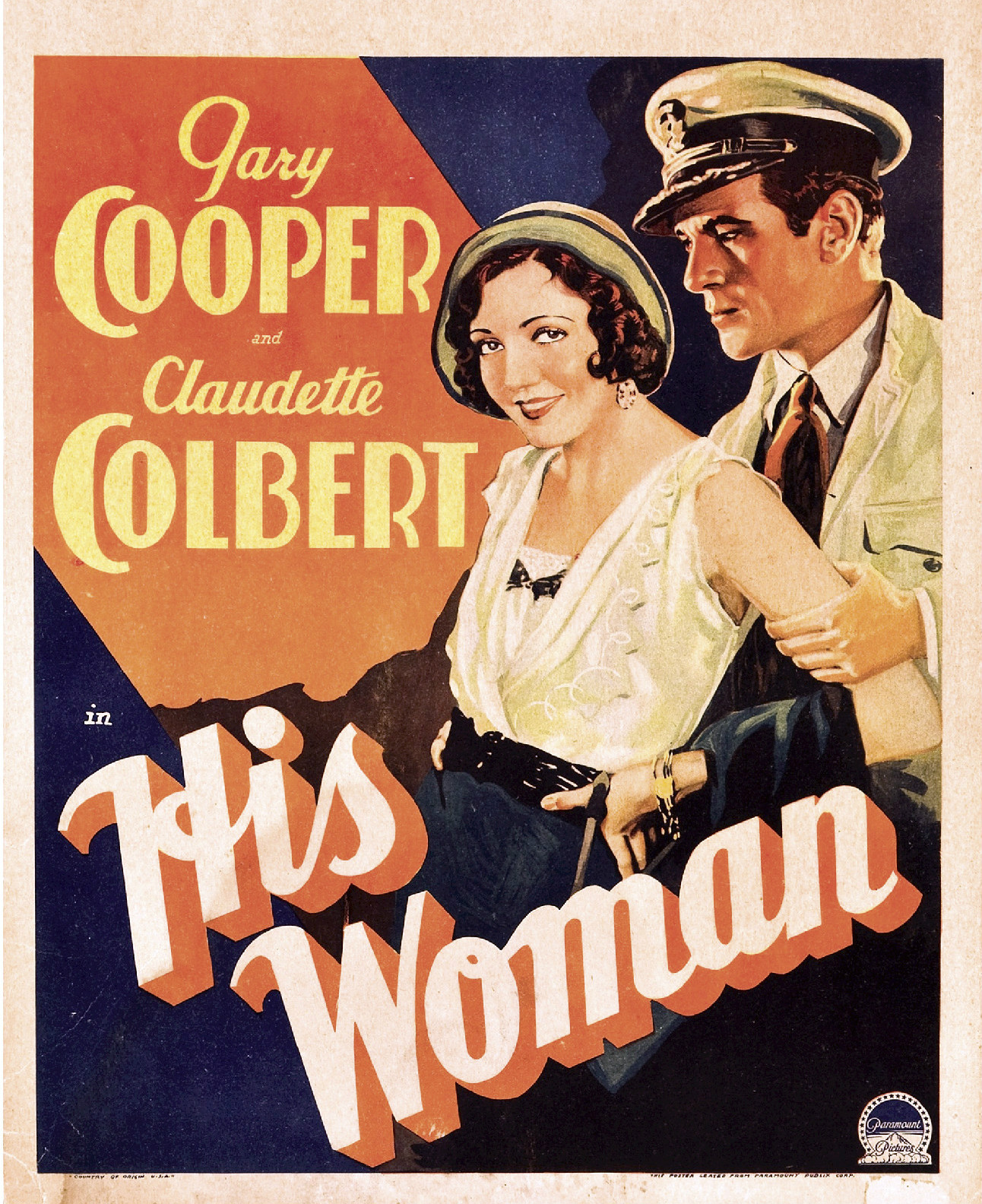
- Theatrical release poster
- Directed by: Edward Sloman
- Screenplay by: Melville Baker; Adelaide Heilbron
- Based on: The Sentimentalists (novel) by Dale Collins
- Starring: Gary Cooper; Claudette Colbert
- Cinematography: William O. Steiner
- Edited by: Arthur Ellis
- Production company: Paramount Pictures
- Distributed by: Paramount Pictures
- Release date: November 21, 1931 (USA)
- Running time: 76 minutes
- Country: United States
- Language: English

His Woman is a 1931 American pre-Code romance drama film directed by Edward Sloman and starring Gary Cooper and Claudette Colbert. Based on the novel The Sentimentalists by Dale Collins, the story is about a tough sea captain who discovers a baby aboard his freighter and hires a tramp, masquerading as a missionary's daughter, to care for the infant on their passage to New York.

It is a remake of the 1928 film Sal of Singapore. The 1931 film was a modest commercial success at the time.

== Plot ==
While docked in a Caribbean port aboard a third-rate freighter, Captain Sam Whalan gets involved in a drunken brawl in a seedy tavern. Returning to the ship, Sam discovers that a baby boy, rescued from a drifting Navy boat, has been left for an unnamed sailor aboard his ship. Deciding to adopt the child himself, Sam advertises for a "mother" and soon hires Sally Clark as the child's nanny in exchange for her passage to New York. Sally tells him she is the daughter of a recently deceased missionary. Unknown to Sam, Sally is actually a dance hall girl dressed to appear virtuous and proper.

During the voyage, Sally takes loving care of the child while Sam protects her from the lusty sailors on board. One night, the first mate, Gatson, recognizes Sally from a dance hall and tries to blackmail her into sleeping with him. Sally struggles to reject his advances, and Sam comes to her rescue. In the ensuing struggle, Gatson falls overboard. Unable to locate him in the dense fog, he is assumed dead. By the time they arrive in New York, Sam and Sally have fallen in love and intend to marry. The Department of Commerce, however, calls Sam to testify in an investigation of the Gatson incident, and he is soon arrested.

Sam and Sally are surprised to learn that Gatson survived, was picked up by a cruise ship, and is now pressing charges against Sam for assault and attempted murder. In the course of the investigation, in order to clear Sam of the charges, Sally is forced to reveal her sordid past as a dance hall girl. Shocked and disappointed by the revelation, Sam tells Sally to leave the ship, and decides to put the baby up for adoption, despite Sally's sincere protests. After sending his assistant Aloysius to deliver Sally's luggage, Sam goes off drinking with Gatson.

Later that night, a vengeful Sam brings Gatson to Sally's apartment to insult her. When she learns from another sailor that the baby was left out in the rain and is now sick, she immediately comes to care for the infant with the help of a doctor. Sam postpones his next sailing mission until the child's fever breaks and he begins to recover. By the time the baby is well and the ship pulls up anchor, Sam and Sally have made amends and renew their plans to marry.

== Cast ==
- Gary Cooper as Captain Sam Whalan
- Claudette Colbert as Sally Clark
- Averell Harris as Mate Gatson
- Richard Spiro as Sammy
- Douglass Dumbrille as Alisandroe
- Raquel Davidovich as Maria Estella
- Hamtree Harrington as Aloysius
- Sidney Easton as Mark
- Joan Blair as Gertrude
- Charlotte Wynters as Flo
- Herschel Mayall as Mrs. Morrisey
- Joseph Calleia as The Agent
- Lon Haschal as Captain of Schooner
- Harry Davenport as Customs Inspector
- John T. Doyle as Doctor

== Production ==
His Woman was filmed at Paramount-Publix New York Studios in Astoria, Long Island.
