= Vida Ravenscroft Sutton =

American dramatist (1878–1956)

Vida Ravenscroft Sutton (1878 — July 27, 1956) was an American playwright, voice teacher, and radio professional.

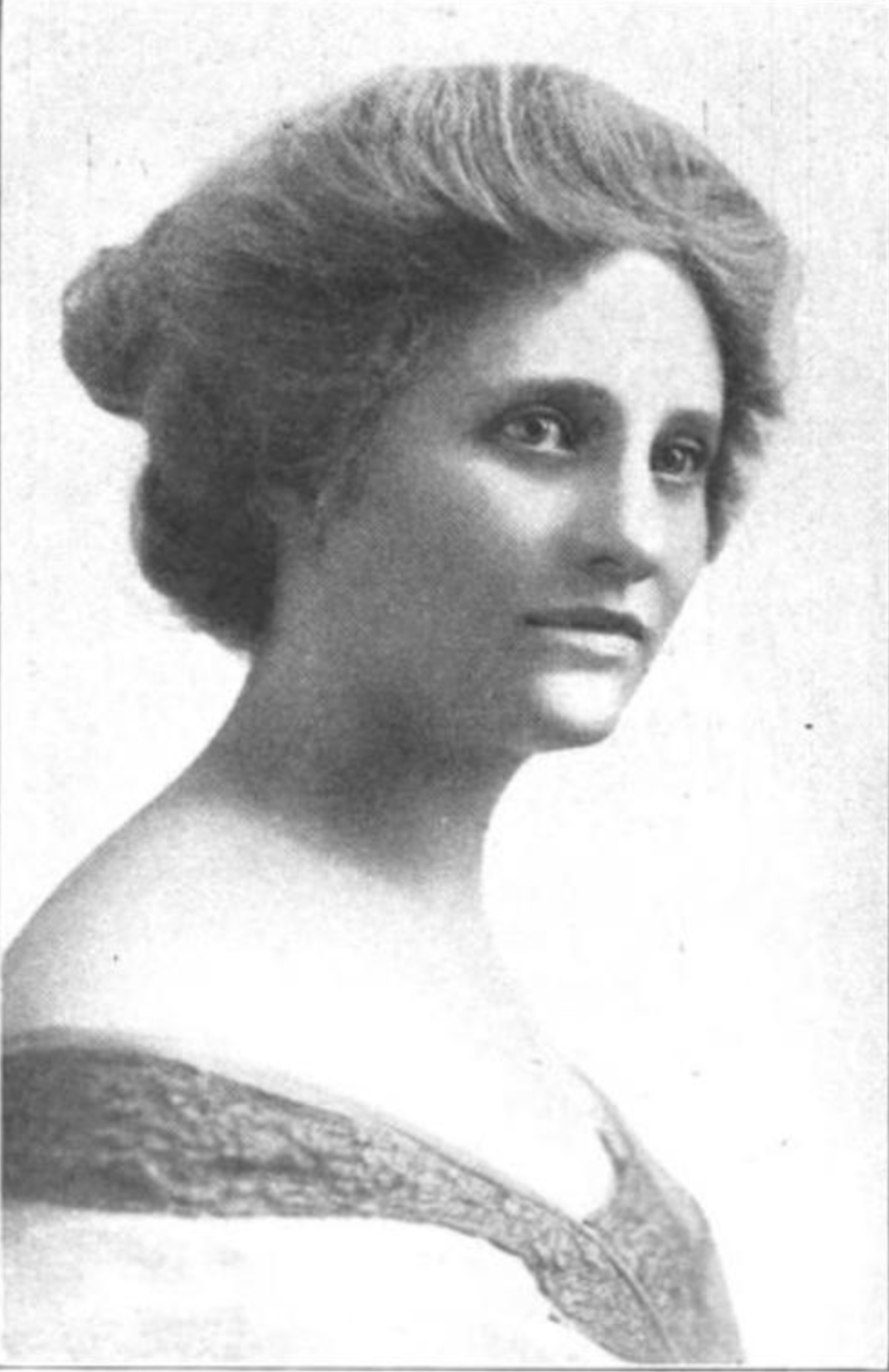
Sutton in 1912

== Early life and education ==
Vida Ravenscroft Sutton was born in 1878, in Oakland, California, and raised in Helena, Montana, the daughter of David M. Sutton and Mary Ravenscroft. She studied philosophy at the University of Chicago, graduating in 1903.

== Career ==
Sutton was a member of the New Theatre Company in New York City beginning in 1910, and performed as an actress and singer as a young woman. She wrote plays and pageants with mainly historical and biblical settings, intended for church and community groups. Titles of her works included Christ is Born in Bethlehem (1924), Pageant of the Fifteenth Century (1928), A Pageant of Women of the Sixteenth Century (1927),The Pilgrims' Holiday (1920), Wooings and Witches: A Shakespearean Medley (1925), A Masque of the Seventeenth Century (1927) and The Mantle of the Virgin (1921) She also co-wrote at least one play set in China, with Kyung Shien Sung (The Betrothal of Mai Tsung). Later in life she directed plays, and was the organizer and director of the small Onteora Playhouse at Tannersville, New York.

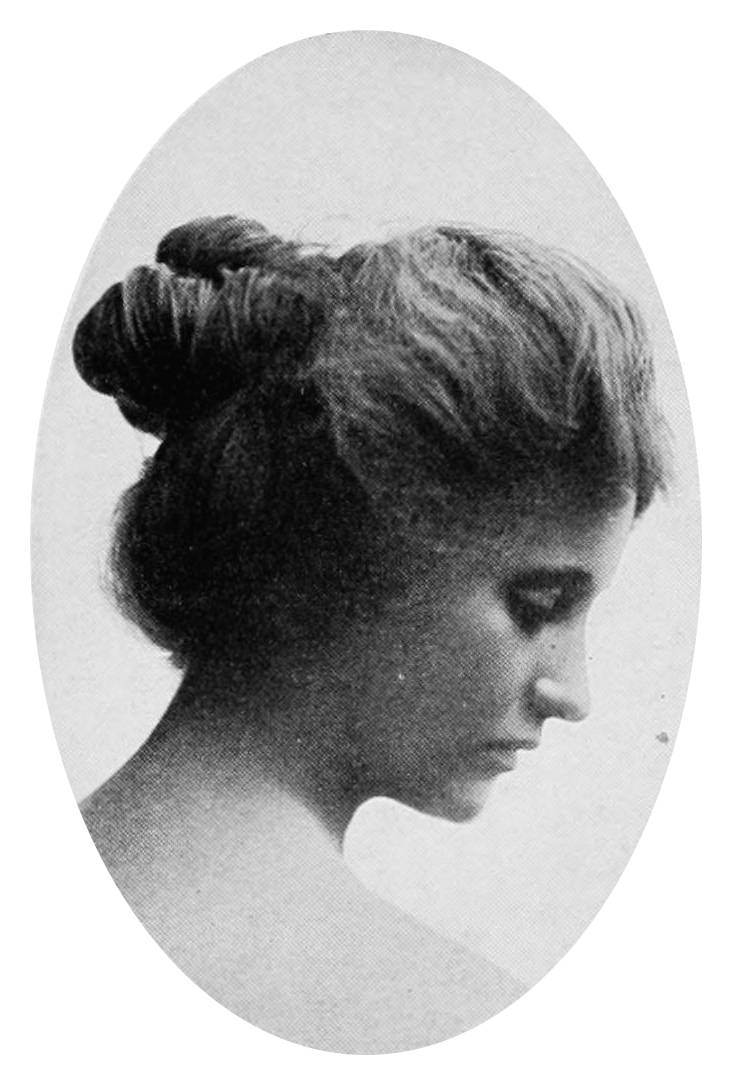

From 1929 to 1937, Sutton was director and presenter of the NBC radio program "The Magic of Speech", and spoke on gender and broadcasting. She wrote a book of the same name, The Magic of Speech: Studies in Spoken English (1936), and another on similar themes, Seeing and Hearing America: Studies in Spoken English and Group Speaking (1936). She also taught speech and diction to NBC on-air personnel in the 1930s. She was also head of the drama and speech department at the Finch School in New York for many years. In 1936, she was chair of the Radio Council for American Speech, which collaborated with the National Council of Teachers of English on public education programs.

Sutton was active on behalf of suffrage and a member of Heterodoxy, a women's debating club based in Greenwich Village. She wrote at least one suffrage play, Winning the Voter.

== Personal life and legacy ==
Sutton died on July 27, 1956, aged 77. Her unfinished manuscript about her father's Quaker upbringing and journey on the Oregon Trail in the 1860s was posthumously developed into a biography of David Sutton, by her nephew William R. Sutton, titled The Wind Blew Him West (Outskirts Press 2008).
