= Paula O. Jakobi =

American suffragist and playwright

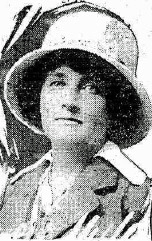
- Born: Paula Owen; 1870
- Died: July 12, 1960 (aged 89–90)
- Occupations: Playwright, Suffragist
- Spouse: Leo C. Jakobi

Paula O. Jakobi (1870 – July 12, 1960) was an American suffragist and playwright.

== Career and activism ==
Jakobi was a suffrage leader in New York City, affiliated with the National Woman's Party. She organized an event at Cooper Union in 1914, where Lincoln Steffens, Zona Gale, Edna Ferber and many other pro-suffrage authors gave readings and sold autographed books for the cause. Jakobi studied prison reform at the Massachusetts women's reformatory in Framingham, and wrote with urgency the lives of destitute women. She was also, for three years, the opera critic for a New York newspaper.

Jakobi was a member of Heterodoxy, a feminist club based in Greenwich Village. She and Heterodoxy founder Marie Jenney Howe wrote a satirical one-act play, Telling the Truth at the White House (1917), based on suffrage protests in Washington D. C. A few months after the play was published, Jakobi was arrested in November 1917 while protesting at the White House; she was sentenced to thirty days at Occoquan Workhouse. While at Occoquan, she refused food, and was force fed by prison officials. She described the experience in stark terms that were quoted in suffrage literature of the time, and for decades after:

"There was no light in the room, only one in the corridor. Three of us were thrown into every cell. There was a single bed in each room and a mattress on the floor. The floors were filthy as were the blankets. In the morning we were roughly told to get up. No facilities for washing were given us. Faint, ill, exhausted, we were ordered before the superintendent. It was eight o'clock and we had had no food since the preceding day at twelve. None had been offered us."

Jakobi wrote other short plays, including The President (1921), Poet of His People (1917), Donna Juanna (with Marie Jenney Howe, 1917), The Dragon's Tooth (1917), Chinese Lily (1915, set in a women's prison), and And Ye Gave Me a Stone (1915).

When she was in her eighties, Jakobi wrote a new play The Adamses (1952), about sharecroppers, which was produced by the Hedgerow Theatre near Philadelphia.

== Personal life ==
Paula Owen married Leo C. Jakobi, a manufacturer. They had two daughters, Audrey and Ruth. In 1904, Paula O. Jakobi was widowed after a long separation, when Leo died by suicide. She died on July 12, 1960.
