= Katherine Leckie =

Canadian-American journalist and activist (1860–1930)

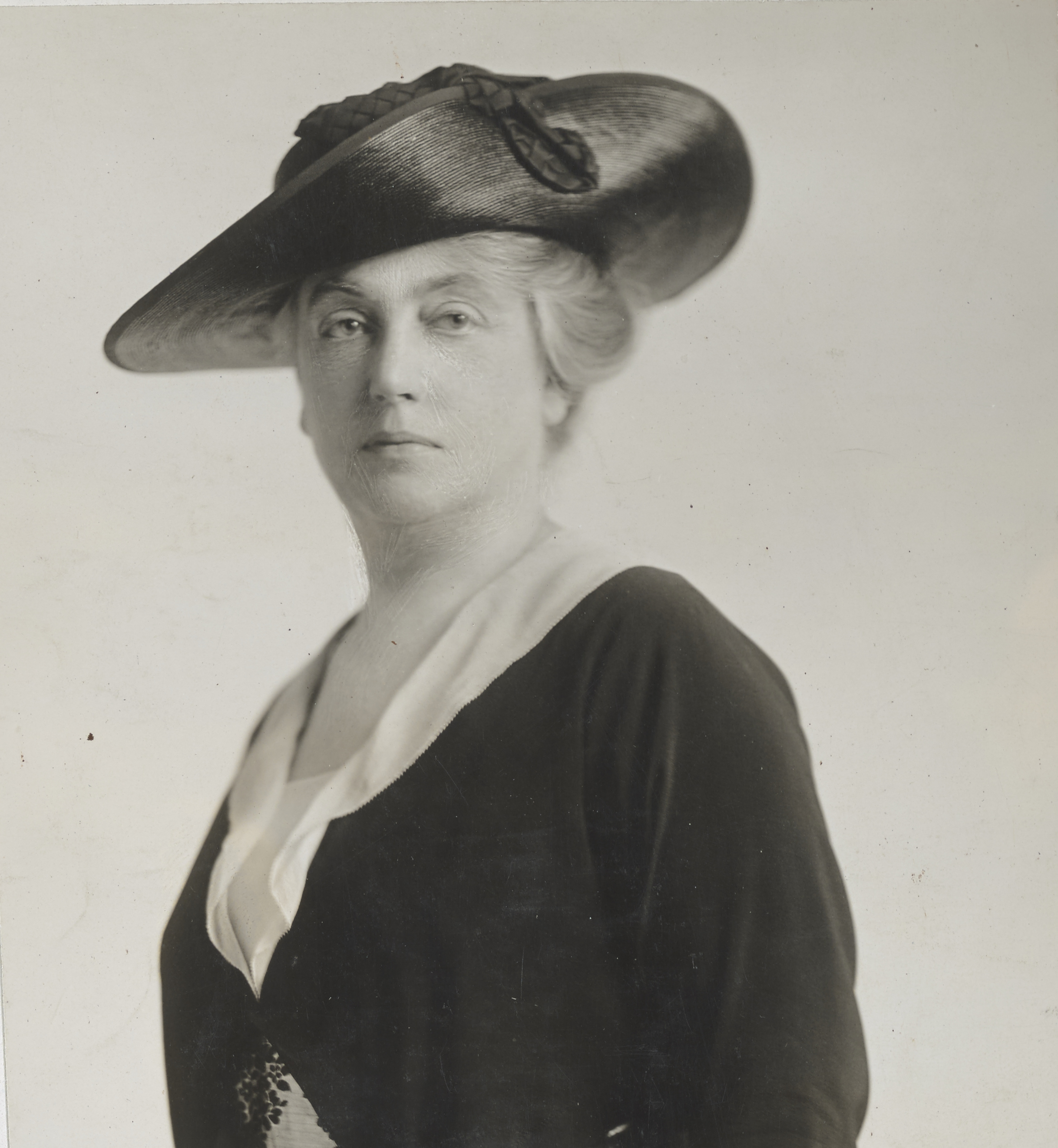
Katherine Leckie, star newspaper woman and publicity expert, city editor of Food Conservation Section of the Food Administration)

Katherine Leckie (1860 – July 22, 1930) was a Canadian-American journalist, editor, and active suffragist. She served as publicist for Rosika Schwimmer, was press agent for the Ford peace expedition of 1915–16, and worked for the United States Food Administration during World War I as a news editor.

== Early life and education ==
Katherine Leckie was born in Kingston, Canada West, daughter of William Alexander Leckie and Evalyn McKee Leckie. She was raised in Chicago, Illinois.

== Career ==
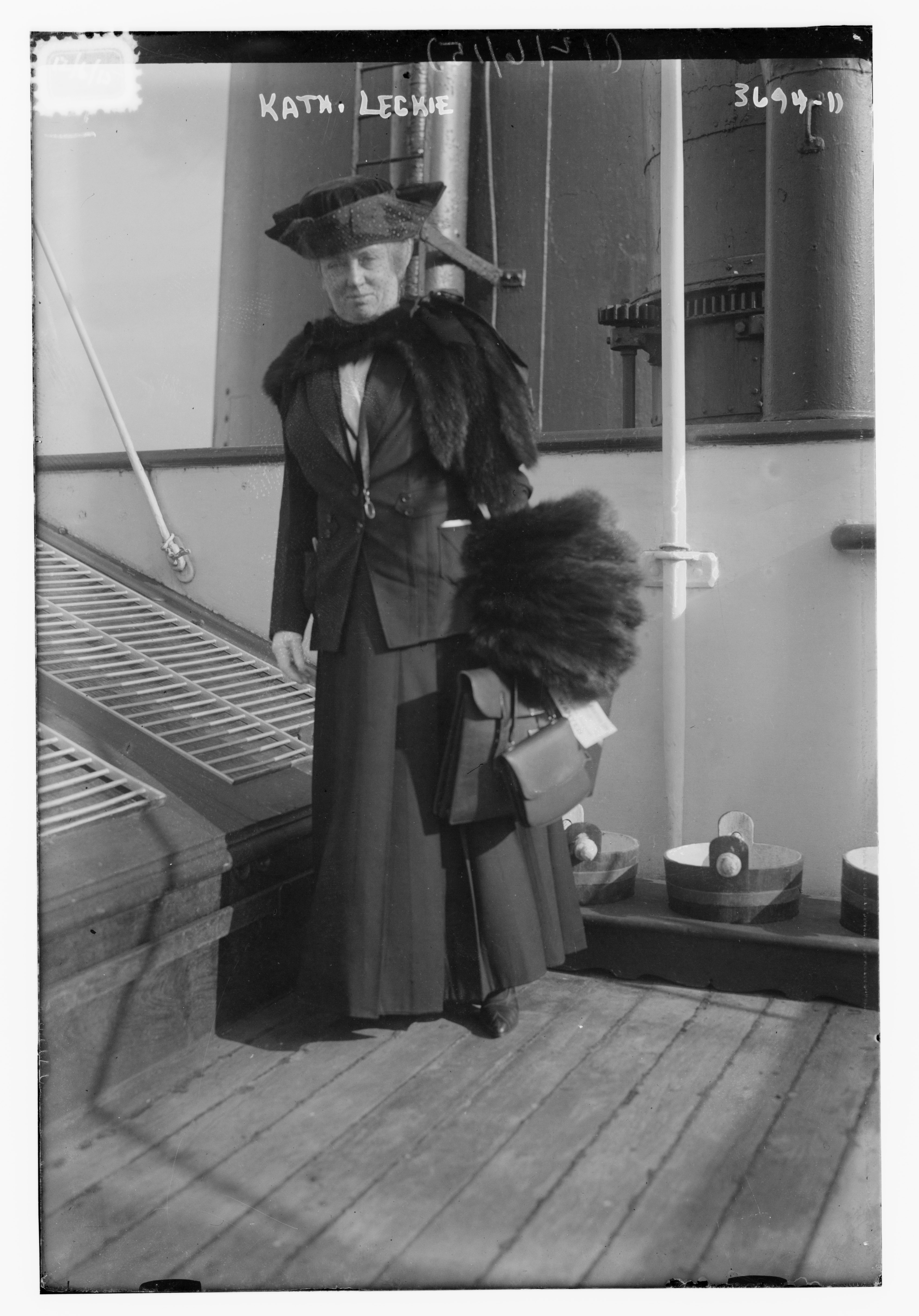
Katherine Leckie, public relations and press manager for the Henry Ford Peace Expedition (1915)

Leckie was a journalist who first came to prominence in Chicago, covering the imprisonment of Emma Goldman. She was one of the first women reporters with the City News Bureau of Chicago, and wrote about the muckraking work of Ella Reeve Bloor, the hazards of city life for young women, and the murder of Avis Linnell, among other news topics of the day. She also regularly covered fashion, and the New York stage.

Leckie was a reporter for the Chicago Chronicle, the Chicago American, and the New York Evening Journal. She held editorial positions on the magazines The Delineator (1907–1908), Woman's Magazine (1908–1912) and The Housekeeper (1913).

Leckie expanded into the field of publicity and consulting, opening her own public relations agency in New York City. One of her first prominent clients was Rosika Schwimmer, whose 1914 speaking tour she managed. In 1915–16, Leckie served as press agent for the Henry Ford Peace Expedition, working closely with Louis P. Lochner. The following year, she was recruited as an editor for the United States Food Administration's daily news service.

Leckie was a member of Heterodoxy, a feminist debating group based in Greenwich Village; she was also a member of the Woman's Political Union, the Chicago Political Equality League, and the Woman's Press Association.

== Personal life ==
Leckie had a close relationship with Clarence Darrow when both lived in Chicago.

Leckie died on July 22, 1930. The papers of Katherine Leckie are archived in the New York Public Library.
