= Mateel Farnham =

American novelist

Mateel Howe Farnham
- Mateel Howe Farnham (1927)
- Born: May 21, 1883; Atchison, Kansas, United States
- Died: May 2, 1957 (aged 73); Norwalk, Connecticut, United States
- Occupation: Novelist

Mateel Howe Farnham (May 21, 1883 – May 2, 1957) was an American novelist and short-story writer. The daughter of author and newspaper editor Edgar Watson Howe, she began writing for his newspaper and later contributed short fiction to national magazines. Her first novel, Rebellion (1927), won a $10,000 prize sponsored by Dodd, Mead & Co. and Pictorial Review. She published seven more novels, including Marsh-Fire (1928), Wild Beauty (1930), and The Tollivers (1944). Wild Beauty was adapted as the 1932 film Wayward.

== Early life ==
Farnham was born Mateel Howe on May 21, 1883, in Atchison, Kansas, to author and newspaper editor Edgar Watson Howe and Clara L. (Frank) Howe. She had two brothers, James and Eugene. Her father was the editor of the Atchison Daily Globe, and he printed some of Farnham's earliest writings. When she was 19, Farnham won a $500 prize from the Portland Oregonian for writing the best essay about that city.

== Career ==
Farnham's first novel, Rebellion, was published in 1927. It won a $10,000 prize from the publisher Dodd, Mead & Co. and the magazine Pictorial Review. Rebellion is the story of protagonist Jacqueline Burrell's revolt against a dominating father. The New York Times review noted that the novel "fairly begs for the historic damnation of faint praise." However, a reviewer in Scribner's Magazine found the central father/daughter conflict appealing and dramatic. Farnham later said that the novel was not autobiographical.

Farnham published seven more novels. Their themes highlighted the importance of women's independence. Critical reception of the books was mixed. Marsh-Fire (1928), which concerns a man and his relationships with his wife, mistress, and secretary, was found to be more interesting and better written than Rebellion in a review in the Lawrence Journal World. A review in the New York Herald Tribune of Wild Beauty (1930) noted that the novel was "workmanlike." Farnham's final novel, The Tollivers (1944), was called "one of the most hilarious books of the Fall" by the Lewiston Evening Journal.

Farnham also wrote short stories for The Delineator, Woman's Home Companion, and other magazines. In 1932, her novel Wild Beauty (1930) was adapted into the film Wayward.

== Personal life ==
Farnham was a member of Heterodoxy, a club important to the early American feminist movement. Farnham married Dwight T. Farnham in 1910. Farnham died on May 2, 1957 in Norwalk, Connecticut.

== Novels ==
- Rebellion. New York: Dodd, Mead and Company, 1927.
- Marsh-Fire. New York: Dodd, Mead and Company, 1928.
- Wild Beauty. New York: Dodd, Mead and Company, 1930.
- Battle Royal. New York: Dodd, Mead and Company, 1931.
- Lost Laughter. New York: Dodd, Mead and Company, 1933.
- Great Riches. New York: Dodd, Mead and Company, 1934.
- Ex-Love. New York: Dodd, Mead and Company, 1937.
- The Tollivers. New York: Dodd, Mead and Company, 1944.
