= The Story of a Country Town =

1883 book by E. W. Howe

The Story of A Country Town is a novel by E. W. Howe, published in 1883. It was an immediate success, going through many printings, and reviewed favorably by Mark Twain and William Dean Howells. The action of the novel was placed in Twin Mounds, a fictional city in the American Midwest.
