= Heterodoxy (group) =

Feminist debating group in Greenwich Village, New York City, in the early 20th century

Heterodoxy was the name adopted by a feminist debating group in Greenwich Village, New York City, in the early 20th century. It was notable for providing a forum for the development of more radical conceptions of feminism than the suffrage and women's club movements of the time. The heterodoxy club was also known to be a space filled with people living remarkably diverse personal lives, allowing for women to congregate and talk about their experiences with one another in what was considered to be a safe space for conversation and change. The group was considered important in the origins of American feminism.

== History ==
Heterodoxy was founded in 1912 by Marie Jenney Howe, who specified only one requirement for membership: that the applicant "not be orthodox in his or her opinion". The club was formed on the basis of the motto: "The only taboo is taboo." The club's members had diverse political views, but used those differing views to focus on a multitude of different political and social issues centered around the rights of women. The membership also included bisexual and lesbian women, in addition to heterosexuals. The luncheon club, which started with 25 members, met every two weeks on Saturdays. Most of the women who belonged in the club were part of the generation born between the 1870-1880s, making this generation the first to emphasize women's rights. The club was disestablished in the 1940s. Group members referred to themselves as "Heterodites".

Among the notable members were Mary Ware Dennett, Susan Glaspell, Charlotte Perkins Gilman, Elizabeth Gurley Flynn, Mary Heaton Vorse and Ida Rauh. Heterodites Alice Kimball, Alison Turnbull Hopkins, Doris Stevens, and Paula Jakobi were arrested in 1917 and 1918 suffrage protests, and served time in the Occoquan Workhouse, jail, or prison psychiatric wards. Grace Nail Johnson was the only African American woman who belonged to Heterodoxy. Beatrice M. Hinkle was another notable Heterodite, adding credibility to the group by being its only trained psychoanalyst while also examining a subcategory of psychology called feminist psychology. Many non-members addressed the group, including Helen Keller, Margaret Sanger, Emma Goldman, and Amy Lowell.

Heterodoxy meetings were valuable sources of information on the struggles for women's rights for its members. Although full of diverse lives and ideas, the women in the group were connected by their passion and desire to think unconventionally.

== Activism ==
The Heterodoxy Club provided a safe space for activism to begin and progress, as it was the main feminist group in the early 20th century where diverse types of women could gather weekly to discuss their opinions on issues regarding women's rights while also reflecting on their diverse political views and personal lives with open minds. The majority of the members of the Heterodoxy had completed an undergraduate education, and many even pursued post-graduate degrees in fields including education, sociology, psychology, and law; moreover, their education arguably allowed them to be prepared to take stances on a multitude of women's rights issues while participating heavily in both political and social activism. Political activism within the club included members of the Heterodoxy fighting to ensure suffrage for all women, promoting the usage of birth control, and evaluating employment disparities between men and women. Social activism within the club revolved around the field of psychoanalysis, where members of the Heterodoxy examined Freudian ideas regarding psychosexual theories in order to form a branch of psychoanalysis that focused on feminism and the psychological disparities between women and men.

=== Political activism ===
The political activism of the Heterodoxy Club includes a wide variety of political women's rights issues, including ensuring suffrage, working to create and promote different types of contraceptives, advocating for mothers, advocating against war, fighting for equal work opportunities, and advocating for immigrants. Many had met as suffragist workers, some joining labor journalist Mary Heaton Vorse in the Woman Suffrage Party whose suffrage referendum in 1917 was to result in New York becoming the first eastern state to grant women the ballot.

The club promoted and hosted many original members of the birth control movement, like Emma Goldman, Mary Ware Dennett, and Margaret Sanger. These non-official members of the Heterodoxy Club attended meetings in order to collect ideas from the Heterodites about how women would like to see different birth control forms being used in the future, discussing reproductive rights as a whole. The platform that the Heterodoxy Club gave these non-members played a role in Dennett's formation of the Volunteer Parenthood League and National Birth Control League and Sanger's The Birth Control Review, all contributing to the legalization of contraceptives.

Heterodites often advocated for mothers, providing mothers with psychological evaluations and assistance, sharing how motherhood impacts women's lives, and by pushing the idea that women are not only meant to be mothers, meaning that they have more skills than mothering and can be creative and work as well.

Many members of the Heterodoxy Club identified themselves as pacifists, some in 1915 joining Chrystal Eastman, Vorse and others in forming the Woman's Peace Party. Women in the Heterodoxy Club also fought for fair employment and fair wages, pushing women to get jobs and dismantling the idea that the man of the house needs to be the only one to provide financial support. Many women in the Heterodoxy Club also supported and advocated for immigrants, specifically immigrant mothers, by helping them find needed resources and reassuring them that their existence and their lives are legitimate.

=== Activism relating to the field of psychology ===
Psychoanalysis done by Beatrice M. Hinkle, a widely recognized member of the Heterodoxy Club, provided a way for the club to participate in social activism; moreover, this specifically includes activism within the field of psychology relating psychological differences between men and women based on self-realization and expression. Hinkle originally studied with Sigmund Freud, but began to become wary of his ideas regarding psychosexual theories, as they sexualized women while also not considering them fully capable people. One of Freud's theories suggests that women are a part of the psyche of men which Hinkle heavily disagreed with, so she moved to create an area of psychology driven by feminism. She turned to analyze and support the ideas of Jungian psychology, which focused on the psychological growth of individuals as well as their creative outlets. In order to perform her psychoanalysis research, she utilized the help of many members of the Heterodoxy Club. Many Heterodites volunteered to, or paid to, participate in her analyses where Hinkle focused on allowing the participant to realize their full potential, open their creative minds, and think about sex and sexuality in a way that opposed the morals regarding sex typically seen during this time period. Through her analyses, she promoted the usefulness and creativity of women, the theory that women are more dominant than men when attempting to change societal views on sex and sexualities, and the idea that women face psychological consequences due to the power complex and social dominance of men. Hinkle critiqued the biases of psychoanalysis through a feminist lens by performing psychoanalysis on members of the Heterodoxy Club, promoting the psychological study of women, allowing women to achieve self-realization, and contradicting the sexism that frequented the psychology field.

Hinkle also collaborated with other members of the Heterodoxy Club to spread awareness about her research on the psychology of women through her psychoanalyses. Her most significant partnership within the club was with Susan Glaspell, who wrote The Verge, a play about unorthodox and creative experiments done by women, similar to the types of experiments Hinkle performed. This play reflected on Hinkle's research by showcasing the creative minds of women, which allowed Hinkle's ideas to reach a larger audience and in turn cause more women to emphasize creativity in their lives in order to find self-realization.

== Members ==
The members of Heterodoxy lived primarily in Greenwich Village, Harlem, and the Lower East Side. While some Heterodites were famous in their own right, little is known of many of them.

- Katharine Anthony
- Sara Josephine Baker
- Stella Cominsky Ballantine
- Bessie Beatty
- Edwine Behre
- Frances Maule Bjorkman
- Mary Bookstaver
- Elinor Byrns
- Elizabeth Ellsworth Cook
- Marion Cothren
- Mabel Potter Daggett
- Maida Castelhun Darnton
- Agnes de Mille
- Anna George de Mille
- Mary Dennett
- Rheta Childe Dorr
- Elsie Dufour
- Crystal Eastman
- Edith Ellis
- Mateel Howe Farnham
- Mary Fels
- Eleanor Fitzgerald
- Elizabeth Gurley Flynn
- Zona Gale
- Charlotte Perkins Gilman
- Susan Glaspell
- Myran Louise Grant
- Beatrice Forbes-Robertson Hale
- Ruth Hale
- Anne Herendeen
- Ami Mali Hicks
- Beatrice M. Hinkle
- Leta Stetter Hollingworth
- Alison Turnbull Hopkins
- Marie Jenney Howe
- Helen Hull
- Fannie Hurst
- Elisabeth Irwin
- Inez Haynes Irwin
- Paula O. Jakobi
- Grace Nail Johnson
- Gertrude Kelly
- Edna Kenton
- Fannie Kilbourn
- Alice Mary Kimball
- Fola La Follette
- Ellen La Motte
- Eleanor Lawson
- Katherine Leckie
- Rose Strunsky Lorwin
- Mabel Dodge Luhan
- Mary Margaret McBride
- Inez Milholland
- Alice Duer Miller
- Elsie Clews Parsons
- Mary Field Parton
- Ruth Pickering Pinchot
- Grace Potter
- Ida Sedgwick Proper
- Nina Wilcox Putnam
- Ida Rauh
- Henrietta Rodman
- Netha Roe
- Lou Rogers
- Florence Guy Woolston Seabury
- Mary Shaw
- Anne O'Hagan Shinn
- Sarah Field Splint
- Doris Stevens
- Rose Pastor Stokes
- Vida Ravenscroft Sutton
- Kathleen de Vere Taylor
- Signe Kristine Toksvig
- Mary Heaton Vorse
- Elizabeth C. Watson
- Helen Westley
- Vira Boarman Whitehouse
- Margaret Widdemer
- Margaret Wycherly
- I. A. R. Wylie
- Rose Emmet Young
