= Wayward (film) =

1932 film

- Directed by: Edward Sloman
- Screenplay by: Lillian Day; Mateel Howe Farnham; Gladys Unger
- Starring: Nancy Carroll; Richard Arlen; Pauline Frederick; John Litel; Margalo Gillmore; Burke Clarke
- Cinematography: William O. Steiner
- Edited by: Arthur Ellis
- Music by: Johnny Green
- Production company: Paramount Pictures
- Distributed by: Paramount Pictures
- Release date: February 19, 1932
- Running time: 76 minutes
- Country: United States
- Language: English

Wayward is a 1932 American Pre-Code drama film directed by Edward Sloman and written by Gladys Unger (with Lillian Day and Mateel Howe Farnham). The film stars Nancy Carroll, Richard Arlen, Pauline Frederick, John Litel, and Margalo Gillmore. It was released on February 19, 1932, by Paramount Pictures.

== Cast ==
- Nancy Carroll as Daisy Frost
- Richard Arlen as David Frost
- Pauline Frederick as Mrs. Eleanor Frost
- John Litel as Robert 'Bob' Daniels
- Margalo Gillmore as Louisa Daniels
- Burke Clarke as Uncle Judson
- Dorothy Stickney as Hattie
- Gertrude Michael as Mary Morton
- Sidney Easton as George
- Mae Questel as Showgirl
