= E. W. Howe =

Novelist, magazine and newspaper editor

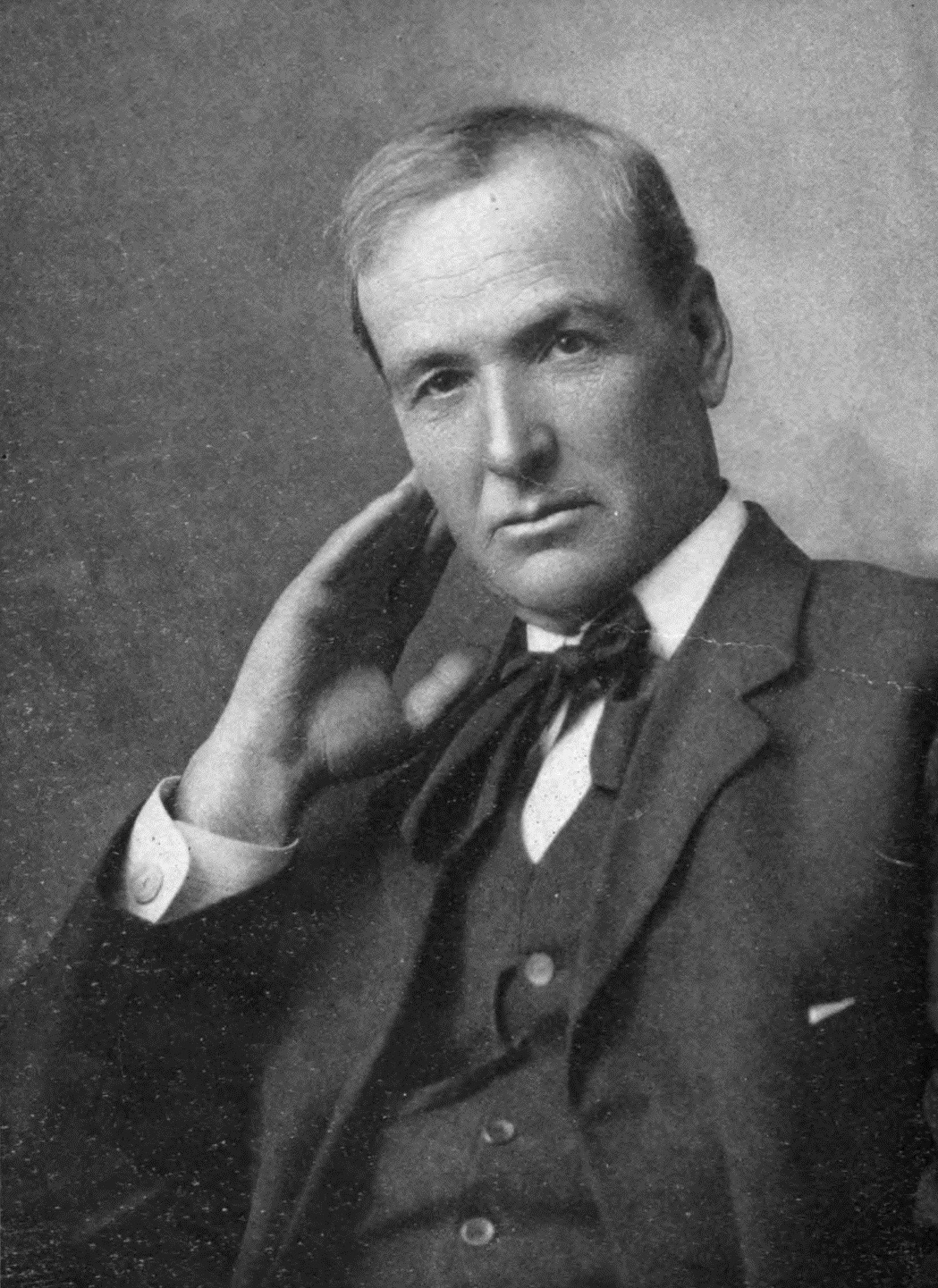
E.W. Howe (before 1912)

Edgar Watson Howe (May 3, 1853 – October 3, 1937), was an American novelist and newspaper and magazine editor in the late 19th and early 20th centuries. He was perhaps best known for his magazine, E.W. Howe's Monthly, which he wrote from 1911 to 1933. Howe was well traveled and known for his sharp wit in his editorials.

== Personal life ==
Howe was born May 3, 1853, in Wabash County, Indiana, in a community now known as Treaty. His father was Henry Howe, a farmer and Methodist circuit rider, and his mother Elizabeth (Irwin) Howe. Howe spent most of his childhood in Harrison County, Missouri, where his family moved when he was 3, first to Fairview, (Note: There have been several communities called Fairview throughout Missouri, but Howe refers to Fairview as being in Harrison County in his autobiography.) and then to Bethany around 1864.

Howe's father was a vocal abolitionist, (Note: He was arrested for spreading abolitionist doctrine.) opposing slavery on religious grounds. When the Civil War broke out, Henry Howe joined to fight for the Union. Returning to Missouri before the end of the war, he purchased a newspaper in Bethany and informed his family of his intention of using it to advocate his cause.

In 1870, while working at the Nemaha Valley Journal in Falls City, Nebraska, Edgar met Clara Frank. They were married in 1875, when Howe returned to Nebraska from Colorado. Howe had five children with Clara. Two of their children, Bessie and Ned, died young within a few days of each other in 1878. Two sons, James and Gene, eventually followed Howe into the news business, and daughter Mateel Howe Farnham became a novelist. Howe and Clara divorced in 1901, and Howe never remarried.

== Career ==
Howe began his journalistic career in March 1873 when, as a 19-year-old, he came to Golden, Colorado, from Falls City, Nebraska, and partnered with William F. Dorsey to acquire the Golden Eagle newspaper. Renaming it the Golden Globe, it was the second main newspaper in Golden and served a Republican readership and political bent. Howe, who took over complete ownership by the end of the year, quickly gained a reputation as a sharp-witted editor in the community, foreshadow his achievement of national fame.

Within a couple of years Howe sold the Globe to his brother A. J. Howe and partner William Grover Smith, and moved to Falls City, Nebraska, in 1875, where he established a new Globe newspaper, affectionately called the "Little Globe". In 1875, he merged this with the Nemaha Valley Journal to create the Globe-Journal.

In 1877 Howe established the newspaper Atchison Daily Globe in Atchison, Kansas, which he continued to edit for twenty-five years before retiring in 1911. He wrote in favor of women's suffrage at the Globe. Having been raised Methodist, he described himself as identifying with Methodism but is essentially a cultural Christian, according to his writing.

Howe's first novel, The Story of a Country Town (1883), was also his best-known. He had difficulty getting the book published and eventually printed it himself. He sent copies to Mark Twain and William Dean Howells, by whom the work was well-received, thus attracting a publisher. Howe's subsequent novels were neither critically nor popularly successful.

A 1919 edition of his Ventures in Common Sense featured a foreword by celebrated American writer (and cynic) H. L. Mencken, to whom Howe has been compared. Mencken was a fan of E. W. Howe's Monthly, which he called, "one of the most curious as it is certainly one of the most entertaining of all the 25,000 periodicals now issuing in the United States."

Howe died in 1937, at the age of 84, near Atchison.

== Selected works ==
=== Novels ===
- The Story of a Country Town (1883)
- The Mystery of the Locks (1885)
- A Moonlight Boy (1886)
- A Man Story (1887)
- An Ante-Mortem Statement (1891)
- The Confession of John Whitlock (1891)
- The Anthology of Another Town (1920)

=== Short story collections ===
- Dying Like a Gentleman and Other Short Stories (1926)
- The Covered Wagon and the West with Other Stories (1928)
- Her Fifth Marriage and Other Stories (1928)
- When a Woman Enjoys Herself and Other Tales of a Small Town (1928)

=== Nonfiction ===
- Daily Notes of a Trip Around the World (1907)
- The Trip to the West Indies (1910)
- Country Town Sayings: A Collection of Paragraphs from the Atchison Globe (1911)
- Travel Letters from New Zealand Australia and Africa (1913)
- Success Easier than Failure (1917), a self-help book
- Every Man his own Philosopher (1921), in The Saturday Evening Post, April 30, 1921, pp. 33–34
- Preaching From the Audience, Candid comments on Life (1926) Little Blue Book No. 993, Issued by E. Haldeman-Julius
- Plain People (1929), his autobiography
- The Indignations of E. W. Howe (1933): published as Little Blue Book No. 1734 by E. Haldeman-Julius Publications, introduction by J. E. Howe, Corra Harris, and N. P. Webb
