= Winifred Cooper =

British film editor

- Occupation: Film editor
- Years active: 1931–1944

Winifred Cooper was a British film editor known for her work on films like They Met in the Dark and Hitchcock's Rich and Strange.

== Selected filmography ==
- Candlelight in Algeria (1944)
- They Met in the Dark (1943)
- At Dawn We Die (1943)
- Torpedoed (1937)
- Two Who Dared (1936)
- Bill and Coo (1931)
- East of Shanghai (1931)
- The Outsider (1931)
