= Ida Rauh =

American feminist, actress, sculptor and poet (1877–1970)

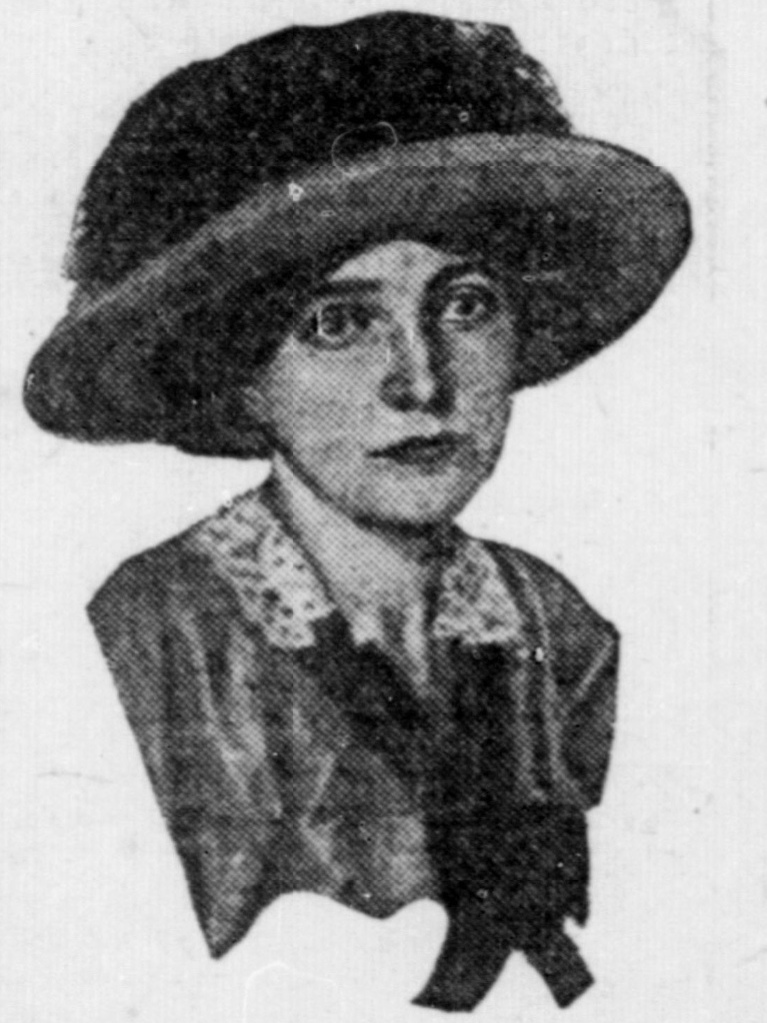
- Born: March 7, 1877; New York City, US
- Died: February 28, 1970 (aged 92); New York City, US
- Occupation(s): Feminist, actress, sculptor, poet
- Spouse: Max Eastman

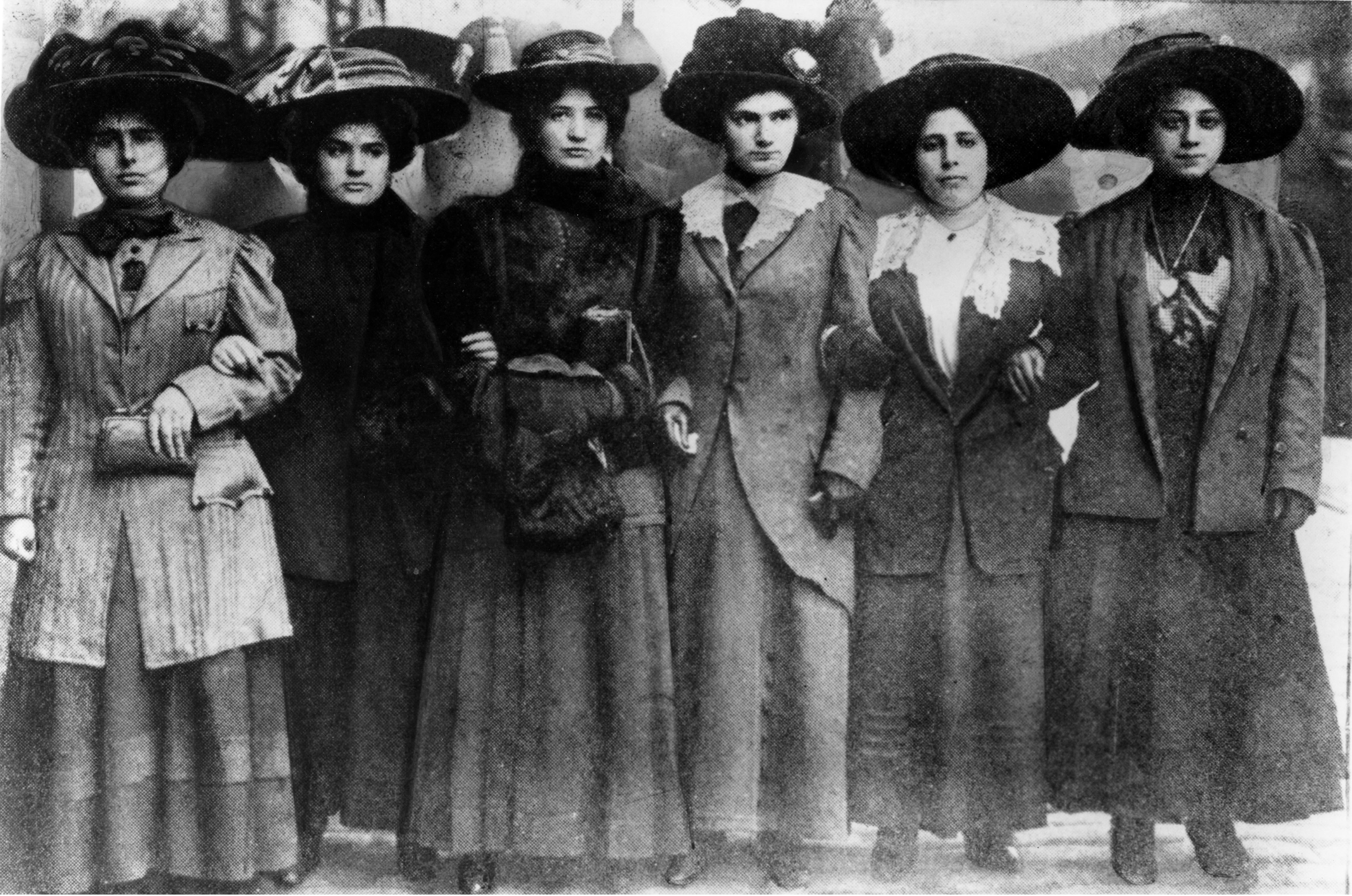
Six women including Mary Dreier, Ida Rauh, Helen Marot, Rena Borky, Yetta Raff, and Mary Effers link arms as they march to City Hall on December 3, 1909, during the New York shirtwaist strike to demand an end to abuse by police.

Ida Rauh (March 7, 1877 – February 28, 1970) was an American suffragist, actress, sculptor, and poet who helped found the Provincetown Players in 1915. The players, including Susan Glaspell, George Cram Cook, John Reed, Hutchins Hapgood, Eugene O'Neill, and others, first performed in a structure owned by Mary Heaton Vorse in Provincetown, Massachusetts. Later, the group moved to a theater on MacDougal Street in Greenwich Village. Rauh directed the first production of O'Neill's one-act play Where the Cross Is Made for the opening of the permanent Provincetown Playhouse at 133 Macdougal Street in November 1918, and in the Village she became known for her intensely emotional acting.

== Biography ==
Rauh graduated from the New York University law school in 1902, but never practiced law. She became involved with the Women's Trade Union League, including efforts to assist in the shirtwaist-makers strike in New York in 1909. Soon after, she traveled to England to join other militant women in the fight for women's suffrage. Returning to New York, she helped Mabel Dodge organize her Village salon and became active in the feminist group Heterodoxy, formed in 1912.

After her marriage to the writer and editor Max Eastman in New York in 1911, Rauh made a point of keeping her maiden name. In some places, such as Eastman's home town of Elmira, this was considered scandalous, the "first step on a slippery slope that led to feckless wives of loose morals, easy divorce, and free love". Eastman, who edited the left-wing journals The Masses and The Liberator with the help of his older sister Crystal in the second decade of the 20th century, credited Rauh with introducing him to socialism.

During her years in Greenwich Village, Rauh supported a variety of feminist causes, among them Margaret Sanger's campaigns. Arrested in 1916 for distributing birth-control information, Rauh was charged with obscenity and given a suspended sentence.

Meeting Rauh and Eastman for the first time at the Parker House, Boston, July 19, 1916, Boston Globe editorialist Lucien Price (1883–1964) describes Ida Rauh as "a smaller person than he [Eastman], also dark, with a quick, sensitive face, shimmering with the keenest intelligence—and a look of silent pity in her fine dark eyes. She wore a light, summery dress of some dust-colored stuff; her throat was sun-bronzed. Her hat was a wide straw brim with a green scarf caught loosely around it. How a woman could dress more simply or more becomingly it would have been hard to think. She had come from Provincetown with a sick baby to the Children’s Hospital, and he from New York to meet her there. The child was out of danger; they were in a state of wilted relief."

Rauh left the theater in 1920 to pursue sculpture, painting, and other interests. Among her works is a bust of writer D. H. Lawrence, who was one of her friends. A book of her poems, And This Little Life, was published in 1959. Her collected papers, including poems, television scripts, stage plays, correspondence, and other materials are housed in the American Heritage Center of the University of Wyoming in Laramie.

== Family ==
Rauh was the daughter of Samuel and Rosa Rauh of New York. Her marriage to Eastman ended in divorce in 1922, long after the two had separated. The couple had one child, Dan, with whom Eastman had no connection for 23 years after the separation. By 1922, Rauh had moved to Santa Fe, New Mexico, with Dan and was living with painter Andrew Dasburg and his son, Alfred. Rauh, Dasburg, and the two boys lived together until 1927–28 in New Mexico and in Woodstock, New York. Dan, who became a psychologist, died of a heart attack in 1969 while talking to his mother on the telephone. Rauh died a few months later.

== Works ==
- And Our Little Life. New York: Bookman Associates. 1959. OCLC 3397734.
- Papers, 1905–1960. OCLC 29737760.
