= Marie Jenney Howe =

American feminist organizer and writer

Marie Hoffendal Jenney Howe
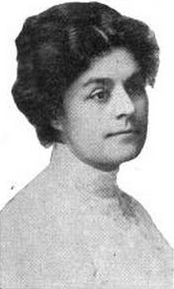
- Marie Jenney Howe, from a 1914 publication.
- Born: 1870; Syracuse, New York, USA
- Died: 1934 (aged 63–64); United States
- Occupations: Writer; editor; activist; feminist
- Spouse: Frederic C. Howe
- Writing career
- Pen name: Marie Jenney Howe
- Notable work: George Sand: The Search for Love

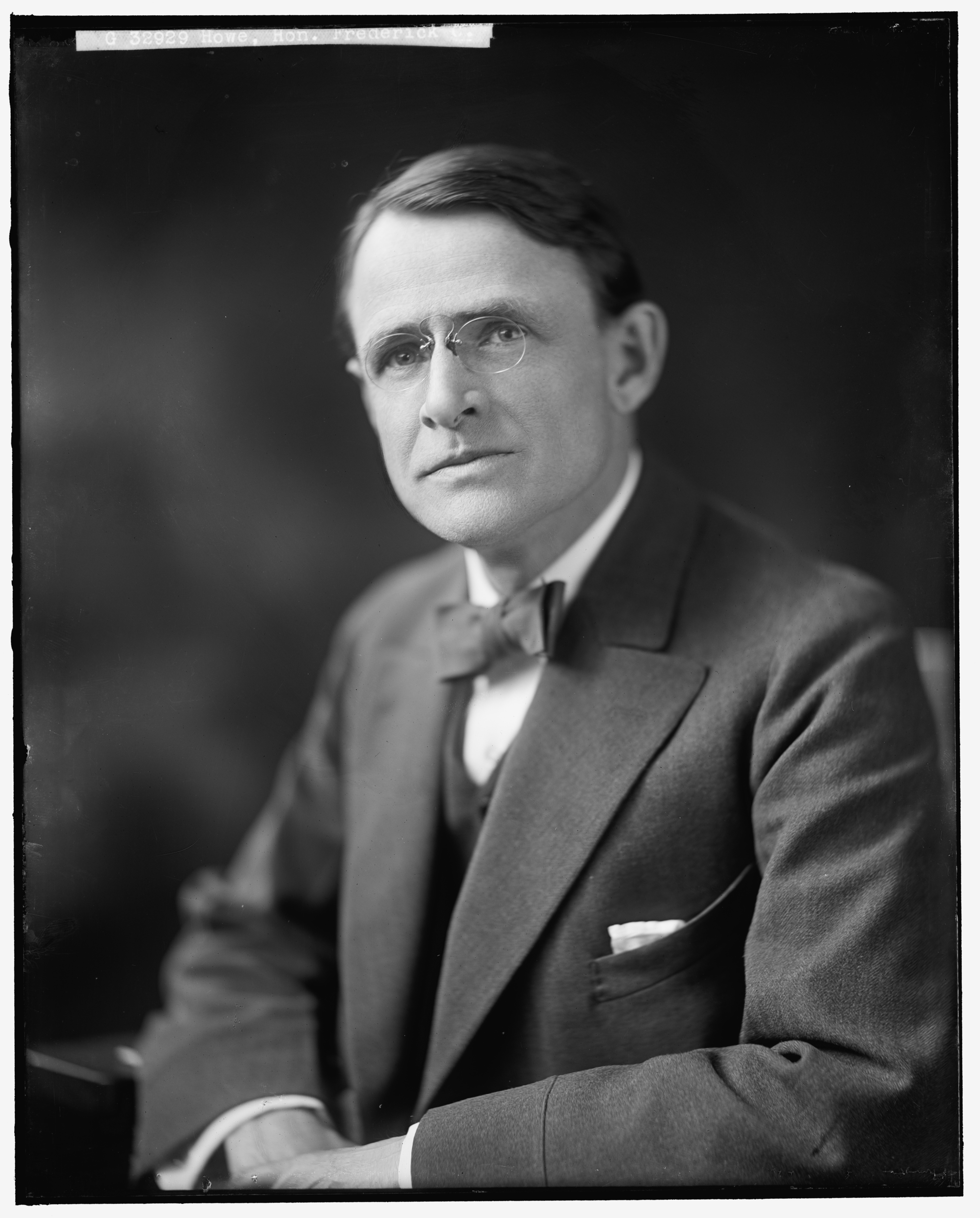
Frederic Howe

Marie Jenney Howe (1870–1934) was a feminist organizer and writer born in Syracuse, New York. She was deeply involved with the movement for Women's suffrage in the United States and founded Heterodoxy, an influential feminist debating group in Greenwich Village.

== Career ==
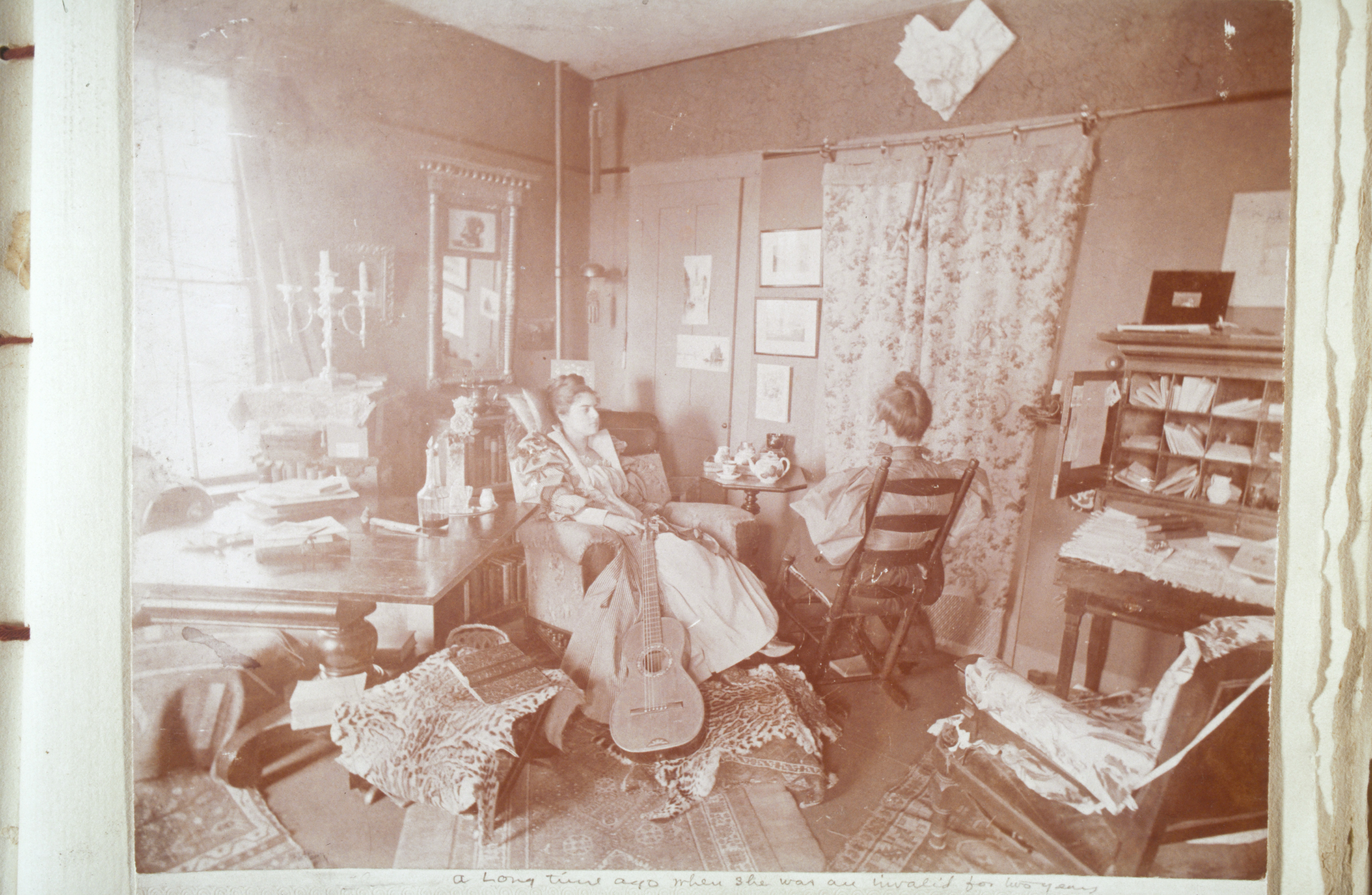
Howe seated with a guitar

Howe worked as a Unitarian minister and suffragist, graduating in 1897 from the Unitarian Theological Seminary in Meadville, Pennsylvania. She worked as assistant minister to Mary Augusta Safford in Sioux City and Des Moines, Iowa. She was active in the Consumers' League of Cleveland, and later in New York, was a leader in the National American Woman Suffrage Association, later leaving it for Alice Paul's Congressional Union, which became the National Woman's Party.

In 1926 she moved to Paris to do research into the life of George Sand, publishing a critically acclaimed biography of George Sand, George Sand: The Search for Love in 1927. With help from Sand's granddaughter Aurore, she edited and translated a collection of Sand's journals. She collaborated with many other activists and writers on essays, magazine articles, speeches, and propaganda plays, including at least two plays written with Rose Emmet Young, her close companion for many years.

== Feminism and Heterodoxy ==
In 1899, after reading Women and Economics, Jenney described herself as a "disciple" of Charlotte Perkins Gilman.

In 1912 Marie Jenney Howe founded the feminist literary and debating society, Heterodoxy, in Greenwich Village, New York City.

During the United States' participation in World War I, Heterodoxy was watched and had to move venues for every meeting. Marie Jenney Howe was taken into custody by the Secret Service in 1919 to be questioned about her radical political activities.

Heterodoxy's group of feminist public intellectuals and radicals, including Charlotte Perkins Gilman, Fannie Hurst, Elisabeth Irwin, and many others, continued until the mid-1940s.

== Personal life ==
Marie Jenney married political reformer Frederic C. Howe in 1904. They moved to New York City in 1910.

== Published works ==
- An Anti-Suffrage Monologue published by the National American Woman Suffrage Association (NAWSA), 1912. A satirical lecture. (A contemporary performance of this, retitled Someone Must Wash the Dishes, was created in 1995. Directed by Warren Kliewer for The East Lynne Company, it continues to be performed by Michele LaRue.)
- George Sand: The Search For Love. Garden City, NY: Garden City Publishers, 1927.
- George Sand's Intimate Journal. Preface by Aurore Sand. New York: John Day, Inc., 1929. reprinted New York: Haskell House Pubs., 1975.
- The Cigar Smoker. Written with Rose Young. Performed 1936.
- In 1918 she wrote Telling the Truth at the White House, a play about the suffrage march in Washington DC, with Paula O. Jakobi.
- Impossible George, a three-act play published in 1935.
