= Frances Maule Bjorkman =

American feminist (1879–1966)

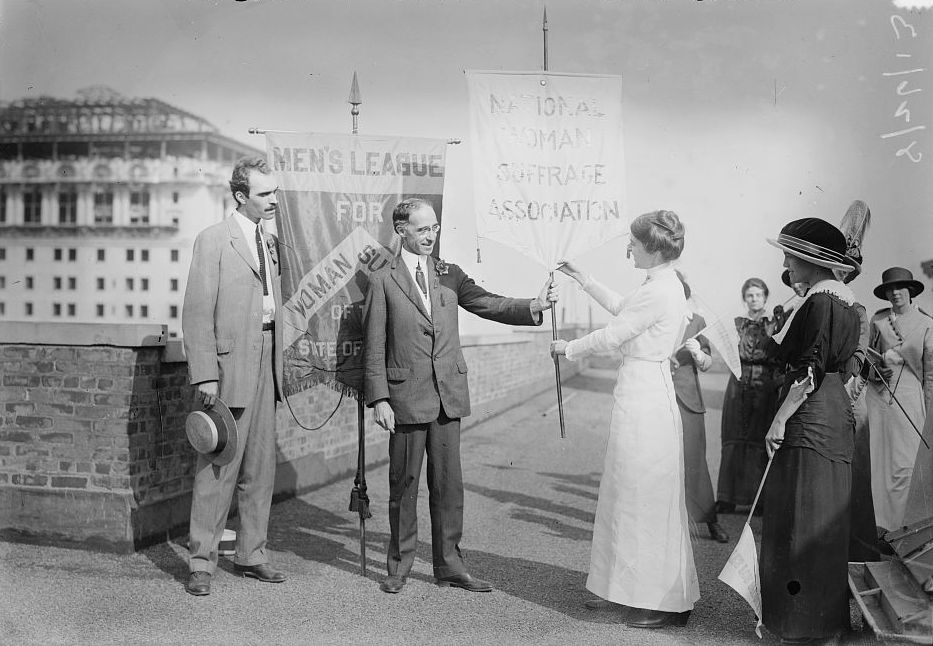
Robert Cameron Beadle, Alfred H. Brown and Frances Maule Bjorkman on August 26, 1913

Frances Maule Bjorkman (1879–1966) was a New Yorker prominent in the woman's suffrage movement. She was a member of the National Woman Suffrage Association. She was a member of the Heterodoxy women's group. She lived at the Helicon Home Colony, an experimental community founded by Upton Sinclair.

== Biography ==
Frances Maule was born in Fairmont, Nebraska on October 24, 1879. She attended Notre Dame of Maryland University and the University of Nebraska. She married Swedish author Edwin Björkman in New York City in 1906. She was a Socialist active in the feminist movement. After separating from her husband Maule began a long-term, same-sex relationship with fellow Heterodoxy member Kathleen de Vere Taylor that lasted throughout the 1930s and 1940s. They lived together first in Manhattan and then in Woodstock, New York. After Taylor's death in 1949 Maule inherited the house and lived there until her own death in 1966.

== Writings ==
- Home and school visitors (1909)
- The cure for two million sick: The discovery of the hookworm disease (1909) with Charles Wardell Stiles
- Tests of Woman Suffrage States in The New York Times on June 3, 1912
- Woman suffrage: history, arguments and results (1913)
