= Rich and Strange =

1931 film

- Theatrical poster
- Directed by: Alfred Hitchcock
- Screenplay by: Alfred Hitchcock; Alma Reville; Val Valentine
- Based on: Rich and Strange by Dale Collins
- Produced by: John Maxwell
- Starring: Henry Kendall; Joan Barry
- Cinematography: John "Jack" Cox; Charles Martin
- Edited by: Winifred Cooper; Rene Marrison
- Music by: Adolph Hallis
- Production company: British International Pictures
- Distributed by: Wardour Films (UK)
- Release dates: 10 December 1931 (UK); 1 January 1932 (US)
- Running time: 83 minutes
- Country: United Kingdom
- Language: English

Rich and Strange, released in the United States as East of Shanghai, is a 1931 British romance film directed by Alfred Hitchcock during his time in the British film industry. The film was adapted by Hitchcock, his wife Alma Reville, and Val Valentine from the 1930 novel by Dale Collins. The title is an allusion to words of Ariel's song "Full fathom five" in Shakespeare's The Tempest.

== Plot ==
A London couple, Fred and Emily ("Em") Hill, live a mundane middle-class existence, but Fred is dissatisfied. They have a black cat. They receive a letter informing them a wealthy uncle will advance them as much money as they need to travel the world now rather than after his death. So Fred quits his job, and they travel across the channel to France and visit Paris's hot spots. Fred is sea-sick the entire time. Next, they book passage on an ocean liner departing Marseille for the Orient. However, Fred quickly becomes seasick, leaving Em alone on board. She becomes acquainted with an Commodore named Gordon, a dapper, popular bachelor of mature years. They talk about love and then fall in love. After she falls into his arms in a dizzy spell, she looks up at him and they kiss. Em walks away. Later, after he recovers, Fred is smitten with a German princess. As the voyage progresses, Fred and Em spend more and more time with their new paramours, to the virtual exclusion of each other.

Upon arriving in Singapore, Fred and Em's marriage is in shambles. Em prepares to leave with Gordon for his home in Kuala Lumpur. However, after Gordon and Em leave to be together, Gordon tells her that Fred's princess is actually an adventuress who is just using him until his money runs out. Em decides she cannot allow Fred to fall into this trap, so she abandons Gordon to warn her husband. But it is too late: Fred discovers his "princess" has just left for Rangoon, with £1000 of his money.

Fred is resentful and quite mean to Emily, throwing her on a bed at one point. Fred and Emily reconcile, but have only enough left to book passage home to England on a tramp steamer. Later, the ship is badly damaged in a collision in fog and is abandoned by the crew, but Fred and Em are trapped in their cabin as the ship sinks and prepare themselves for the end. However, they awake in the morning to find the ship still afloat, and they escape through a porthole.

A Chinese junk arrives, and while the crew rescue Chinese workers who were left behind on the ship, Fred and Em are also rescued and bring a black cat as they board the junk. After they have eaten some rice and meat given them by the crew, they discover they have been eating the cat when they see its hide nailed to a door. A Chinese mother gives birth, and Em is happy to see Fred marvel at the father's love for the infant. Fred realizes they can recover the insured money because the ship sank. When Fred and Em arrive home they seem happy but quickly begin bickering about whether they will move or stay in their apartment.

== Cast ==
- Henry Kendall as Fred Hill
- Joan Barry as Emily Hill
- Percy Marmont as Commander Gordon
- Betty Amann as The Princess
- Elsie Randolph as The Old Maid, a fellow ship's passenger who annoys everyone

== Production ==
The film exhibits techniques developed by Hitchcock in his later films. Most notable are the shipboard sets, including a recreation of a full-size ship in a water tank. The director also experimented with camera techniques and shot compositions, most prominently in the film's innovative opening sequence, which shows city office workers leaving work at the end of the day. This dialogue-free scene was made on a specially constructed set and filmed in a single continuous pan shot, and is followed by an extended comedic sequence depicting Fred's workaday travails as he travels home on the train.

== Reception ==
Released during Hitchcock's period between The Lodger (1927) and his breakthrough hits The Man Who Knew Too Much (1934) and The 39 Steps (1935), Rich and Strange was a failure at both the British and US box office. The film's lack of commercial and critical success is often attributed to the fact that there is dialogue for only about a quarter of the film, and that many features of silent films remain, including scene captions, exaggerated acting styles and heavy makeup. Hitchcock's experiment in pre-sound emotive performances over dialogue was possibly another contributing factor. An early scene of Fred leaving work for home via the London Underground is very reminiscent of Chaplin and highly dissimilar to typical Hitchcock staging.

== Copyright status and home media ==
Rich and Strange is copyrighted worldwide but has been heavily bootlegged on home video. Despite this, various licensed, restored releases have appeared on DVD from Optimum in the UK, Lionsgate in the US and many others.
