= Dale Collins =

Australian writer (1897–1956)

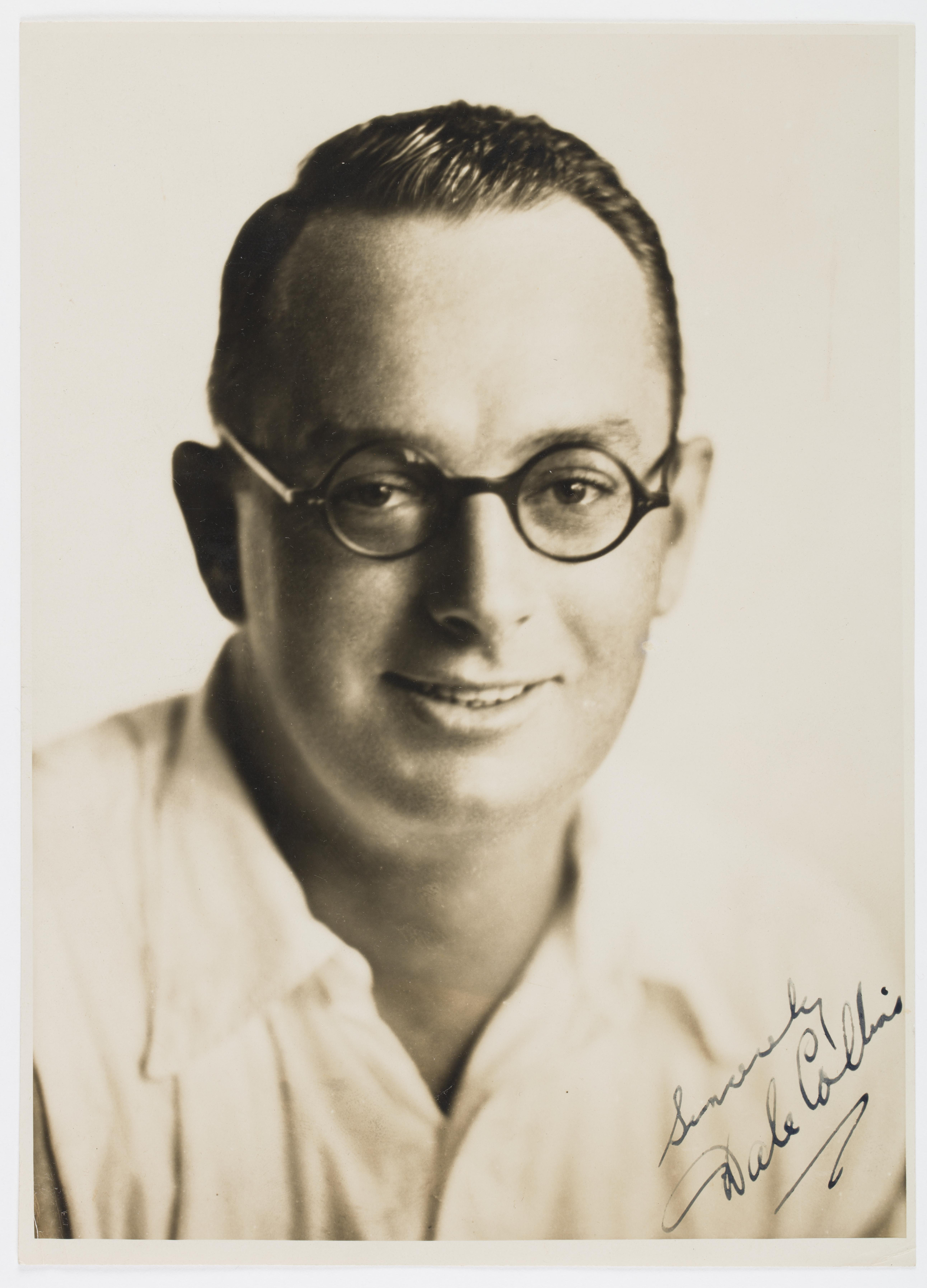
Dale Collins

Cuthbert Quinlan Dale Collins (9 April 1897 – 3 March 1956) was an Australian journalist and author of popular fiction. He is notable for a series of sea romances written in the 1920s and 1930s, some of which were adapted for motion pictures, including Rich and Strange, directed by Alfred Hitchcock, which closely followed his novel of the same name.

== Early life ==
He was born at Balmain, New South Wales, third son of Michael John Collins, an Irish doctor who had been a ship's surgeon in the Royal Mail Steam Packet Co., and his English wife Esther, née Copeland.

Collins's freelance career started at age 17 when his short story "The Riddle" was published in The Australasian, followed by several others until he secured a position in the newsroom of The Herald (Melbourne) in 1922.

In later life he lived in East Malvern, a suburb of Melbourne, and had two daughters, Susan and Felicity.

== Publications ==
Collins published 37 books, including some under the pen names of 'Stephen Fennimore' and 'Michael Copeland'.

=== Novels ===
- 1923 Sea-tracks of the Speejacks Round the World
- 1924 Ordeal
- 1925 The Haven: A Chronicle
- 1927 The Sentimentalists (reprinted as Sal of Singapore, translated into German)
- 1928 Vanity Under the Sun
- 1929 The Idolaters
- 1930 Rich and Strange
- 1932 Jungle Maid
- 1934 Vulnerable: A Tale with Cards
- 1936 Race the Sun
- 1947 Bright Vista
- 1949 Bush Holiday (as Stephen Fennimore)
- 1950 Bush Voyage
- 1951 Victoria's My Home Ground
- 1959 Anzac Adventure: The Story of Gallipoli Told for Young Readers

=== Short stories ===
- 1914 The Riddle. The Australasian
- 1919 The Paper Soldier. The Weekly Times, 19 July 1919

=== Filmography ===
- Sal of Singapore (1928)
- The Ship from Shanghai (1930)
- His Woman (1931)
- Rich and Strange (1931) (titled East of Shanghai in the United States)
