= Sarah Field Splint =

American author, editor, consultant, and feminist

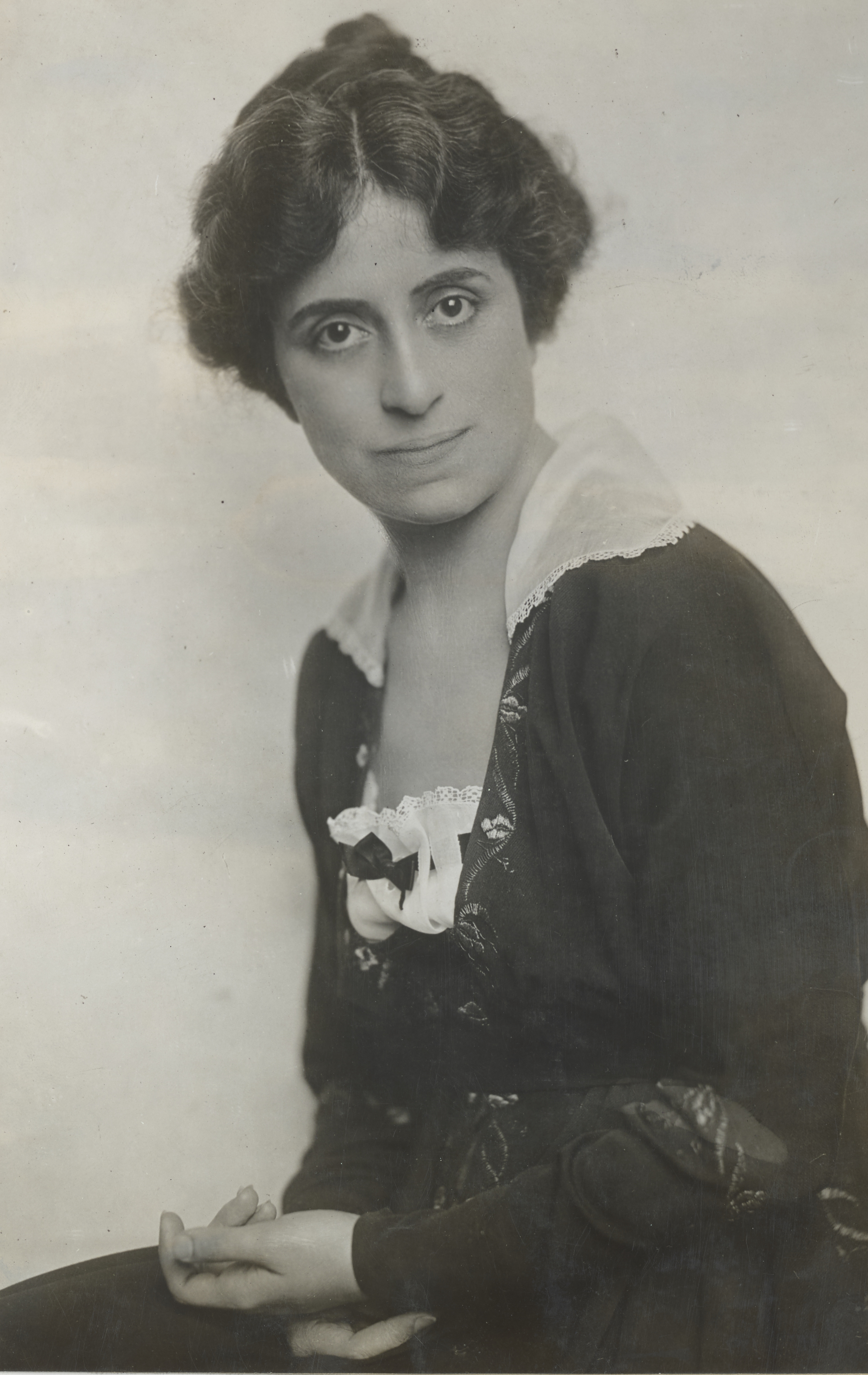
- Sarah Field Splint, 1917 – 1918
- Born: 1883; Swarthmore, Pennsylvania
- Died: 1959 (aged 75–76)
- Occupation: Feminist writer
- Writing career
- Language: American English
- Literary movement: Second Wave Feminism

Sarah Field Splint (1883–1959) was an American author, editor, domestic science consultant, and feminist.

== Biography ==
Sarah Field Splint, of Swarthmore, Pennsylvania, was an alumna of Colby College. From 1914 to 1919 she was the editor of the magazine "Today's Housewife", published in Cooperstown, New York. She served as chief of the Home Conservation Division of the Food Conservation Division of the United States Food Administration, designing the USFA uniform, later known as the Hoover apron. Splint was an editor of Woman's Home Companion, Managing Editor of The Woman's Magazine, and a member of the staff of The Delineator. She associated with feminist group, Heterodoxy, having favored suffrage. Splint donated to her alma mater's library a collection of the works of Sarah Orne Jewett. She died in 1959.

== Selected works ==
- 192?, The Rumford modern methods of cooking; delicious and savory dishes ...
- 1922, Time-saving cookery
- 1923, What you gain by using Dairylea milk : recipes and budget
- 1925, Master-recipes : a new time-saving method of cookery : prepared in McCall's laboratory-kitchen, Sarah Field Splint, Director
- 1925, What to serve at parties : menus and recipes for parties of every kind : prepared in McCall's laboratory-kitchen, Sarah Field Splint, Director
- 1926, Pies and pastries : icings and frostings
- 1926, The art of cooking and serving
- 1926, Some hints on deep fat frying
- 1926, Smoothtop cookery with gas, the modern fuel
- 1929, 199 selected recipes
- 1930, Salads, suppers, picnics : a book of delicious and time saving dishes made with Premier Salad Dressing
- 1930, A manual of cookery in 12 chapters as applied to classroom work
- 1931, Table service and accessories
- 1935, 65 prize recipes from the South : a collection of prize-winning recipes, proved favorites from Southern homes

== Bibliography ==
- Driver, Elizabeth (2008). Culinary Landmarks: A Bibliography of Canadian Cookbooks, 1825-1949. University of Toronto Press. ISBN 978-0-8020-4790-8.
- Goldstein, Carolyn M. (2012). Creating Consumers: Home Economists in Twentieth-century America. Univ of North Carolina Press. ISBN 978-0-8078-3553-1.
- Marks, Susan (11 May 2010). Finding Betty Crocker: The Secret Life of America's First Lady of Food. Simon and Schuster. ISBN 978-1-4391-0401-9.
- Rossiter, Margaret W. (1 August 1984). Women Scientists in America: Struggles and Strategies to 1940. JHU Press. ISBN 978-0-8018-2509-5.
- The Woman's Magazine (1914). The Woman's Magazine (Public domain ed.). New Idea Publishing Co.
