= Sal of Singapore =

1929 film

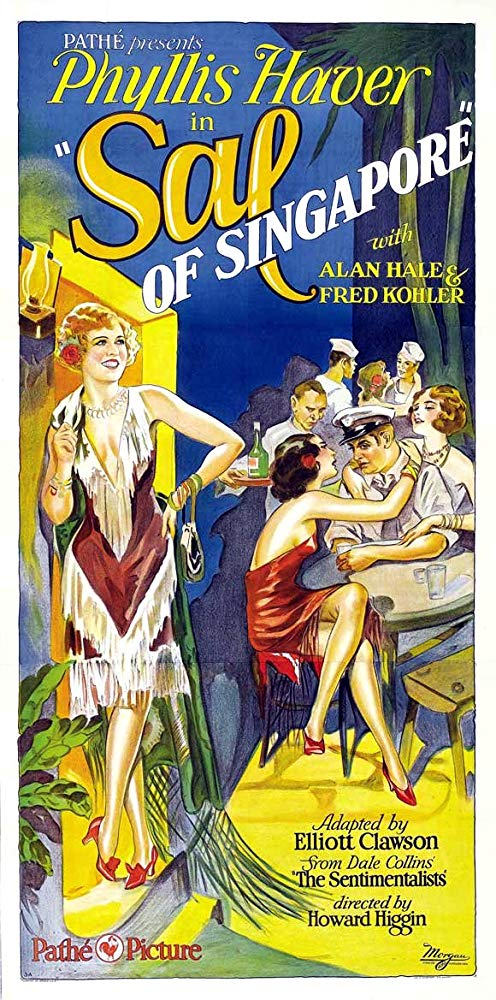
- Directed by: Howard Higgin
- Written by: Elliott J. Clawson
- Based on: The Sentimentalists by Dale Collins
- Starring: Phyllis Haver
- Cinematography: John J. Mescall
- Distributed by: Pathe Exchange
- Release date: November 4, 1928
- Running time: 70 minutes
- Country: United States
- Languages: Sound (Part-Talkie) (English Intertitles)

Sal of Singapore is a 1928 American sound part-talkie drama film directed by Howard Higgin. In addition to sequences with audible dialogue or talking sequences, the film features a synchronized musical score and sound effects along with English intertitles. The film's sets were designed by the art director Edward C. Jewell. Complete prints of the film exist.

At the 2nd Academy Awards in 1930, Elliott J. Clawson was nominated for an Academy Award in the category Best Writing (Adapted Screenplay).

== Plot ==
Captain Lief Erickson, master of a rugged freighter, is about to enjoy the nightlife of Mazatlán Harbor when he discovers that someone has abandoned a baby in the launch attached to his ship. At first bewildered, the hard-boiled captain is surprised to find his heart stirred by the tiny hands clutching his fingers. Determined to see the infant cared for, he decides to bring the child with him on the voyage, intending to find a suitable woman to tend it.

The women of the seaport, however, prove to be entirely unfit for the task. By chance, Erickson encounters “Singapore Sal”, a disillusioned but spirited woman of the waterfront, during a clash with his old rival Captain Sunday. Recognizing her intelligence beneath the hardened exterior, Erickson, with the aid of his mate, shanghais Sal and forces her aboard his ship.

Once freed from her bonds, Sal fights Erickson like a fury. The Herculean captain only laughs at her blows, locks her in his cabin, and orders his crew to lift anchor. Frantically seeking escape, Sal discovers the baby in the adjoining cabin. Initially annoyed by its cries, she soon feels pity for the “poor little devil.” Realizing it is hungry, she swallows her hatred of Erickson long enough to demand milk and supplies. Ingeniously, she fashions a feeding bottle from an empty whiskey flask and a glove finger, mixing condensed milk with hot water to save the child.

Though Erickson admires Sal’s resourcefulness, he remains emotionally distant, seeing her only as a competent caretaker for the baby he has come to love. At her orders he fetches hot water, starch, safety pins, and other necessities, quietly acknowledging her skill. But while Erickson views her impersonally, his mate, and others among the crew, are not blind to her womanly allure. Hardened by her sordid past, Sal is neither offended nor shocked by their advances; instead she plots to use their desires to her advantage, planning to escape with the baby at the first port.

When Erickson realizes that his mate has become dangerously obsessed with Sal, he fears for the child’s safety. Soon the man is reported “washed overboard.” When Sal accuses Erickson of murder, he does not deny it, and she secretly vows to hold this knowledge over him when they reach San Francisco. From then on, their relationship becomes a silent battle for possession of the baby.

The struggle is interrupted when the infant falls ill. Erickson races for San Francisco, while he and Sal put aside their venom to care for the child. For two days and nights they hover over it, exhausted, but gentler with one another than ever before. At last the fever breaks, and the fog lifts as the ship nears the Golden Gate. Moved, Erickson makes the bravest gesture of his life: he tells Sal to go ashore and keep the baby.

Though she has schemed for this moment, Sal finds no joy in it. Dressing once more in the tawdry finery of her waterfront days, she sees her reflection and recoils. Who is she, “Singapore Sal,” to guide a child’s future? With tears streaming, she writes Erickson a note, declaring the baby will be safer in his hands, and slips away alone.

Sal boards the ship of Captain Sunday, recognizing him as Erickson’s rival. Sunday, amused at the idea of stealing her, puts to sea. When Erickson discovers her note and learns she has gone to Sunday’s vessel, he understands her sacrifice but cannot let her go. He pursues, and after a thrilling chase across the waves, brings his crew aboard Sunday’s ship. In a fierce but bloodless hand-to-hand fight, Erickson is victorious. Sal watches in breathless excitement.

The two captains, though rivals, respect each other. Erickson, as victor, commands Sunday to perform a marriage ceremony—since, being more than twelve miles at sea, Sunday has the legal right as master of a ship. Erickson shyly asks Sal to be his wife. She, equally moved yet unable to speak her emotions, consents. Amidst the salt spray and fading rivalries, “Singapore Sal” finds not only redemption but love, and the baby a true family.

== Cast ==
- Phyllis Haver as Sal
- Alan Hale as Captain Erickson
- Fred Kohler as Captain Sunday
- Noble Johnson as Erickson's 1st Mate
- Dan Wolheim as Erickson's 2nd Mate
- Jules Cowles as Cook
- Pat Harmon as Sunday's 1st Mate
- Harold William Hill as Baby

== Music ==
The film featured a theme song entitled “Singapore Sal” which was composed by Al Koppell, Billy Stone and Charles Weinberg (music and lyrics). Also featured on the soundtrack was a song entitled “Singapore Sal's Lullaby” by Jack Grun (music) and Charley Wynn (lyrics).

== See also ==
- List of early sound feature films (1926–1929)
