= Kathleen de Vere Taylor =

Stockbroker and suffragist

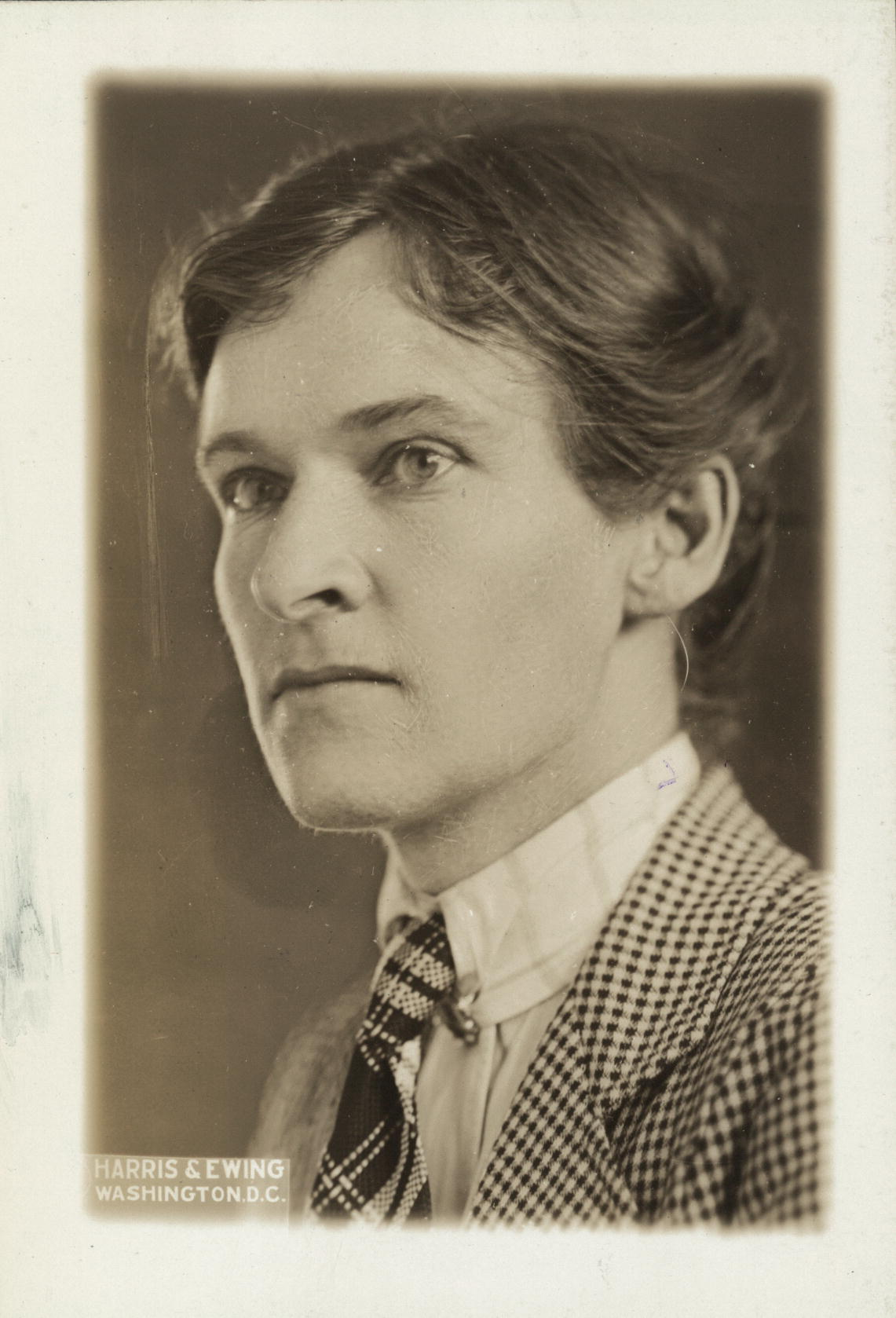
Kathleen de Vere Taylor, wearing a houndstooth-checked jacket and a plaid tie with tie-pin; from the Records of the National Woman's Party, Library of Congress

Kathleen de Vere Taylor (c. 1873 – November 4, 1949) was an American stockbroker and suffrage activist.

== Early life and education ==
Kathleen de Vere Taylor was born in New York City. She studied in Germany as a young woman, and taught music, German, and French upon her return to New York.

== Career and activism ==
Taylor was a member of several suffrage organizations, and of Heterodoxy, a feminist club based in Greenwich Village. She was also on the executive committee of the National Birth Control League. She was among the group of Women's Political Union members who staged a 24-hour suffrage lecture marathon in New York City in October 1913. In 1916 she spoke at a suffrage luncheon in Washington, went to Kansas with other suffrage leaders, and helped work at Chicago polls handing out suffrage and anti-Wilson literature that year. Taylor made a public statement against the re-election of James Wolcott Wadsworth, Jr. to the Senate in 1920, announcing in an open letter that "I shall use all the power I can command to oppose the re-election of any candidate...who has stood against the will of our state and party on the question of woman suffrage."

As a stockbroker, Taylor worked for the Charles Edey brokerage beginning in 1914, and moved to Fenner & Beane and other firms. She became manager of a branch office of Harris, Irby & Vose in 1928, and is said to have been the first woman to manage a brokerage office in New York City. Her office employed only women, and managed only women's accounts. She was in that position during the Wall Street crash of 1929, and declared herself proud of the women in her office during that devastation: "Not one tear did I see during all the time the market was at its worst," she later recalled. "No crowd of men under pressure ever could show up as better sports." In 1931 she moved to Greer, Crane & Webb, and then in 1941 to Carey, Joost & Patrick. She retired from this last firm in 1947.

== Personal life ==
In 1901 Kathleen de Vere Taylor's engagement to S. Carroll Chancellor of Leesburg, Virginia, was announced, but the marriage never took place. In the 1930s and 1940s Taylor was in a long-term, same-sex relationship with fellow Heterodoxy member Frances Maule. They lived together in Manhattan and later in Woodstock, New York.

Taylor died in 1949, aged 76, after a heart attack at her home in Woodstock.
