= Free Acres, New Jersey =

Populated place in Union County, New Jersey, US

- Unincorporated community
- Free Acres's location in Union County (Inset: Union County in New Jersey) Free Acres, New Jersey (New Jersey) Free Acres, New Jersey (the United States)
- Coordinates: 40°39′38″N 74°26′38″W
- Country: United States
- State: New Jersey
- County: Somerset and Union
- Township: Berkeley Heights and Watchung
- Elevation: 440 ft (134 m)
- ZIP Code: 07922
- GNIS feature ID: 0876502

Free Acres is an unincorporated community located along the border of Berkeley Heights in Union County and Watchung in Somerset County, in the U.S. state of New Jersey. Free Acres was created in 1910 as a social experiment by Bolton Hall, an Irish-born New York entrepreneur, reformer and follower of Leo Tolstoy. Hall believed in economist Henry George's idea of single taxation, under which residents pay a land value tax to the community based on the value of the land alone, and in turn, the community pays a lump sum to the municipality.

The 75-acre (300,000 m^{2}) wooded community of 85 households is located about 33 mi (53 km) west of New York City. Residents own their houses, but pay a lease for the land, which is owned collectively by the community. Free Acres contains a farmhouse and a spring-fed pool. Residents of Free Acres still pay tax to the Free Acres Association, which is now a more common version of the property tax, based on the value of the land and any improvements. The association maintains the community's streets and swimming pool, approves architectural changes to homes, and pays a lump sum in taxes to the two municipalities.

Among the early residents of Free Acres were author Thorne Smith and his wife Celia, and actor James Cagney and his wife Billie. It has been home to scientists who worked at the nearby Bell Labs Murray Hill.

== See also ==
- Commune
- Tragedy of the Commons
