= The Delineator =

American women's magazine

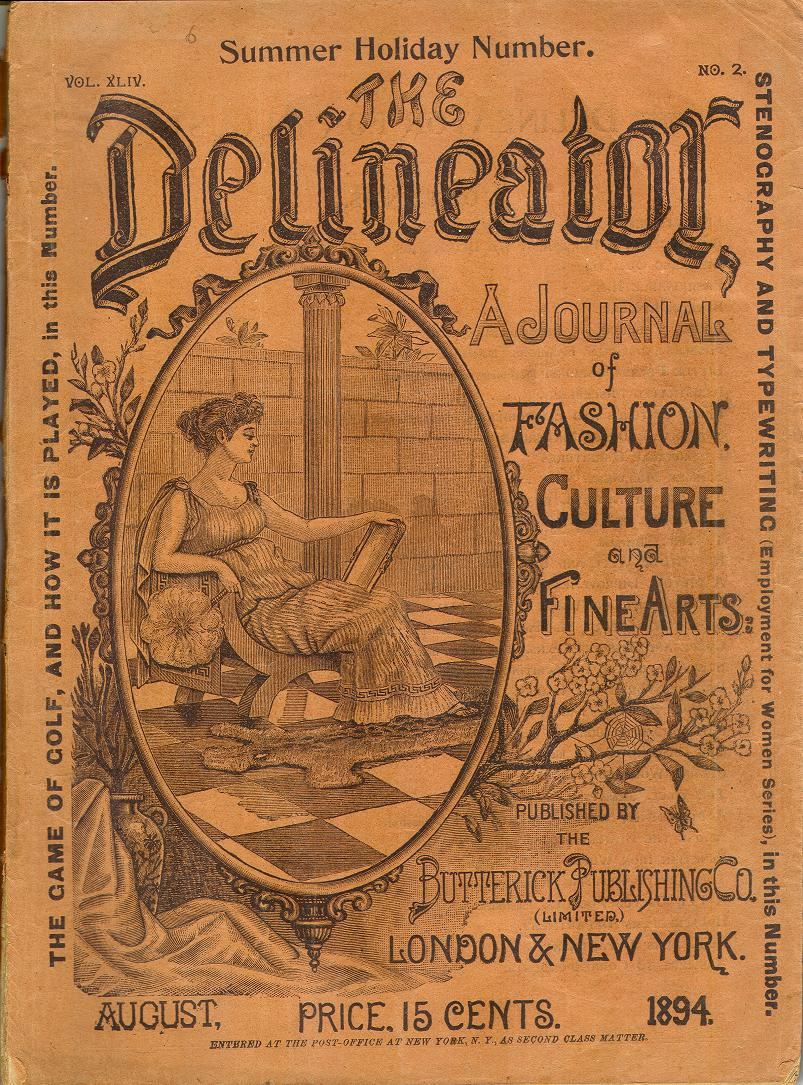
The Delineator, August 1894 cover

The Delineator was an American women's magazine of the late 19th and early 20th centuries, founded by the Butterick Publishing Company in 1869 under the name The Metropolitan Monthly. Its name was changed in 1875. The magazine was published on a monthly basis in New York City. In November 1926, under the editorship of Mrs. William Brown Meloney, it absorbed The Designer, founded in 1887 and published by the Standard Fashion Company, a Butterick subsidiary.

One of its managing editors was writer Theodore Dreiser, who worked with other members of the staff such as Sarah Field Splint (later known for writing cookbooks) and Arthur Sullivant Hoffman. The novelist and short story writer, Honoré Willsie Morrow served as editor, 1914–19.

Seal of approval of the Delineator Home Institute

The Delineator featured the Butterick sewing patterns and provided an in-depth look at the fashion of the day. Butterick also produced quarterly catalogs of fashion patterns in the 1920s and early 1930s.

In addition to clothing patterns, the magazine published photos and drawings of embroidery and needlework that could be used to adorn both clothing and items for the home. It also included articles on all forms of home decor. It also published fiction, including many short stories by L. Frank Baum.

The magazine also published articles on social and political reform, including eugenics, a racial superiority pseudoscience. Charles Dwyer, editor from 1894–1906, expanded the magazine's coverage to include editorials, fiction, and women's increasing involvement in public life. His successor, Theodore Dreiser published articles addressing women's roles as consumers, and invited readers to write in about current social problems.

In the late 1920s, it featured covers by noted fashion artist Helen Dryden.

It ceased publication in 1937 when it was merged with The Pictorial Review, which ceased publication two years later.

== Features ==
In May 1894 the magazine began a monthly series on "Women's Colleges" with a piece on Vassar. Published by graduates of those colleges, the series covered locations, academics, traditions and costs. After the first year, the series' focus shifted to women's experiences at co-ed schools, starting with Cornell University and expanding to other land-grant universities.

From 1907–1911, the magazine published the Child-Rescue Campaign, in which readers could write to the magazine to adopt children whose photographs and stories were serialized in each issue. Over two thousand institutionalized children of white working-class and/or European immigrant parents were placed in private homes during the campaign. It eventually resulted in the 1909 White House Conference on the Care of Dependent Children, hosted by President Theodore Roosevelt.

In 1921 the Better Homes in America campaign was launched by editor Marie Mattingly Maloney to celebrate home ownership, modernization, and beautification. In 1923 it became a national campaign, with support from President Calvin Coolidge and Secretary of Commerce Herbert Hoover.
