= Legal aid society =

Legal aid society may refer to:

- The Legal Aid Society, New York City
- Legal Aid Society of Cleveland
- Legal Aid Society of the District of Columbia

== See also ==
- Legal aid, the concept
- Legal Services Society, British Columbia
