= Lexow =

Lexow may refer to:

- Clarence Lexow who headed the Lexow Committee
- Charles K. Lexow, early 20th century New York politician
