= Mother Mountain =

Mother Mountain may refer to:

- Ynnakh Mountain, in Yakutia, Russia
- Mother Mountain (film)
- Mother Mountain (Washington)

== See also ==
- Our Mother the Mountain, studio album
- Sierra Madre Mountains
