= Burgrabice =

- Village
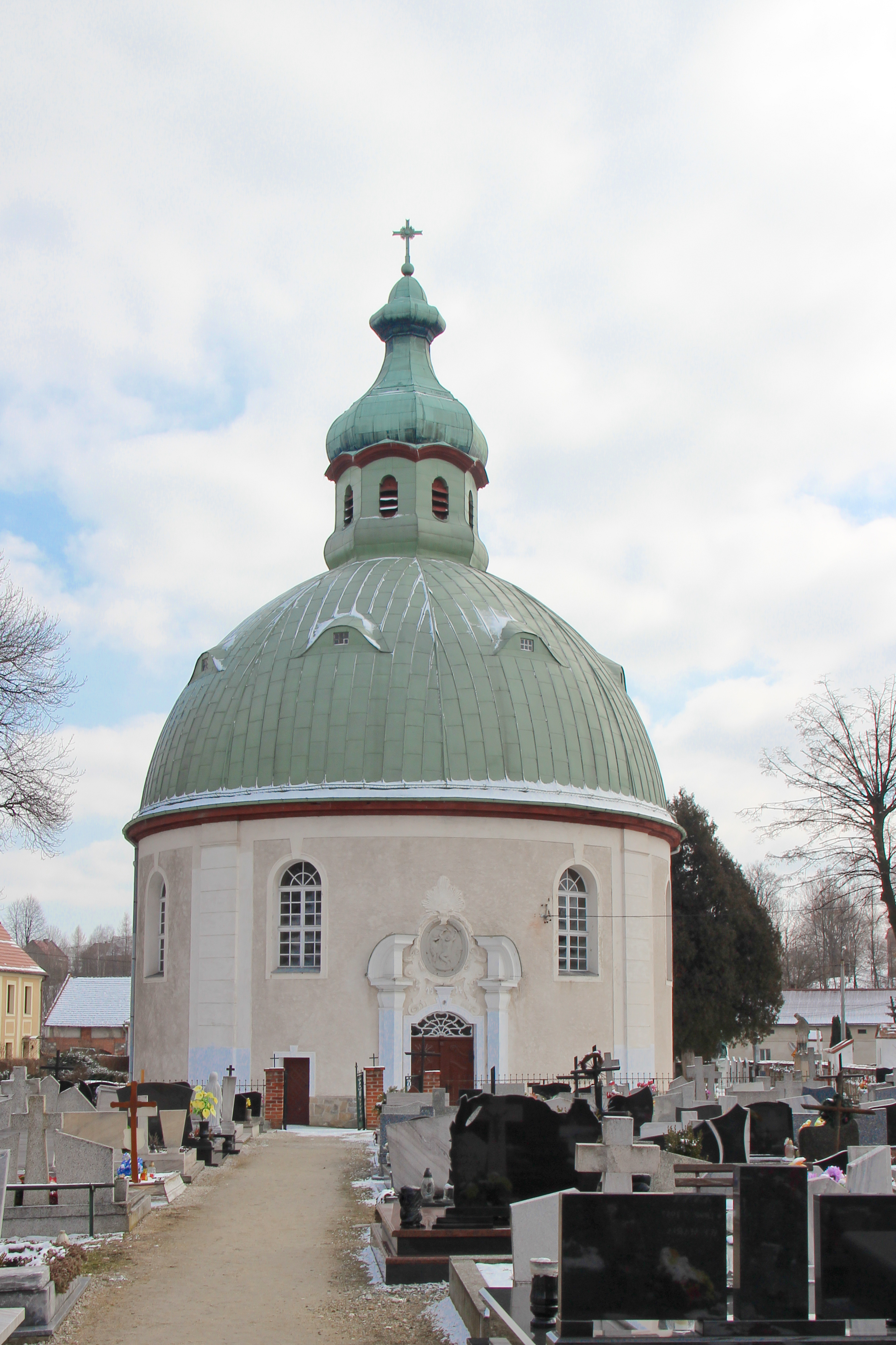
- Saint Bartholomew church in Burgrabice

- Location within Poland
- Coordinates: 50°20′N 17°19′E
- Country: Poland
- Voivodeship: Opole
- County: Nysa
- Gmina: Głuchołazy
- Population: 750
- Time zone: UTC+1 (CET)
  - Summer (DST): UTC+2 (CEST)
- Vehicle registration: ONY

Burgrabice [burɡraˈbit͡sɛ] (German: Borkendorf) is a village in the administrative district of Gmina Głuchołazy, within Nysa County, Opole Voivodeship, in south-western Poland, close to the Czech border. It lies approximately 13 km (8 mi) north-west of Głuchołazy, and 18 km (11 mi) south of Nysa.

== History ==
The village was mentioned as Burgravici in 1284, when it was part of fragmented Piast-ruled Poland. Later on, it was also part of Bohemia (Czechia), Prussia, and Germany. During World War II, the Germans operated the E566 forced labour subcamp of the Stalag VIII-B/344 prisoner-of-war camp in the village. After the defeat of Germany in the war, in 1945, the village became again part of Poland and its historic name was restored.

== Notable residents ==
- Arthur von Briesen (1843–1920), lawyer, president of the Legal Aid Society
