= Christine Ross Barker =

Canadian suffragist and pacifist

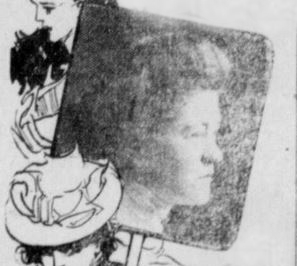
- 1908
- Born: Christine Ross; 2 January 1866; Little Bras d'Or, Cape Breton Island, Nova Scotia, Canada
- Died: 25 June 1940 (aged 74); London, Ontario, Canada
- Other names: Christine R. Barker
- Citizenship: Canadian
- Occupations: suffragist, pacifist, and tax reformer
- Years active: 1904–1938

Christine Ross Barker (2 January 1866 – 25 June 1940) was a Canadian pacifist and suffragist, active in the interwar period. She was a member of the Georgist Movement, serving as president of the Women's Henry George League in Manhattan and was one of the founders and first president of the radical Women's Peace Union.

== Early life ==
Christine Ross was born on 2 January 1866 in Little Bras d'Or on Cape Breton Island, Nova Scotia, Canada to Christina Isabella (née MacKay/McKay) and John Ross. Little is known of her early life, but she moved to New York City and married Wesley E. Barker on 23 December 1903 in Manhattan. Barker was the son of Hersey (née Knowlton) and Wesley E. Barker Sr. of Springfield, Massachusetts. Her husband, known as "Will" was a journalist and a member of the Manhattan Single Tax Club. In 1905 in Manhattan, the couple had a daughter, Mary Ross Barker, who would later become an educator and be honored with the Order of Canada.

== Career ==
Barker became involved in the women's suffrage movement as well as the Women's Henry George League (WHGL) of Manhattan. By 1904, she was speaking on behalf of the league, making presentations with Carrie Chapman Catt and Maud Nathan. By 1905, she had become president of the WHGL, whose object was to replace all forms of taxation with a single tax on resources, i.e. a form of ground rent. She participated in the Progressive Women's Suffrage Union's Parade on Wall Street in Manhattan in 1908, and was one of the members of the organization's executive board. Around 1910, the family moved to North Cambridge, Massachusetts and the following year, they returned to Canada, moving to Toronto. As she had in the United States, Barker became involved in suffragist causes, joining the Canadian Woman Suffrage Association.

During World War I, Barker broke ranks with the business women's club in Toronto, which she headed, because they favored war. Instead, she actively supported the women meeting at The Hague, who would form the Women's International League for Peace and Freedom (WILPF). Though a member of WILPF, Barker felt that they lacked resolve to maintain the fight as pacifists and made compromises for the war by buying war bonds, knitting goods and wrapping bandages. When in 1921, Barker proposed that conference be held in Niagara, Ontario between American and Canadian women to discuss their pacifist aims, she approached the Women's Peace Society (WPS) rather than WILPF to help her organize it. The WPS had split from the WILPF over the same lack of commitment to the cause that troubled Barker. Out of the conference, held between 19 and 21 August, came the creation of the Women's Peace Union, to unite women from Canada, Latin America and the United States to work for peace. Barker served as the first chair, along with Margaret Long Thomas of New York City, who was appointed secretary, and Gertrude Franchot Tone of Niagara Falls, New York, who served as treasurer. The single-purpose of the organization was to pass a constitutional amendment in the United States to outlaw war.

In September 1927, Barker was one of the featured speakers at the Henry George Congress, held in New York City. She not only participated in the Congresses of the society, attending 1934, 1936, and 1938 meetings, but was actively involved in the Henry George School in Toronto. Her husband died on 26 June 1936 two weeks after they had attended the 1936 School Dinner in New York City.

== Death and legacy ==
Barker died on 25 June 1940 in London, Ontario, Canada and was buried in Brookside Cemetery, New Glasgow, Pictou County, Nova Scotia.

== See also ==
- List of peace activists
