= Fundamental rights =

Basic rights protected and upheld by law

Fundamental rights are a group of rights that have been recognized by a high degree of protection from encroachment. These rights are specifically identified in a constitution, or have been found under due process of law. The United Nations' Sustainable Development Goal 17, established in 2015, underscores the link between promoting human rights and sustaining peace.

== List of important rights ==
Some universally recognised rights that are seen as fundamental, i.e., contained in the United Nations Universal Declaration of Human Rights, the U.N. International Covenant on Civil and Political Rights, or the U.N. International Covenant on Economic, Social and Cultural Rights, include the following:

- Self-determination
- Liberty
- Due process of law
- Freedom of movement
- Right to privacy
- Freedom of thought
- Freedom of conscience
- Freedom of religion
- Freedom of expression
- Freedom of assembly
- Freedom of association

== Specific jurisdictions ==
=== Canada ===
In Canada, the Charter of Rights and Freedoms outlines four Fundamental Freedoms. These are freedom of:

- Conscience and religion
- Thought, belief, opinion, and expression, including freedom of the press and other media of communication
- Peaceful assembly
- Association.

=== Europe ===
On a European level, fundamental rights are protected by three laws:

- The Charter of Fundamental Rights of the European Union
- The Fundamental Freedoms of the European Union
- The European Convention on Human Rights

=== Japan ===
In Japan, fundamental rights protected by the Constitution of Japan include:

- Civil liberties, including the right to liberty and the right to freedom of expression, thought, conscience and religion
- Social rights, including the right to receive education and the right to maintain the minimum standards of wholesome and cultured living

=== India ===
There are six fundamental rights recognized in the Constitution of India:

- the right to equality (Articles 14-18):
  - Article 14: Equality before law
  - Article 15: Prohibition of discrimination on grounds of religion, race, caste, sex, or place of birth
  - Article 16: Equality of opportunity in matters of public employment
  - Article 17: Abolition of untouchability
  - Article 18: Abolition of titles
- the right to freedom (Article 19, 22):
  - Article 19: Protection of certain rights regarding freedom of speech, expression, assembly, association, movement, and residence
  - Article 20: Protection in respect of conviction for offenses
  - Article 21: Protection of life and personal liberty
  - Article 21A: Right to education
- the right against exploitation (Articles 23-24):
  - Article 23: Prohibition of trafficking in human beings and forced labor
  - Article 24: Prohibition of child labor
- the right to freedom of religion (Articles 25-28):
  - Article 25: Freedom of conscience and free profession, practice, and propagation of religion
  - Article 26: Freedom to manage religious affairs
  - Article 27: Freedom from payment of taxes for promotion of any particular religion
  - Article 28: Freedom from attending religious instruction or worship in certain educational institutions
- cultural and educational rights (Articles 29-30):
  - Article 29: Protection of interests of minorities
  - Article 30: Right of minorities to establish and administer educational institutions
- the right to constitutional remedies (Article 32 and 226):
  - Article 32: Right to move the Supreme Court for the enforcement of Fundamental Rights
  - Article 226: Power of High Courts to issue certain writs for the enforcement of Fundamental Rights

=== United States ===
Though many fundamental rights are also widely considered human rights, the classification of a right as "fundamental" invokes specific legal tests courts use to determine the constrained conditions under which the United States government and various state governments may limit these rights. In such legal contexts, courts determine whether rights are fundamental by examining the historical foundations of those rights and by determining whether their protection is part of a longstanding tradition. In particular, courts look to whether the right is "so rooted in the traditions and conscience of our people as to be ranked as fundamental." Individual states may guarantee other rights as fundamental. That is, States may add to fundamental rights but can never diminish and rarely infringe upon fundamental rights by legislative processes. Any such attempt, if challenged, may involve a "strict scrutiny" review in court.

In American constitutional law, fundamental rights have special significance under the U.S. Constitution. Those rights enumerated in the U.S. Constitution are recognized as "fundamental" by the U.S. Supreme Court. According to the Supreme Court, enumerated rights that are incorporated are so fundamental that any law restricting such a right must both serve a compelling state purpose and be narrowly tailored to that compelling purpose.

The original interpretation of the United States Bill of Rights was that only the Federal Government was bound by it. In 1835, the U.S. Supreme Court in Barron v. Baltimore unanimously ruled that the Bill of Rights did not apply to the states. During post-Civil War Reconstruction, the Fourteenth Amendment was adopted in 1868 to rectify this condition and to specifically apply the whole of the Constitution to all U.S. states. In 1873, the Supreme Court essentially nullified the key language of the Fourteenth Amendment that guaranteed all "privileges or immunities" to all U.S. citizens, in a series of cases called the Slaughterhouse cases. This decision and others allowed post-emancipation racial discrimination to continue largely unabated.

Later Supreme Court justices found a way around these limitations without overturning the Slaughterhouse precedent: they created a concept called Selective Incorporation. Under this legal theory, the court used the remaining Fourteenth Amendment protections for equal protection and due process to "incorporate" individual elements of the Bill of Rights against the states. "The test usually articulated for determining fundamentality under the Due Process Clause is that the putative right must be 'implicit in the concept of ordered liberty', or 'deeply rooted in this Nation's history and tradition.'" Compare page 267 Lutz v. City of York, Pa., 899 F. 2d 255 - United States Court of Appeals, 3rd Circuit, 1990.

This set in motion a continuous process under which each individual right under the Bill of Rights was incorporated, one by one. That process has extended more than a century, with the free speech clause of the First Amendment first incorporated in 1925 in Gitlow v New York. The most recent amendment completely incorporated as fundamental was the Second Amendment right to keep and bear arms for personal self-defense, in McDonald v Chicago, handed down in 2010 and the Eighth Amendment's restrictions on excessive fines in Timbs v. Indiana in 2019.

Not all clauses of all amendments have been incorporated. For example, states are not required to obey the Fifth Amendment's requirement of indictment by grand jury. Many states choose to use preliminary hearings instead of grand juries. Future cases may incorporate additional clauses of the Bill of Rights against the states.

The Bill of Rights lists specifically enumerated rights. The Supreme Court has extended fundamental rights by recognizing several fundamental rights not specifically enumerated in the Constitution, including but not limited to:

- The right to interstate travel
- The right to parent one's children
- The right to privacy
- The right to marriage

Any restrictions a government statute or policy places on these rights are evaluated with strict scrutiny. If a right is denied to everyone, it is an issue of substantive due process. If a right is denied to some individuals but not others, it is also an issue of equal protection. However, any action that abridges a right deemed fundamental, when also violating equal protection, is still held to the more exacting standard of strict scrutiny, instead of the less demanding rational basis test.

During the Lochner era, the right to freedom of contract was considered fundamental, and thus restrictions on that right were subject to strict scrutiny. Following the 1937 Supreme Court decision in West Coast Hotel Co. v. Parrish, though, the right to contract became considerably less important in the context of substantive due process and restrictions on it were evaluated under the rational basis standard.

== See also ==
- Fundamental Rights Agency of the European Union
- Inalienable rights
- Universal human rights
