= Fay Fuller =

American journalist (1869–1958)

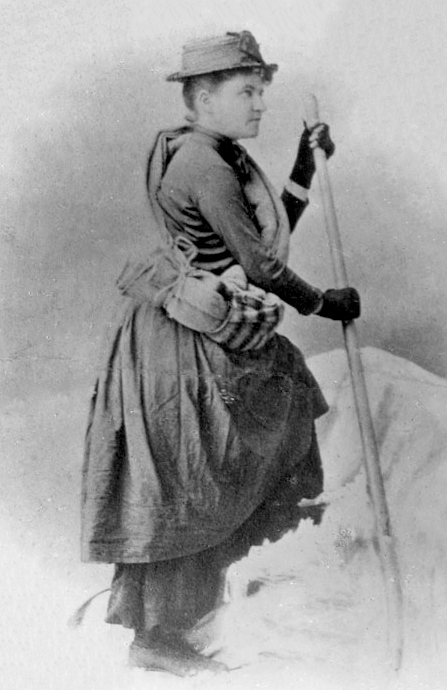
- Pictured around 1890
- Born: Edwina Fay Fuller; October 10, 1869; New Jersey
- Died: May 27, 1958 (aged 88); Santa Monica, California
- Burial place: Sleepy Hollow Cemetery
- Occupations: Journalist, mountaineer and schoolteacher
- Organization(s): Washington Alpine Club, Tacoma Alpine Club, Mazamas mountaineering club
- Known for: First woman to summit Mount Rainier
- Spouse: Fritz von Briesen
- Parent(s): Ann E. and Edward N. Fuller
- Relatives: Arthur von Briesen (father in law)
- Honours: Fay Peak

Edwina Fay Fuller (Note: Older sources record her first name as Edwina; modern sources state that it was Evelyn. In most publications during her life, she was referred to as Fay.) (October 10, 1869 – May 27, 1958) was an American journalist, mountaineer and schoolteacher. In 1890 she became the first woman to reach the summit of Mount Rainier.

== Biography ==
Fay Fuller was born in 1869 in New Jersey to Ann E. and Edward N. Fuller. In 1882, when Fuller was 12 years old, her family relocated to Tacoma, Washington, where she began to explore the wilderness. After graduating from high school, Fuller began teaching at the age of 15, eventually moving to work in Yelm, Washington. While teaching in Yelm, her school was visited by P. B. Van Trump, one of the first climbers to ascend Mount Rainier, with whom she became friends and who would inspire her to climb Rainier herself.

=== Mount Rainier ===
Fuller made her first attempt on Rainier in 1887 at age 18, reaching an elevation of approximately 8,600 feet (2,600 m) and setting a goal to someday "climb to the summit of the great peak". In 1890 she was invited by Van Trump to join a climbing party for a second attempt at climbing the mountain. On the afternoon of August 10, she and four teammates reached Columbia Crest, Rainier's highest summit, making her the first woman to have climbed the mountain. The next climbing party on the mountain found Fuller's hair pins on the route and joked that this proved "a woman really had made it to the summit".

=== Journalism ===
Fuller gave up teaching to become a journalist like her father, an editor of several Tacoma newspapers, with whom she found her first reporting job as the first female reporter for the Tacoma Ledger. Following her successful ascent of Mount Rainier, she was given a column titled "Mountain Murmurs" in which she covered mountaineering social events near Paradise, Washington and accounts by earlier climbers of Rainier. She also played a significant role in developing the Pacific Northwest climbing community: she helped to found the Washington Alpine Club in 1891, the Tacoma Alpine Club in 1893, and the Mazamas mountaineering club in Portland, Oregon in 1894.

=== Later life and legacy ===
Fuller left Tacoma in 1900 to continue her career in journalism in Chicago, Washington, D.C., and New York City. In New York, she met and married Fritz von Briesen, an attorney. They later moved to Santa Monica, California. After inheriting land from her father in law after his death, Mrs. von Briesen donated it to the city of New York, which became Von Briesen Park. Fuller died in 1958 at the age of 88.

Fay Peak in Mount Rainier National Park was named after her. In 2021, Fuller was inducted into the Tacoma-Pierce County Sports Hall of Fame.
