= Alexander Forger =

American lawyer (1923–2025)

- Born: Alexander Darrow Forger; February 19, 1923; New York City, U.S.
- Died: March 9, 2025 (aged 102); White Plains, New York, U.S.
- Education: Princeton University (AB); Yale Law School (LLB)
- Occupation: Lawyer
- Political party: Democratic
- Spouses: Nancy Brabant (m. 1946; died 1993); Fern Schair (m. 1995; died 2023)

Alexander Darrow Forger (February 19, 1923 – March 9, 2025) was an American lawyer from New York City.

== Life and career ==
After infantry service with the United States Army in the European theatre of World War II, he received degrees from Princeton University and Yale Law School, and, after graduating, he was hired by Milbank, Tweed, Hope & Webb. Becoming a partner at Milbank in 1958, he was a prominent trust and estate lawyer for several decades, notably representing Jacqueline Kennedy Onassis and Rachel Lambert Mellon, and he chaired the firm's executive committee from 1984 to 1992.

From 1980 to 1981, Forger was president of the New York State Bar Association as well as a member of the American Bar Association (ABA)'s House of Delegates. He was The Legal Aid Society's president from 1977 to 1979 and was chair of its board of directors from 1984 to 1993. From 1994 to 1997, he was president of the Legal Services Corporation. He was especially passionate about advocacy on behalf of the LGBTQ community and individuals with HIV/AIDS, citing discrimination he witnessed against his gay son and by policymakers throughout his career. In 2011, the ABA established the Alexander D. Forger Awards, given annually to "celebrate lawyers and legal service providers who have demonstrated a sustained commitment to the advancement of the rule of law for individuals living with HIV and the provision of direct legal services to individuals affected by HIV".

Forger died at his residence in White Plains, New York, on March 9, 2025, at the age of 102.

Business positions
Preceded by Francis Musselman	Chair of the Executive Committee of Milbank, Tweed, Hadley & McCloy; 1984–1992	Succeeded by Frank Logan
Non-profit organization positions
Preceded by Robert McKay	President of The Legal Aid Society; 1977–1979	Succeeded by
Preceded by Anthony R. Palermo	President of the New York State Bar Association; 1980–1981	Succeeded by David S. Williams
Preceded by John P. O'Hara	President of the Legal Services Corporation; 1994–1997	Succeeded by Martha Bergmark
