= Elinor Byrns =

American lawyer

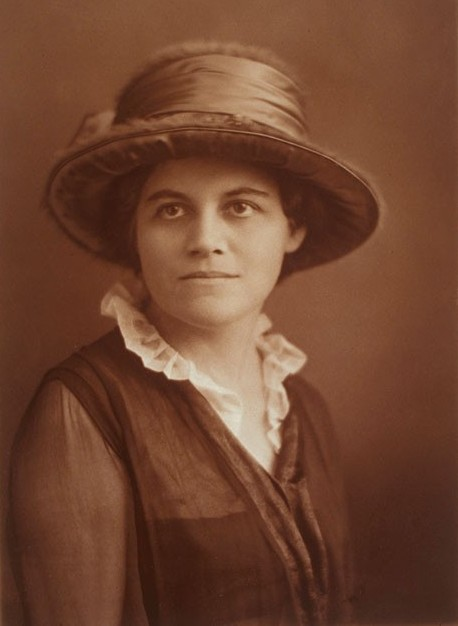
- Born: 1876; Lafayette, Indiana
- Died: May 27, 1957 (aged 80–81)
- Education: University of Chicago, New York University
- Occupations: Lawyer, Suffragist

Elinor Byrns (1876 — May 27, 1957) was an American lawyer, pacifist, and feminist, co-founder of the Women's Peace Society and the Women's Peace Union.

== Early life and education ==
Elinor Byrns was born in Lafayette, Indiana in 1876, attended the Girls' Classical School in Indianapolis, and graduated from the University of Chicago in 1900. She earned her law degree at New York University.

== Career ==
Byrns worked at a corporate law firm in New York City for two years, until she left in disillusionment at how the law was practiced. She drew from the experience for her 1916 essay in The New Republic, titled "The Woman Lawyer," declaring, "I do not want to practise law if it means playing a game."

== Activism ==
Byrns was active in New York City's feminist circles in the 1910s, as a member of Heterodoxy, and helping to plan the first suffrage parade on Fifth Avenue. She was active with the College Equal Suffrage League of New York State, and promoted the idea of "suffrage colleges," training for young women interested in pursuing activism. She was national publicity director of the National American Woman Suffrage Association until she resigned in 1917, over the organization's support for World War I. She resigned from the Women's International League for Peace and Freedom around the same time.

Having parted with the mainstream feminist organizations, Byrns focused her energies on pacifism, as vice-chair of the Women's Peace Society, formed in 1919, and co-founder of the Women's Peace Union in 1921. In 1923, she and Caroline Lexow Babcock drafted a constitutional amendment to remove the power of the US Congress to declare or fund war. Byrns was also on the executive committee of the War Resisters League in 1924.

Byrns explained the motivation behind her peace work, at a U. S. Senate hearing in 1927:

A government which learns to respect life will be a sane government, realizing the folly and wickedness of permitting, much less of forcing, its citizens to indulge in the abnormality of war. It will know that life, in itself valuable, can be made rich and beautiful. It will understand that its citizens can never reach the highest point of development unless they abandon such ugly practices as killing, and the violation of the personality of others, and concentrate rather on creative, constructive activities.

== Death ==
Byrns died in 1957, age 80.
