= Caroline Lexow Babcock =

American pacifist and suffragist

- Born: Caroline Lexow; February 5, 1882; Nyack, New York, US
- Died: March 8, 1980 (aged 98); Nyack, New York, US
- Education: Barnard College
- Occupations: Pacifist, Suffragist
- Spouse: Philip Westerly Babcock (m. 1915)

Caroline Lexow Babcock (February 5, 1882 – March 8, 1980) was an American pacifist and suffragist, co-founder of the Women's Peace Union, and Executive Secretary of the National Woman's Party from 1938 to 1946.

== Early life and education ==
Caroline Lexow was born in 1882 in Nyack, New York, the daughter of lawyer and legislator Clarence Lexow, noted for the anti-corruption Lexow Committee probe, and the former Katherine Morton. Caroline's grandfather Rudolph Lexow was a prominent German-American writer and editor. Caroline Lexow attended Barnard College, graduating in 1904.

== Career and activism ==
After college Caroline Lexow became active full-time in the suffrage movement, as executive secretary assisting Harriot Stanton Blatch in running the Women's Political Union, as president of the College Equal Suffrage League of New York, and as executive secretary of the National College Equal Suffrage League. "On the day of my graduation," she told audiences while touring as a suffrage organizer in 1909, "I became actively interested in suffrage work and a member of the League, and I expect to devote the most of my time to the cause until it wins."

In 1921, Babcock was one of the members of the Women's Peace Society who left to start the Women's Peace Union. In that same year, she chaired a women's peace march in New York City. Babcock and Elinor Byrns drafted a constitutional amendment calling for the power to declare or prepare for war to be removed from the powers of the U. S. Congress. She included the Boy Scouts among her targets, calling scouting a "kindergarten for war."

Caroline Lexow Babcock was on the Executive Committee and board of directors of the Birth Control Federation of America.

== Personal life and legacy ==
Caroline Lexow married Philip Westerly Babcock in 1915. They had three children together, Caroline, Philip, and Katharine. Caroline Lexow Babcock died in 1980, still wearing a button supporting the Equal Rights Amendment.

Caroline L. Babcock's papers are archived with those of Olive E. Hurlburt in the Arthur and Elizabeth Schlesinger Library on the History of Women in America at Harvard University. Another significant set of Babcock's letters are in the Harriot Stanton Blatch Collection at Vassar College.

A Caroline Lexow Babcock Award has been given out by the Rockland County National Organization for Women.
