= Legal Aid Society of the District of Columbia =

U.S. non-profit organization

The Legal Aid Society of the District of Columbia
- Founded: 1932
- Type: Non-profit
- Location: Washington, D.C., U.S.
- Services: Legal representation, class action litigation
- Fields: Legal services to the indigent
- Executive Director: Vikram Swaruup
- Key people: Eric Angel
- Website: legalaiddc.org/

The Legal Aid Society of the District of Columbia is the oldest and largest civil legal aid organization in Washington, D.C.

Created in 1932, the Legal Aid Society provides representation and legal services to indigent residents of the District of Columbia in areas like domestic violence (including restraining orders), housing, public benefits, and consumer law. During the recession of 2008 to 2009, the Legal Aid Society managed to expand legal services even as gifts from lawyers and law firms declined 15 to 20 percent. In 2014, it provided legal services to approximately 8,800 indigent Washingtonians. In 2017, it filed a lawsuit in federal court alleging widespread problems with the District’s food stamp program.

== See also ==
- Public Defender Service for the District of Columbia
- Legal Aid Society (New York City)
- Legal Aid Society of Cleveland
