= Mother Mountain (Washington) =

Mountain in Washington (state), United States

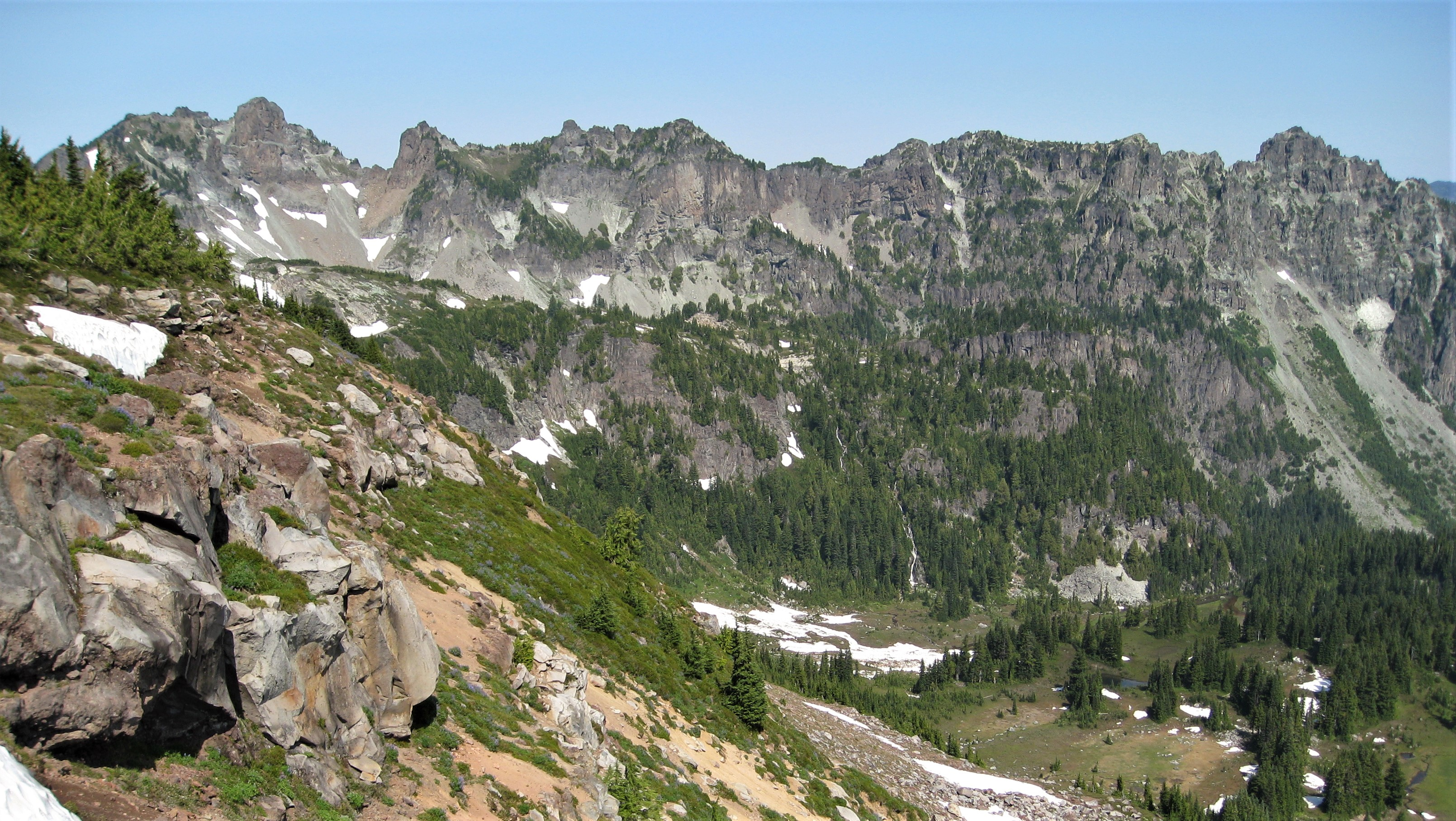
- Mother Mountain, south aspect

Highest point
- Elevation: 6,480 ft (1,975 m)
- Prominence: 280 ft (85 m)
- Parent peak: East Fay Peak (6520+ ft)
- Isolation: 0.43 mi (0.69 km)
- Coordinates: 46°56′19″N 121°50′32″W

Geography
- Location within Washington (state) Location within the United States
- Country: United States
- State: Washington
- County: Pierce
- Protected area: Mount Rainier National Park
- Parent range: Cascades
- Topo map: USGS Mowich Lake

Climbing
- Easiest route: scrambling

Mother Mountain is a 6,480+ ft (1,980+ m) multi-summit, 3-mile long ridge-like mountain located in Mount Rainier National Park, in Pierce County of Washington state. It is part of the Cascade Range, and lies 7 mi (11 km) northwest of the summit of Mount Rainier. The Wonderland Trail provides one approach option to this mountain, and the summit offers views of Mount Rainier. East Fay Peak is its nearest higher neighbor, 0.42 mi (0.68 km) to the south. Precipitation runoff from Mother Mountain is drained by Cataract Creek on the south side of the mountain, and Ipsut Creek drains the north side of it, and both are tributaries of the Carbon River. The west side drains into Mowich Lake, and thence Mowich River.

== History ==
The name Mother Mountain derives from the figure of a woman which can be seen silhouetted along the northeast summit of the ridge. The toponym was officially adopted in 1913 by the United States Board on Geographic Names. The first ascent of Second Mother Mountain (6,375-ft) was made in 1938 by Maynard Miller and H. Kinzner.

== Geology ==
This geological formation was formed by successive lava flows erupting from broad, low volcanos less than 25 million years ago. Large cirques on the north aspect once held voluminous glaciers during the Pleistocene.

== Climate ==
Mother Mountain is located in the marine west coast climate zone of western North America. Most weather fronts originating in the Pacific Ocean travel northeast toward the Cascade Mountains. As fronts approach, they are forced upward by the peaks of the Cascade Range (orographic lift), causing them to drop their moisture in the form of rain or snow onto the Cascades. As a result, the west side of the Cascades experiences high precipitation, especially during the winter months in the form of snowfall. Because of maritime influence, snow tends to be wet and heavy, resulting in high avalanche danger. During winter months, weather is usually cloudy, but due to high pressure systems over the Pacific Ocean that intensify during summer months, there is often little or no cloud cover during the summer. The months July through September offer the most favorable weather for viewing or climbing this peak.

== See also ==
- Geology of the Pacific Northwest

== Gallery ==
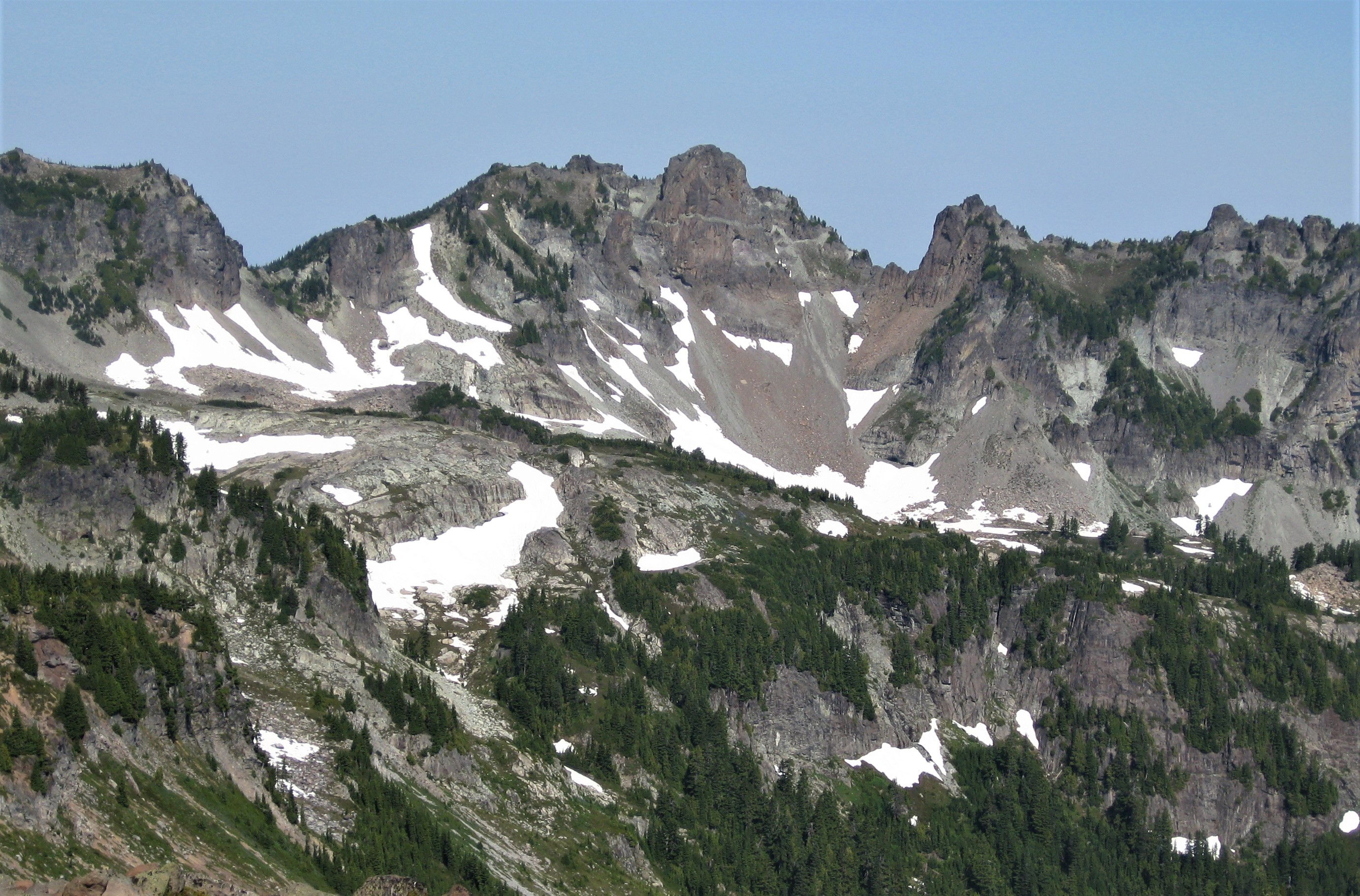
First Mother Mountain

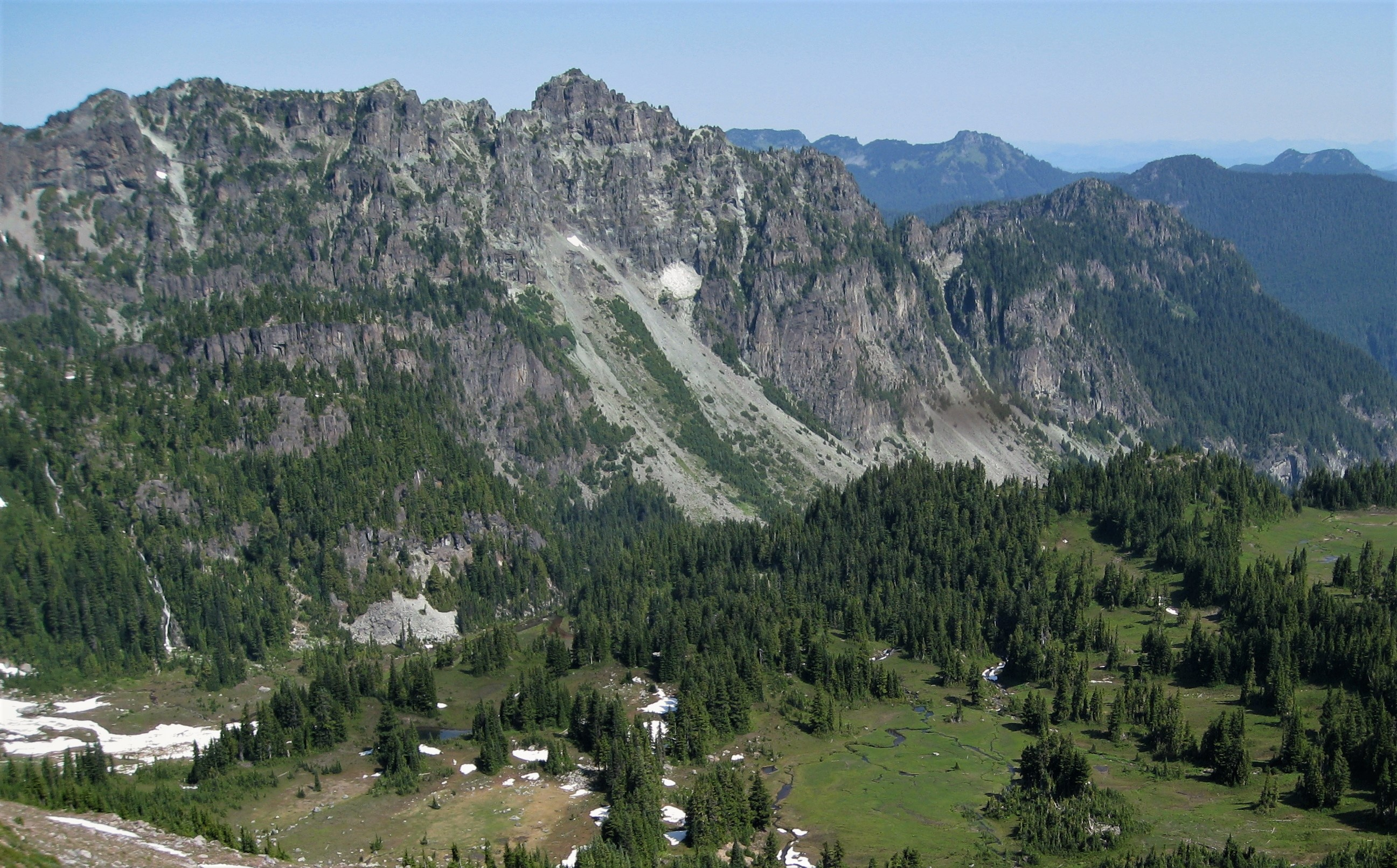
Second Mother Mountain centered, Third Mother to right

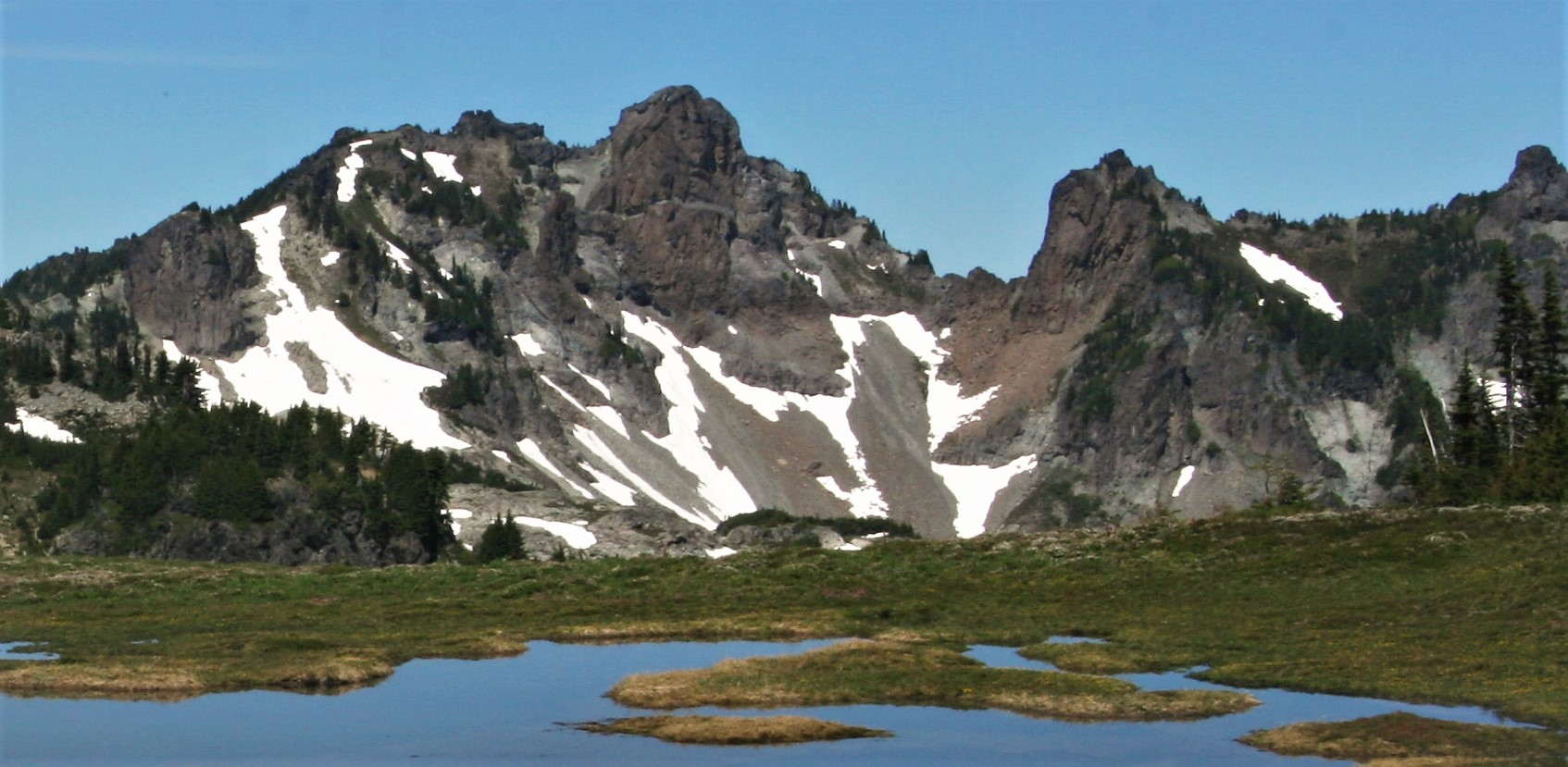
Mother Mountain

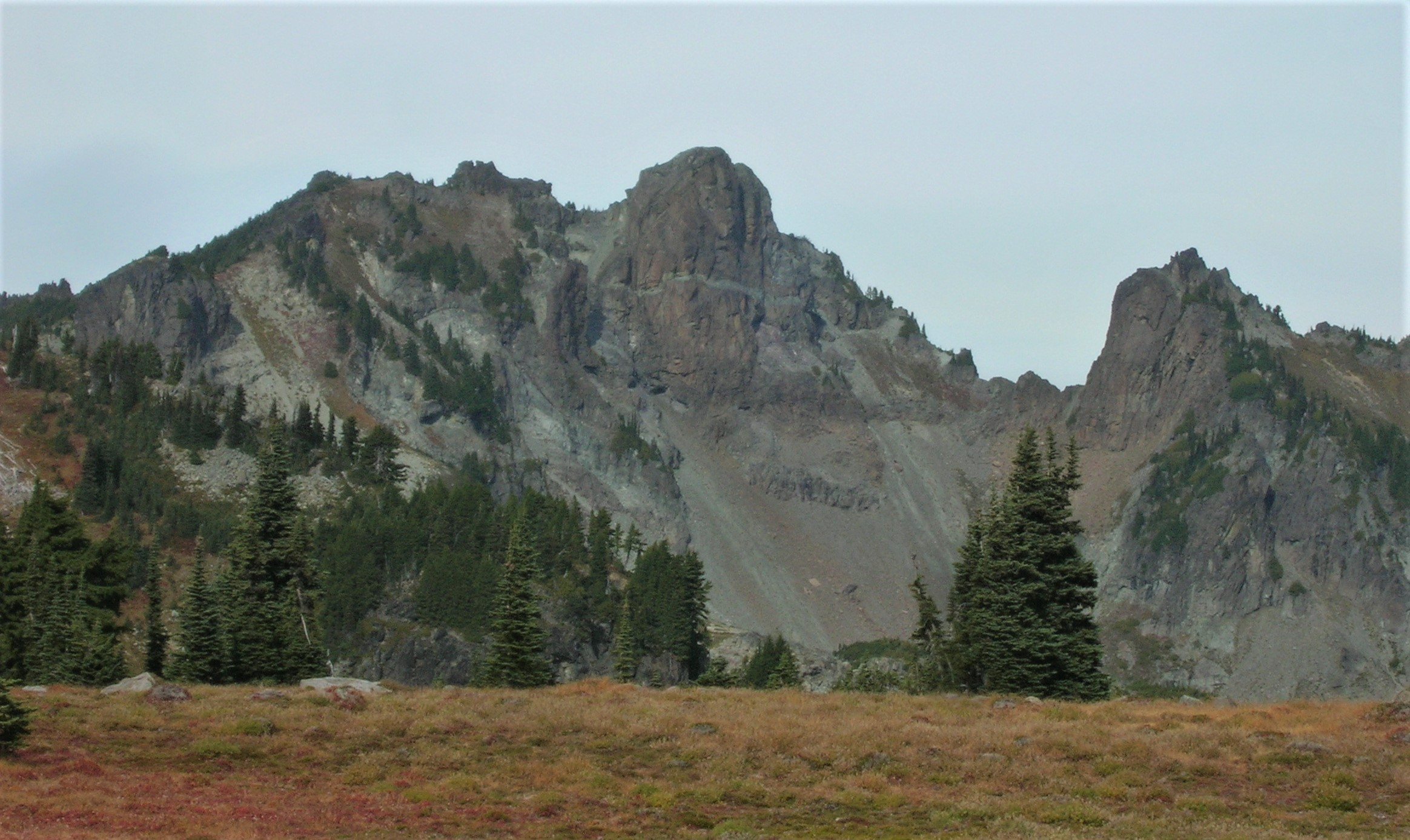
from Spray Park
