= Village of Belle Terre v. Boraas =

- Supreme Court of the United States

Argued February 19–20, 1974 Decided April 1, 1974
- Full case name: Village of Belle Terre, et al., v. Bruce Boraas, et al.
- Citations: 416 U.S. 1 (more) 94 S. Ct. 1536; 39 L. Ed. 2d 797; 6 ERC 1417

Case history
- Prior: Appeal from the United States Court of Appeals for the Second Circuit (Boraas v. Village of Belle Terre, 476 F.2d 806 (2d Cir. 1973))

Holding
- An ordinance restricting land use to “one-family” dwellings did not involve a procedural disparity, did not deprive any group of a fundamental right, and is rationally related to a permissible government objective.

Court membership
- Chief Justice Warren E. Burger Associate Justices William O. Douglas · William J. Brennan Jr. Potter Stewart · Byron White; Thurgood Marshall · Harry Blackmun; Lewis F. Powell Jr. · William Rehnquist

Case opinions
- Majority: Douglas, joined by Burger, Stewart, White, Blackmun, Powell, Rehnquist
- Dissent: Brennan
- Dissent: Marshall

Laws applied
- U.S. Const. amend. XIV

Village of Belle Terre v. Boraas, 416 U.S. 1 (1974), is a United States Supreme Court case in which the Court upheld the constitutionality of a residential zoning ordinance in Belle Terre, New York, allowing a restrictive definition of family that prevented unrelated college students from residing in a single-family dwelling.

== Background ==
Belle Terre is an incorporated village on the North Shore of Long Island. The village only permitted one-family residencies. Six students studying at Stony Brook University rented a home in the village. None of them were related in any way, so their living situation violated the ordinance. The District Court found the ordinance constitutional. The defendants moved out of the house during proceedings.

== Second Circuit Decision ==
The Court of Appeals for the Second Circuit found that the ordinance was unconstitutional and violated the students' rights under the Equal Protection Clause of the 14th Constitutional Amendment. This reversed the District Court's judgement.

== Supreme Court Decision ==
In a 7–2 decision, the Supreme Court ruled in favor of the Village of Belle Terre and found that the ordinance was constitutional.

=== Majority opinion ===
William O. Douglas delivered the opinion of the court. The court stated that ordinance involved no procedural disparities or any deprivation of a fundamental right. The court also decided that the tenants moving out during court proceedings was irrelevant.

=== Dissent ===
A dissent was delivered by Thurgood Marshall. He believed that the ordinance violated the First Amendment rights to freedom of association.

=== Dissent ===
Another dissent was delivered by William J. Brennan Jr. based on the fact that the tenants had moved out and therefore had no cognizable case. This arises from the issue of mootness, which requires that an actual controversy must exist at all stages of review, not merely at the time it was filed.

== See also ==
Moore v. East Cleveland, 431 U.S. 494 (1977)
