= Mazamas =

Mountaineering organization based in Portland, Oregon, United States

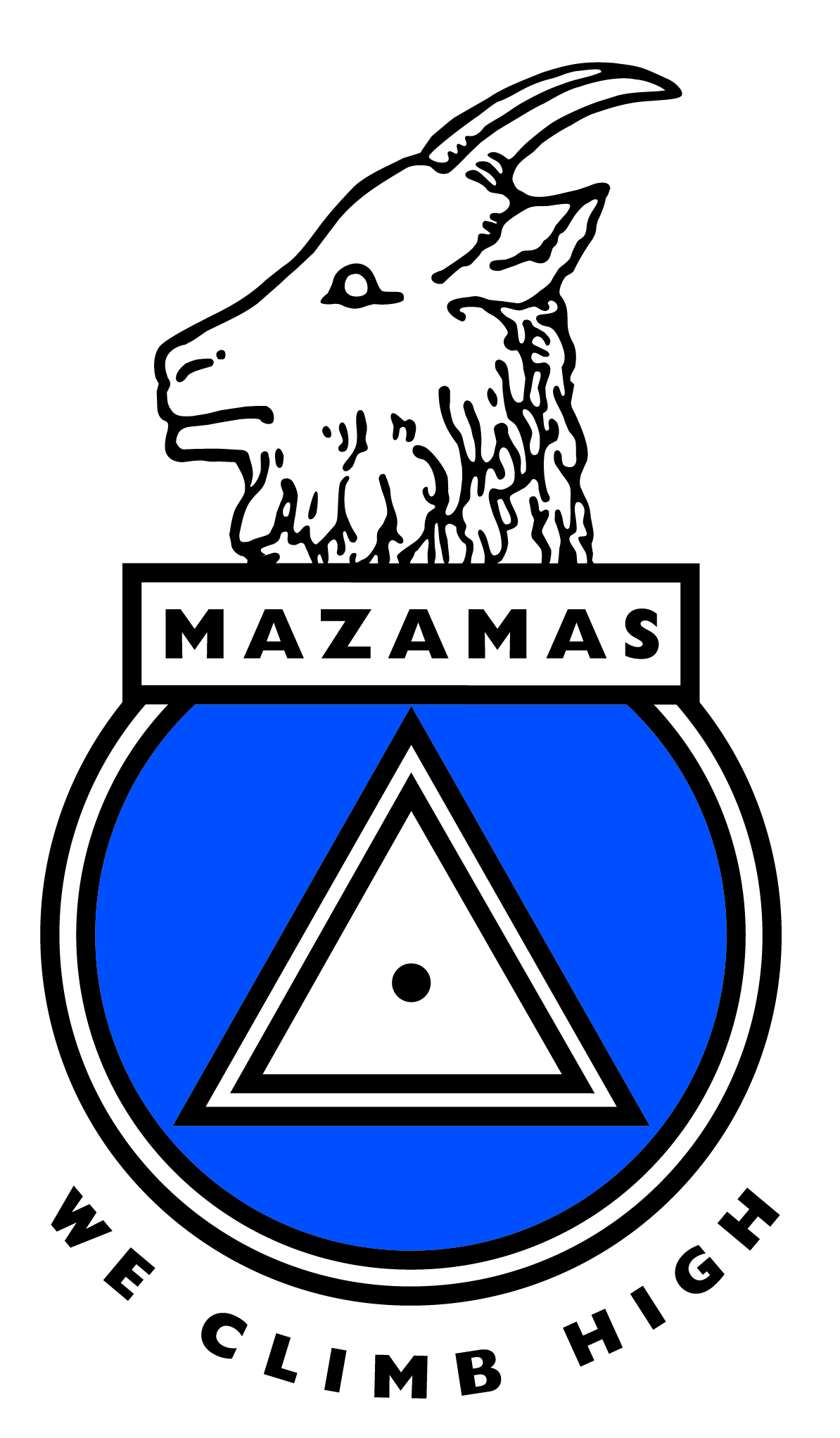

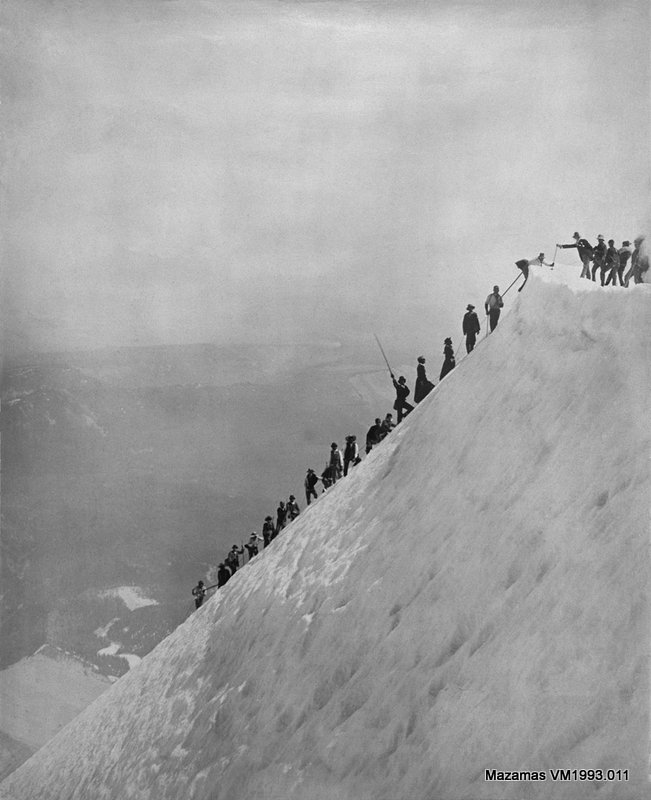
- A group of climbers ascending Cooper Spur, Mount Hood, July 19, 1894.
- Formation: July 19, 1894; 132 years ago
- Founder: W. G. Steel and others
- Founded at: Mount Hood, Oregon, US
- Type: Non-profit mountaineering organization
- Tax ID no.: 93-0408077
- Legal status: 501(c)(3), NTEE Code C60
- Headquarters: Portland, Oregon
- Region served: Oregon, Cascade Range
- Products: Mazamas Bulletin
- Website: mazamas.org

The Mazamas (/məˈzɑːməz/) is a mountaineering organization based in Portland, Oregon, United States, founded in 1894.

== Promotion of mountaineering ==
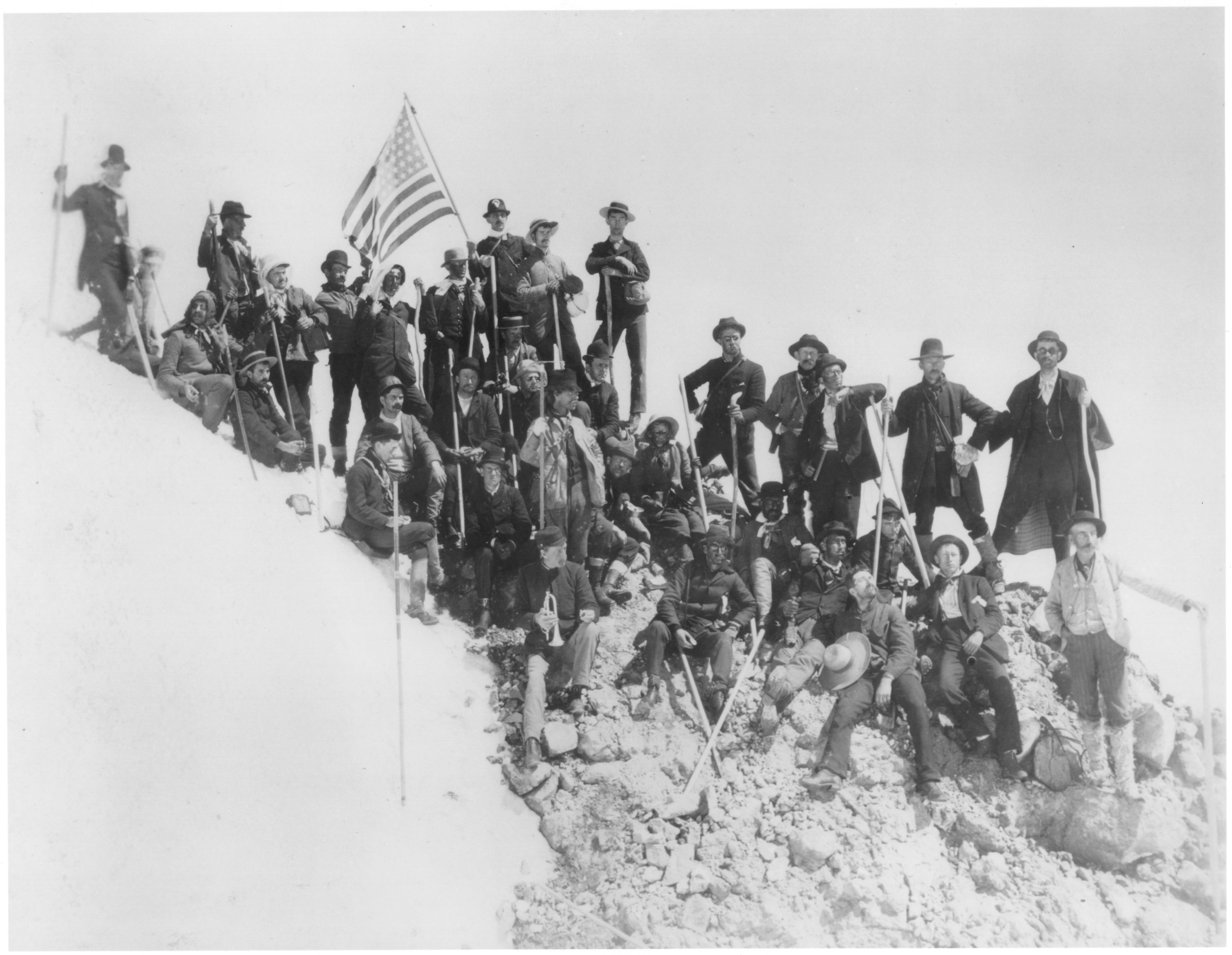
Mazamas on the summit of Mount Hood, July 19, 1894.

The Mazamas has been an important part of the climbing community in the Pacific Northwest of the United States since its founding. The Mazamas was the second mountaineering organization in the Pacific Northwest, following the Oregon Alpine Club. The Mountaineers of Seattle, Washington, which began in 1906 as an auxiliary of the Mazamas, is similar in its aims and activities to the Mazamas.

The Mazamas offers more than 900 hikes and 350 climbs annually for more than 13,000 participants. A variety of classes and activities are offered for every skill and fitness level and are open to both members and nonmembers. The group also promotes mountaineering through education, climbing, hiking, fellowship, safety, and the protection of mountain environments.

== Founding ==
On July 19, 1894, more than 350 people assembled near the hamlet of Government Camp at the base of Mount Hood. Despite the nasty weather, 155 men and 38 women reached the summit, where they elected William G. Steel as the society's first president. With 105 charter members, the Mazamas became the fifth active mountaineering club in the United States at that time. The founders set four goals for the organization:

1. to explore snow-capped peaks and other mountains,
2. to collect scientific knowledge about the mountain environment,
3. to preserve the natural beauty of forests and mountains,
4. and to share that knowledge with others in the Pacific Northwest.

Prominent founding members included J. Francis Drake, Martin W. Gorman, Francis C. Little, Charles H. Sholes, Henry Pittock, Rodney Glisan, Fay Fuller, Oliver C. Yocum, and Lander L. Hawkins. Early honorary members included the naturalist and conservationist John Muir, photographer Edward Curtis, financier Edward Harriman, and President Theodore Roosevelt.

== Conservation ==
In 1895, Steel and the Mazamas lobbied to prevent development in the Cascade Range Forest Reserve. A few years later, in 1902, they rallied to limit the destructive effects of sheep grazing in the Northwest. In 1928, the Mazamas entered a prolonged battle against the proposed Mount Hood Tramway, and four years later they were instrumental in forming the Federation of Western Outdoor Clubs. The Mazamas advocated against the development of a tramway on Mount Rainier and development in Olympic National Park and for the creation of Forest Park in Portland, and the Wilderness Act of 1964.

== Scientific research ==
The public's interest in scientific exploration drove early mountaineering. It was almost unheard of for mountaineers to undertake a climb without a barometer, mapping instruments, or other scientific equipment. The Mazamas were no different, embracing scientific research from the get-go. Mazama members documented the flora, fauna, geology, and glaciology of the majority of Northwest peaks. In the 1930s, the Mazama began surveying glaciers and documenting how they changed from year to year.

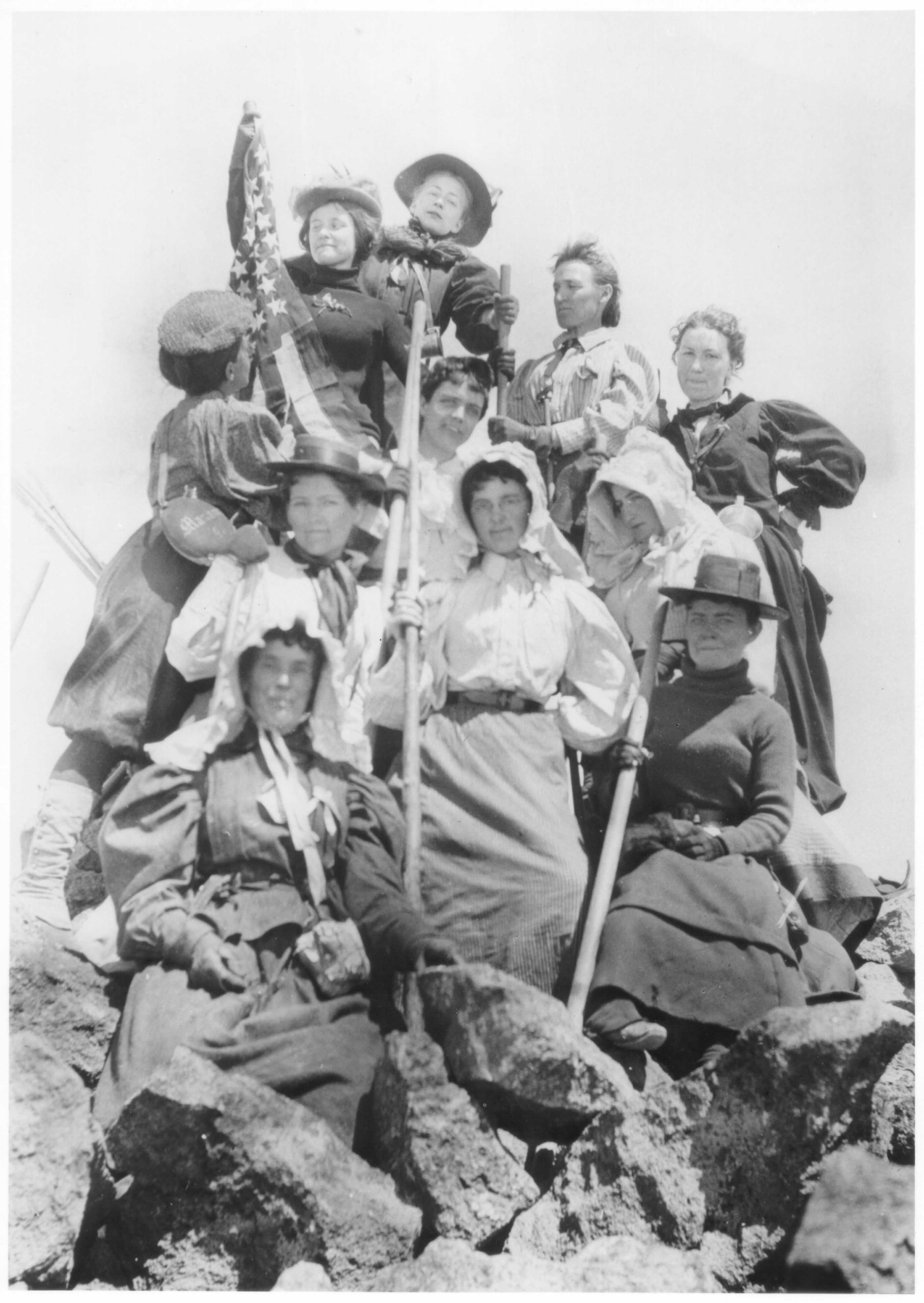
Mazama women on the summit of Mt. McLoughlin, Aug. 16, 1896.

== Role of women ==
William Steel remarked, “No climb is complete without them” when asked about women and mountaineering. From the very beginning, the Mazamas have welcomed women as full members. At the time, this was uncommon. The Mazamas and Oregon were ahead of the times. Oregon adopted women's suffrage in 1912, followed nationally by the 19th amendment in 1920. A few dates:

- 1895, the organization's first two vice-presidents were women;
- 1917, first Mazama climb led by a woman;
- 1932, first all female climb;
- 1954, first female Mazama president.

From the 1890s on, women hiked and climbed in the Pacific Northwest. While they were bound by the constraints of fashion on Main street, they found ingenious ways of getting around those rules on the mountain.

== Name ==
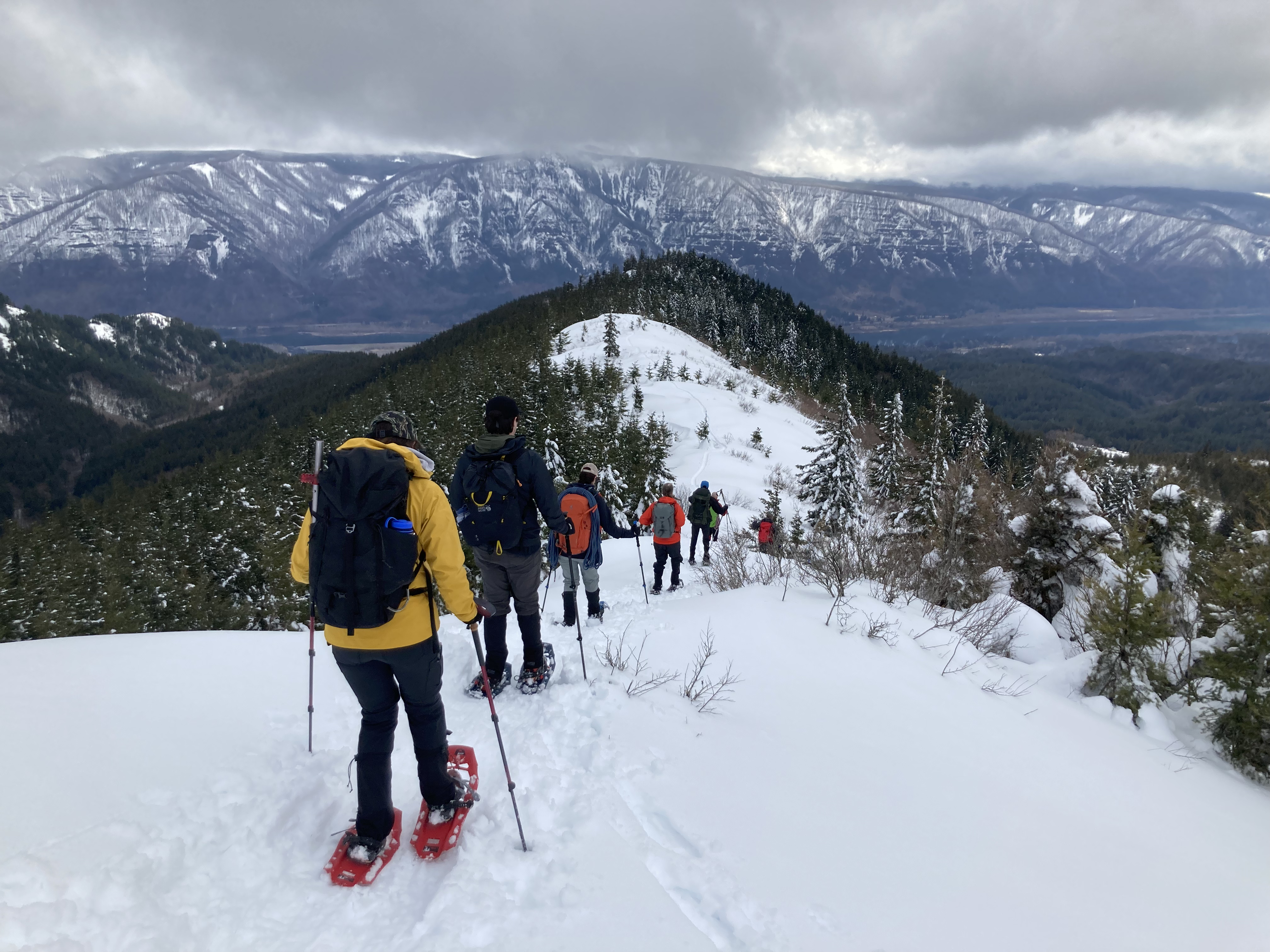
A Mazamas class snowshoes down Hardy Ridge in Beacon Rock State Park

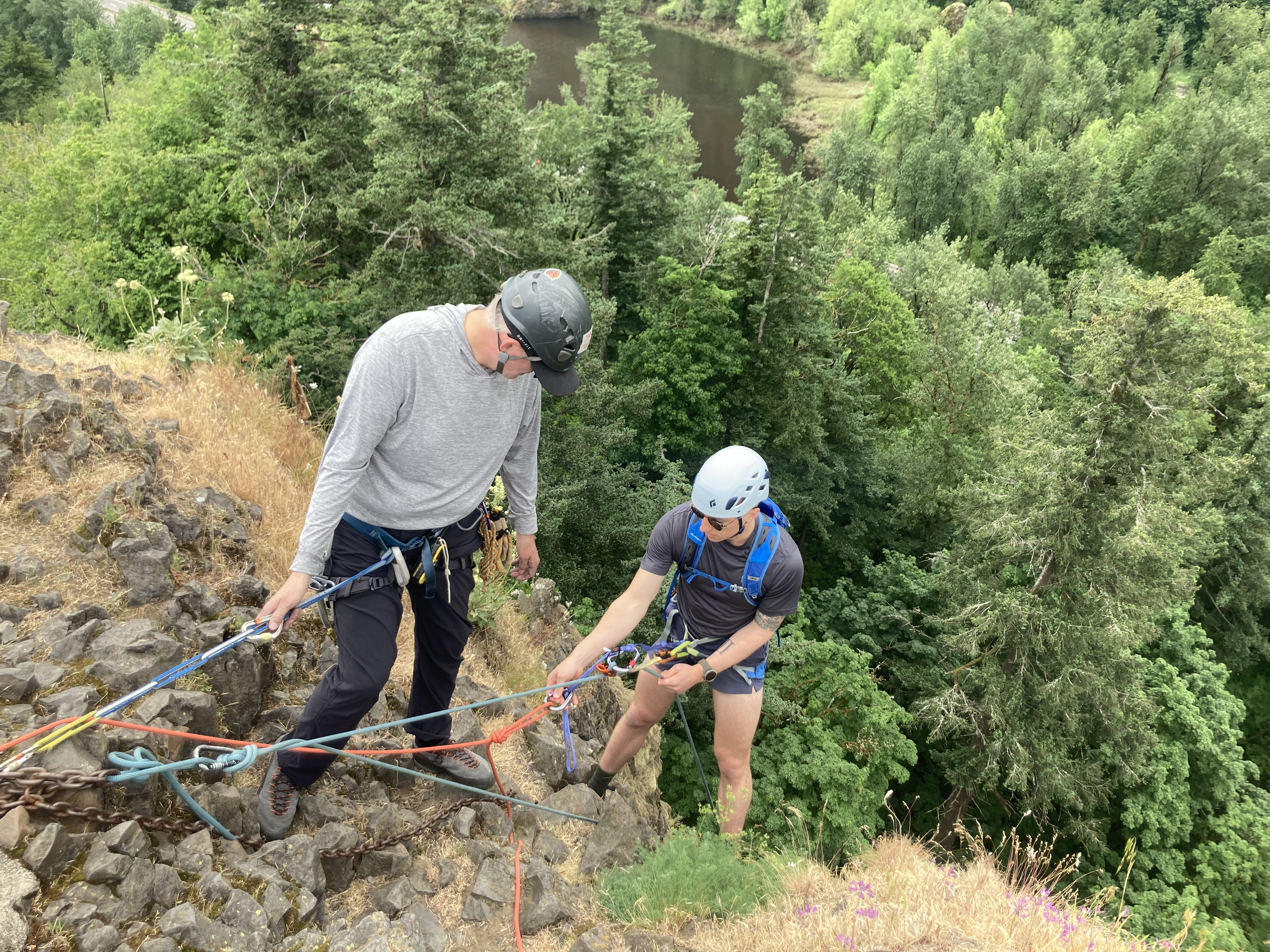
Climber prepares to rappel under supervision on a Mazamas climb of Rooster Rock

The name Mazamas means mountain goat, from Nahuatl mazatl, deer. Mount Mazama, the collapsed volcano that formed Crater Lake, is located in Oregon and was named after the organization on August 21, 1896, while on their annual outing. They also named the Mazama Glacier on Mount Adams and the Mazama Glacier on Mount Baker after themselves in 1895 and 1907 respectively.

== See also ==
- Ella E. McBride
- Fay Fuller
- Edward S. Curtis
- Henry Pittock
- 1973 Mazamas Aconcagua expedition
