= Archibald R. Murray =

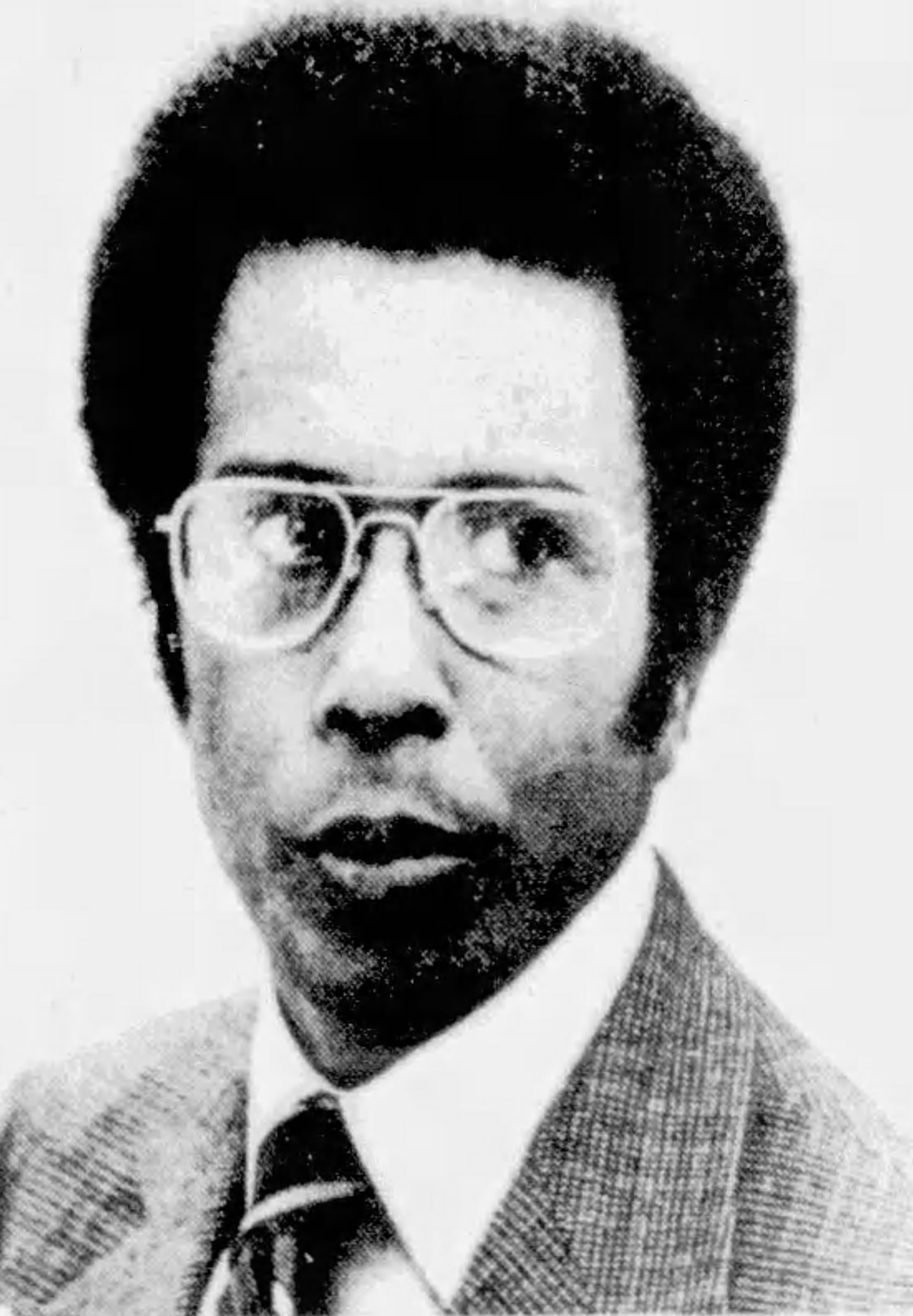
- Murray in 1977
- Born: August 25, 1933 Barbados
- Died: September 16, 2001 (aged 68) New York, New York, U.S.

Archibald R. Murray (August 25, 1933 – September 16, 2001) was an American lawyer born in Barbados, who was the first African-American Attorney-in-Chief of The Legal Aid Society, the first African-American President of the New York State Bar Association, and the second African-American Chairman of the executive committee of the New York City Bar Association.

Murray immigrated to the United States in 1950, earning his bachelor's degree from Howard University in 1954 and his Bachelor of Laws (LL.B.) degree from Fordham University School of Law in 1960. Upon graduation from law school he became an Assistant District Attorney in New York County (Manhattan). In 1962, he became assistant counsel to Gov. Nelson A. Rockefeller of New York. From 1965 to 1967, he was in private practice in New York City, then became counsel to the New York State Crime Control Council until 1971.

Murray served as Commissioner of the State of New York's Division of Criminal Justice Services from 1972 to 1974. On January 1, 1975, he began a lengthy career at The Legal Aid Society, serving from 1975 to 1994 as Attorney-in-Chief and executive director, and later as chairman of the board until 1998. Murray was said to have "helped to raise the standard of the free legal advice provided for poor and indigent defendants facing criminal charges in New York City."

He died on September 16, 2001, in New York City, survived by his wife of 40 years, Kay Crawford Murray.

== Honors ==
During his lifetime, Murray was awarded honorary Doctor of Laws degrees from New York Law School (1988), John Jay College of Criminal Justice (City University of New York) (1990), and Fordham University (1992).

Murray's alma mater, Fordham University School of Law, has established both an Archibald R. Murray Public Service Award and an Archibald R. Murray Professorship. The former is awarded to students in the graduating class of the law school who have devoted 50 or more hours to pro bono and/or community service work during their years as Fordham law students. Those graduates completing 250–499 hours receive the cum laude Murray Award, those completing 500–999 hours the magna cum laude Murray Award, and students completing 1000+ hours receive the summa cum laude Murray Award. The text of the award reads, "in grateful acknowledgment of your response to the call of public need as exemplified by Archibald R. Murray, Class of 1960, whose career embodies the highest standards of public service." As of Fall 2017, the Fordham University School of Law Archibald R. Murray Professorship was held by Tanya K. Hernández.

In 2007, The Legal Aid Society announced the creation of the Archibald R. Murray Memorial Fund for Law Student Loan Forgiveness "to honor the memory of Arch Murray and celebrate his many accomplishments that helped to provide quality legal services for low-income New Yorkers."

== Notable letters, memoranda and statements ==
In April 1974, while serving as Commissioner at the Division of Criminal Justice Services, Murray authored a memorandum addressed to the Office of Governor Malcolm Wilson opposing the signing of a bill, Assembly Bill No. 8667-A, that made mere possession of "chuka sticks" or nunchaku a crime even without any criminal intent by the possessor. Murray noted in the memo that nunchaku are used in karate and other martial arts training and that, "in view of the current interest and participation in these activities by many members of the public, it appears unreasonable--and perhaps even unconstitutional--to prohibit those who have a legitimate reason for possessing chuka sticks from doing so." On December 14, 2018, Murray's vision was given real-world application: the United States District Court for the Eastern District of New York struck down New York's nunchaku prohibitions as unconstitutional.

In December 1974, after it was announced that Murray had been chosen to run The Legal Aid Society, and the president of the union that represented most of its staff lawyers had expressed reservations about Murray's suitability because in his prior office he had strongly supported the Rockefeller drug laws and mandatory sentencing, Murray was directly quoted in the New York Times as having responded: "As a lawyer, I see nothing difficult in arguing a case in which you are on one side today and the other side tomorrow."

In September 1982, in an article in New York magazine about the challenges then being faced by The Legal Aid Society, Murray was directly quoted as saying: "As soon as people became afraid of crime, they began to lose their sense of balance [and] began to forget that defendants have rights, too."

In October 1994, in the wake of Mayor Rudy Giuliani's decision to terminate New York City's contract with The Legal Aid Society, Murray sent a letter to the city's Corporation Counsel, Paul A. Crotty, arguing that Giuliani had no legal basis for terminating the contract. In the letter, Murray pointed out that, during a brief strike by Legal Aid Society staff lawyers earlier that month, Legal Aid Society supervisors had handled civil and criminal cases so that "no chaos or gridlock resulted in the courts."
