= Rudolph Lexow =

German-American writer and editor

Rudolph Lexow (January 10, 1823 Tönning, Duchy of Schleswig, Denmark – July 16, 1909 New York City) was an American writer and editor.

== Biography ==
Lexow graduated from the University of Kiel and was active in the Revolutions of 1848 in Germany. He fled to England, where he married Caroline King in Hull, and then traveled on to the United States, where he settled in New York City and founded the Belletristisches Journal in 1852.

== Family ==
Rudolph and Caroline Lexow were the parents of New York City attorney Charles King Lexow, New York state senator Clarence Lexow, Allan Lexow and Rudolph G. Lexow. Their granddaughter Caroline Lexow Babcock was a prominent suffragist and pacifist.

== Works ==
He wrote histories of the American Civil War and of the Revolutions of 1848 in Germany.
