= Charles K. Lexow =

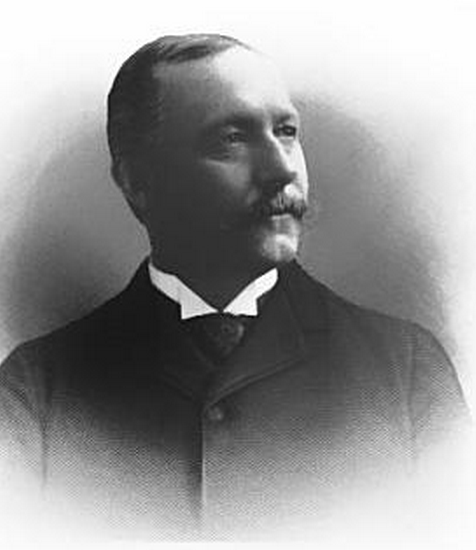
- Lexow in 1898

1st President of the Legal Aid Society
- In office 1889–1916
- Succeeded by: Arthur von Briesen

Personal details
- Born: January 21, 1849
- Died: July 14, 1928 (aged 79)

Charles K. Lexow (January 21, 1849 – July 14, 1928) was the Commissioner of Supreme Court Records and the oldest Republican District Leader in New York City in 1928 when he died.

== Biography ==
He was born on January 21, 1849, to Rudolph Lexow. He had a brother, Clarence Lexow. He graduated from Columbia Law School, then was the first attorney for the Legal Aid Society in New York City. He handled 212 cases in his first year in the office, collecting a total of $1,000 for his clients. He died on July 14, 1928.
