= Janet Mae Johnson =

American mountaineer (1936–1973)

- Johnson in 1973
- Born: November 20, 1936; Minneapolis, Minnesota
- Died: February 1, 1973 (aged 36); Mount Aconcagua, Argentina
- Occupations: mountaineer; educator

Janet Mae Johnson (1936–1973) was an American mountaineer and a teacher. She was known for making many climbs throughout the world. She died during an expedition on Mount Aconcagua in Argentina in 1973.

== Life ==
Johnson was born on November 20, 1936, and was adopted in Minneapolis by Mae and Victor Johnson. Her adoptive mother was a bookkeeper and her father ran a paper supply company. She never knew who her birth mother was.

Johnson was educated at the University of North Dakota and the University of Northern Colorado in Greeley. She went on to attend the University of Colorado, earning a Ph.D. in 1971 in education. She taught in the Denver public schools, and was a school librarian.

Johnson was known as a dedicated mountaineer. She was a member of the American Alpine Club and the Colorado Mountain Club. By the age of 30, Johnson became one of the first 20 women to climb to the summits of Colorado's "fourteeners" – over 50 mountains in Colorado that exceed 14,000 feet. Her expeditions and photographs were often featured in Trail and Timberline magazine. Other expeditions include Iztaccíhuatl, Kilimanjaro, Mount Fuji, Mount Blanc, the Matterhorn, among many other climbs.

== Death ==
Johnson died in 1973 under mysterious circumstances during an expedition of the Aconcagua mountain on the Polish Route. She was considered one of the strongest climbers of the team. Another member of the climbing party, John Cooper, a NASA engineer, also died during the expedition. Autopsies for both concluded that they had died of brain injuries, and several people including examiners at the autopsy believe that both Cooper and Johnson were murdered. The American Alpine Club stated in 1974 that she perished from exposure and exhaustion close to the summit. Johnson was buried in a cemetery for mountaineers at the trail head of Aconcagua mountain.

In 2020 her backpack and a 35mm camera loaded with film was found in the melting glacier; it was labeled with her name and Denver, Colorado address. The film in the camera as well as inside two metal film canisters in her pack was developed and the photographs published in The New York Times.
