= 1973 Mazamas Aconcagua expedition =

1973 mountaineering expedition in Argentina

The 1973 Mazamas Aconcagua expedition was an unsuccessful mountaineering expedition by eight Americans, most of whom were members of the Mazamas climbing club, to reach the summit of the Aconcagua mountain in Argentina. Two of the mountaineers, Janet Mae Johnson and John Cooper, disappeared and were later found dead under mysterious circumstances.

== Participants ==
The expedition was organized by lawyer Carmie Defoe, a member of the Mazamas climbing club in Oregon, and most participants were also club members. The participants were:

- Carmie Dafoe, 52, lawyer
- Jim Petroske, 39, psychiatrist
- Bill Eubank, 45, physician
- Arnold McMillen, 46, dairy farmer
- Bill Zeller, 45, police officer
- John Shelton, 25, college student
- John Cooper, 35, NASA engineer
- Janet Mae Johnson, 36, teacher and librarian

Mountain guide Miguel Alfonso, 38, accompanied the group. The base camp manager was Robert Bustos, 25.

== Expedition ==
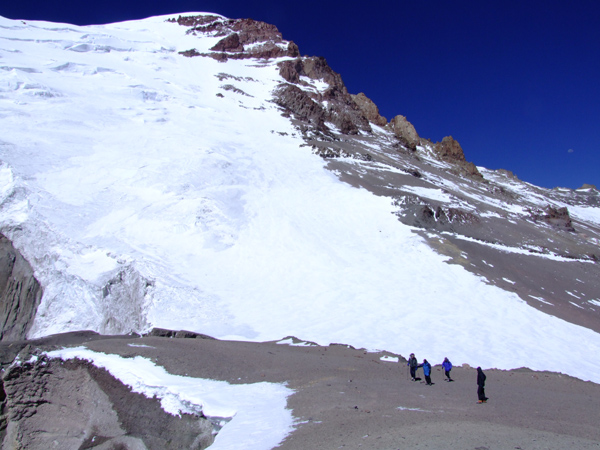
The Polish Glacier

The expedition took the Polish Route (via the Polish Glacier) up the mountain. According to group leader Dafoe, the expedition attempted to become the fifth to top the summit of Aconcagua via the Polish Route.

The group departed from Portland, Oregon on January 19, 1973. They arrived at Punta de Vacas and two days later arrived at a base camp located at 14,000 feet. Six days later two members of the party turned back, while another quit climbing but stayed on the mountain. The following day the party made it to a higher camp at 20,000 feet. Several of the remaining climbers fell ill or became disoriented or irrational. Guide Miguel Alfonso escorted Petroske back down due to him suffering from high-altitude cerebral edema, with Zeller, McMillan, Cooper and Johnson remaining.

A 2023 The New York Times article reported that at 21,000 feet the party headed for the summit after leaving most of their gear and possessions at the 20,000 foot campsite. Accounts by Zeller and McMillan claimed the four climbers spent that night on the glacier where they dug a snow cave in which to sleep, however they did not bring their sleeping bags. The following morning, Cooper abandoned the climb and descended downhill alone while Johnson and two others continued towards the summit. Later that day Johnson separated from the other two. After finding her the three roped themselves together and camped another night. The following day the three descended to the camp at 20,000 feet. The next morning Johnson could not be found.

== Aftermath ==
After returning to the United States, Dafoe organized a secret meeting of Mazamas leadership and expedition survivors, and a chronology of events was published. Dafoe's formal expedition report published in the Mazamas annual in 1973, concluded that Johnson and Cooper "probably died of pulmonary edema" and had been desperate to reach the summit.

In late 1973, a team led by Alfonso found Cooper's frozen body stretched out on the mountainside. His face had a frightened expression, and his abdomen had a deep cylindrical injury. An autopsy concluded that he had died of "injuries to the skull and brain".

Two years later, on February 9, 1975, Johnson's body was found; her broken eyeglasses and a film container were found in her jacket pocket. The experienced Argentine mountaineers who found her body were "disturbed by the circumstances in which they found the body" and concerned of the possibility of foul play. There were three wounds on her head and face. Although she was an experienced mountaineer, she was wearing clothing that was not suitable for the weather conditions. Her body was removed from the mountain in 1976, three years after her death. Another account in the Pittsburgh Press states that she was "left to die in the mountains because she couldn't keep up with the team." An autopsy determined her cause of death as a brain injury.

There have been speculations that foul play may have occurred in the deaths of Cooper and Johnson. In 2020 Johnson's backpack and a 35mm camera loaded with film was found in the melting glacier. It was labeled with Johnson's name and Denver, Colorado address. The film in the camera as well and two metal film canisters in her pack were developed and the photographs published in The New York Times.
