= Women's Peace Society =

The Women's Peace Society was an organized movement that focused on demilitarization in the United States and iniquity of violence. The Women's Peace Society was an active organization for fourteen years, being founded in 1919 and evolving into a separate peace movement-Women's Peace Union of the Western Hemisphere- in 1933. The Women's Peace Society was created on September 12, 1919, in the United States when a group of women that included Fanny Garrison Villard, Elinor Byrns, Katherine Devereaux Blake, and Caroline Lexow Babcock resigned from the executive committee of the Women's International League for Peace and Freedom because they found "a fundamental lack of unity in the membership as a whole and in the executive committee". The leader of the group, Fanny Garrison Villard sought to bring importance to humanitarian issues and raise awareness for the importance of all lives after the deadly consequences of World War I.

== Background ==
The Women's Peace Society's main concern was abolishing all wars and future war efforts. The Women's Peace Society fought alongside other peace organizations such as the Women's Peace Union and the Fellowship of Reconciliation to raise awareness about the atrocities of war and the millions of deaths that could have been avoided if the United States withdrew from foreign affairs. The women that participated in these peace groups often spoke out to the public about these issues and through city council meetings and congressional hearings towards an antiwar amendment. Alongside other peace organization groups, the Women's Peace Society helped create the War Resisters League in 1923 which continues to be an organization moving towards the abolishment of war after World War I and now against the ongoing wars in Afghanistan and Iraq.

=== The Founder: Helen Frances "Fanny" Garrison Villard ===
Fanny Garrison Villard was known for her work as a Suffragist, activist for Anti-war movement, and avid Humanitarian. Helen Frances "Fanny" Garrison Villard was born December 16, 1844, in Massachusetts to William Lloyd Garrison and Helen Eliza (Benson) Garrison. Fanny Garrison Villard married Henry Villard, a publisher for a newspaper, in January 1866. Henry and Fanny Villard had four children together: Henry Hillgard Villard; Oswald Garrison Villard; Helen Villard; and Harold Garrison Villard. Fanny died in July 1928 in New York.

Helen Frances "Fanny" Garrison Villard was most notable for founding the Women's Peace Society (1919), cofounding the National Association for the Advancement of Colored People (1909), and founding the Woman's Peace Party(1915). She was also well-known for being one of the members in founding Barnard and Radcliffe Colleges. Fanny's father, William Lloyd Garrison, was most notable for his Abolitionism work against slavery in the United States in during the mid to late nineteenth century. Fanny grew up during the climax of her father's anti-slavery campaign. Being a child of a famous abolitionist and American journalist would influence her in her adult years to use her voice and become an influential activist against many social issues such as inequalities that African American's faced in the United States. Due to Henry Villard's success with his business, the Edison General Electric, Fanny was able to pursue her dream of being an activist and pursue her interest in Philanthropy. Fanny Garrison Villard was an active member of the Women's suffrage movement in 1906 and had begun to speak at debates and legislative hearings. This led to her involvement in the Peace movement in 1915 during World War I, joining the Women's Peace Party under founder Jane Addams. Fanny made it her first priority to focus on the peace movement in the United States during and after World War I and in 1919 she founded the Women's Peace Society, an organization focused on total disarmament in foreign affairs.

==== Historical significance ====
The Women's Peace Society was one among the very few first antiwar and Pacifism organizations in the United States in the early twentieth century. Antiwar organizations such as the Women's Peace Society and the Women's Peace Party were the first Feminism organizations who brought forth their concerns of the European conflict and economic causes of war. The growing involvement of women's participation in activism for peace and women's suffrage fueled both the Women's Peace Society and Women's Peace Party organizations. Both men and women united in antiwar movements across the United States after its involvement in World War I. All American citizens were expected to embrace in the patriotic call to arms, but the small minority of pacifists and citizens involved in Civil libertarianism opposed Militarism in the United States in foreign countries. American men and women in the early twentieth century were some of the first small group of citizens to speak out against militarism and were often threatened their own civil liberties and freedoms by participating in such movements against the patriotic association to war in America.

In the future, more and more American citizens would join such antiwar and peace movements; however the organization of the antiwar movement in 1914 was solely influenced by upper class businessmen and politicians. The emergence of World War II and the Vietnam war brought forth American citizens from the working class and lower class citizens. Increasing anger over wartime drafts, policies, and economic conditions led to a more Anarchism view and transformed many American citizens views of war involvement.

==== Modern Day Peace and Antiwar Movements ====
The first antiwar movements and organizations in the early twentieth century fueled American's interest in future peace and antiwar movements. After World War I and World War II ended, the United States had accumulated over half a million military fatalities. After WWI and WWII, holidays such as Armistice Day and Veterans Day in the United States was made to honor peace and the many US citizens who had died in war. Holidays to commemorate peace and fallen US military members quickly transformed into honoring the military, glorifying war, and displaying militarism.

The most recent antiwar movements and oppositions are against the ongoing war in Afghanistan and several other countries in the Middle East. The United States military is currently active in Afghanistan, Syria, Saudi Arabia, Iraq, Yemen, Somalia, Libya, and Niger. Many antiwar and pro-peace organizations in the United States have emerged since the beginning of the United States involvement in foreign affairs, such as the Middle East. Organizations such as Women Against War, Women's International League for Peace and Freedom, United States Institute of Peace, and many more call for Disarmament and end to United States involvement in Afghanistan and other foreign nations.

== Members ==
- Jessie Belle Hardy Stubbs MacKaye was president of the Milwaukee branch. She took her own life in 1921.
- Fanny Garrison Villard (1844–1928) was a women's suffrage campaigner and a co-founder of National Association for the Advancement of Colored People. She was the daughter of prominent publisher and abolitionist William Lloyd Garrison. Her husband was the publisher and railroad tycoon Henry Villard. Her son, Oswald Villard, was a prominent pacifist and civil rights activist.

== See also ==
- List of anti-war organizations
