= Women's Peace Union =

Women's Peace Union (WPU) was a radical pacifist organization founded in 1921 as a joint effort of women from the United States and Canada with the goal of outlawing war. Its single purpose was to push through a Constitutional Amendment to prohibit war.

== History ==
Christine Ross Barker a Nova Scotian suffragist and Women's International League for Peace and Freedom (WILPF) member, proposed a conference to be held in 1921 with American and Canadian women to discuss outlawing war. The conference, held between August 19 and 21, at Niagara, Ontario spurred the creation of the Women's Peace Union of the Western Hemisphere. The organization called for the immediate disarmament of all nations, and encouraged cooperation of women in Canada, Mexico and the United States to work towards that goal. Barker was the temporary chair, Margaret Long Thomas of New York City was appointed secretary, and Gertrude Franchot Tone of Niagara Falls, New York was the treasurer. Though founded by Canadian women, the organization was based in New York and strove to introduce an Amendment to the Constitution of the United States banning participation in war—the solitary mission of the organization. Caroline Lexow Babcock and Elinor Byrns coordinated the efforts to draft the amendment and to work within the United States political system to outlaw war. WPU campaigned steadily and single-mindedly from 1923 to 1939, along with Senator Lynn Joseph Frazier of North Dakota, for a constitutional amendment that would outlaw war and the preparation for war in the United States and all its territories. WPU refused to negotiate when it came to partial disarmament methods as they completely condemned all acts of violence. From 1926, Rose Henderson, a Canadian social reformer, had become a supporter of the WPU.

Although the group's ideas and strives were extreme, they were still very reflective of the attitudes of masses during that time period. A great accomplishment for the group came in the form of the Kellogg-Briand Pact of 1928 in which sixty-two nations agreed to renounce war as a way to advance national designs and as a solution to international squabbles. They were able to make their advances through their philosophy of non-violence and their push for suffrage. Their nonviolent tactics included lobbying, letter-writing campaigns and public meetings. They also adopted the principle of praising women and criticizing men. Their feminist philosophy led them to adopt the idea that it would be women who would save the United States and end all wars. Their destruction came from a narrow focus, which was mostly centered on passing the amendment against war. And they were not particularly welcoming of peace organizations that included men or encompassed popular thoughts of men which caused the WPU to be extremely isolated. By 1940, WPU was almost completely non-operable and not functioning as it was no longer in effect, but it actually started to dismantle in the mid to late 1930s.

== See also ==
- Equity feminism
- Feminist art movement
- Feminist art movement in the United States
- Feminist Majority Foundation
- Feminists For Life
- Independent Women's Forum
- Individualist feminism
- Jewish feminism
- List of anti-war organizations
- NARAL Pro-Choice America
- National Organization for Women
- New Thought
- Planned Parenthood
- Radical Women
- Woman's Peace Party

== Notes and references ==
=== Bibliography ===
- Campbell, Peter (2010). Rose Henderson: A Woman for the People. McGill-Queen's Press. ISBN 978-0-7735-8116-6.
- Swerdlow, Amy (1993). Women Strike for Peace: Traditional Motherhood and Radical Politics in the 1960s. University of Chicago Press. ISBN 978-0-226-78636-0.
- Alonso, Harriet Hyman (1997). The Women's Peace Union and the Outlawry of War, 1921-1942. Syracuse University Press. ISBN 978-0-8156-0417-4.
