= Clarence Lexow =

American politician

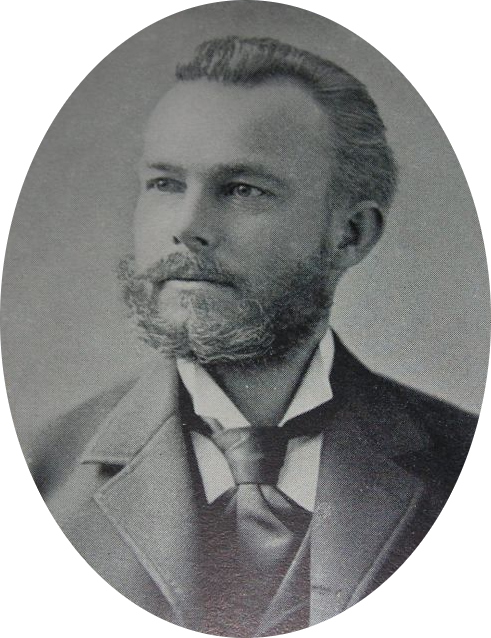
Lexow c. 1899

Clarence Lexow (September 16, 1852 – December 31, 1910) was an American politician and member of the New York Senate from 1894 to 1898. He is best known for chairing the eponymous Lexow Committee, which investigated police corruption in New York City.

== Biography ==
Lexow was born on September 16, 1852, in Brooklyn, New York (state). His father was Rudolph Lexow (1823–1909), who was born in Germany. His mother was born in England and had died prior to 1880. His siblings include: Charles K. Lexow (1850–1928) who was a lawyer in 1880; Allen Lexow (1855–?) who was a banker in 1880; and Rudolf Grant Lexow (1865–?).

Lexow studied abroad and at the Columbia Law School, where he graduated in 1872. He was admitted to the bar and established his practice in New York City, where he had many German-American clients. In 1880 Clarence was living in Clarkstown, Rockland County, New York with his parents, and he was already a lawyer. Rudolph Lexow his father was working as an editor. Clarence and Charles also appear as living in Manhattan in the Benedict Building at 79 Washington Place in New York City.

In 1882, Lexow became a resident of Nyack and was active in the Republican Party there. In 1890, he was an unsuccessful nominee for Congress. Though Lexow was unsuccessful, the majority for the Democratic victor was lower than had been usual.

Lexow was a member of the New York State Senate from 1894 to 1898, sitting in the 117th, 118th (both 16th D.), 119th, 120th and 121st New York State Legislatures (all three 23rd D.). Here he at once took a leadership role, and was chairman of the committee on internal affairs and introduced the bi-partisan police bill calling for an investigation of the New York City Police. This led to the appointment, in 1894, of the Lexow Committee, of which he was the head. The committee documented how Tammany Hall leaders and the police extorted bribes from operators of gambling and prostitution houses. He was a Senator from the 16th District from 1894 to 1895 and the 23rd District from 1896 to 1898. Lexow was also the introducer of the bill creating the city of Greater New York, was chairman of the joint legislative committee for the investigation of trusts and unlawful combinations, of the committee on primary elections reform, and of the judiciary committee.

In 1896, Lexow was chairman of the committee on resolutions at the Republican State convention and introduced the gold standard plank in the platform; in 1900, he was a presidential elector, voting for William McKinley and Theodore Roosevelt.

Lexow died in 1910 and was buried in Oak Hill Cemetery, Nyack, New York. His daughter Caroline Lexow Babcock was a prominent suffragist and pacifist.

== Works ==
Lexow is the author of reports on:

- Municipal Government (5 vols., 1895)
- Trusts and Unlawful Combinations (1895)

New York State Senate
Preceded by John H. Derby	New York State Senate; 16th District; 1894–1895	Succeeded by Louis Munzinger
Preceded by Henry J. Coggeshall	New York State Senate; 23rd District; 1896–1898	Succeeded by Louis F. Goodsell
