= Fay Peak =

Mountain in Washington (state), United States

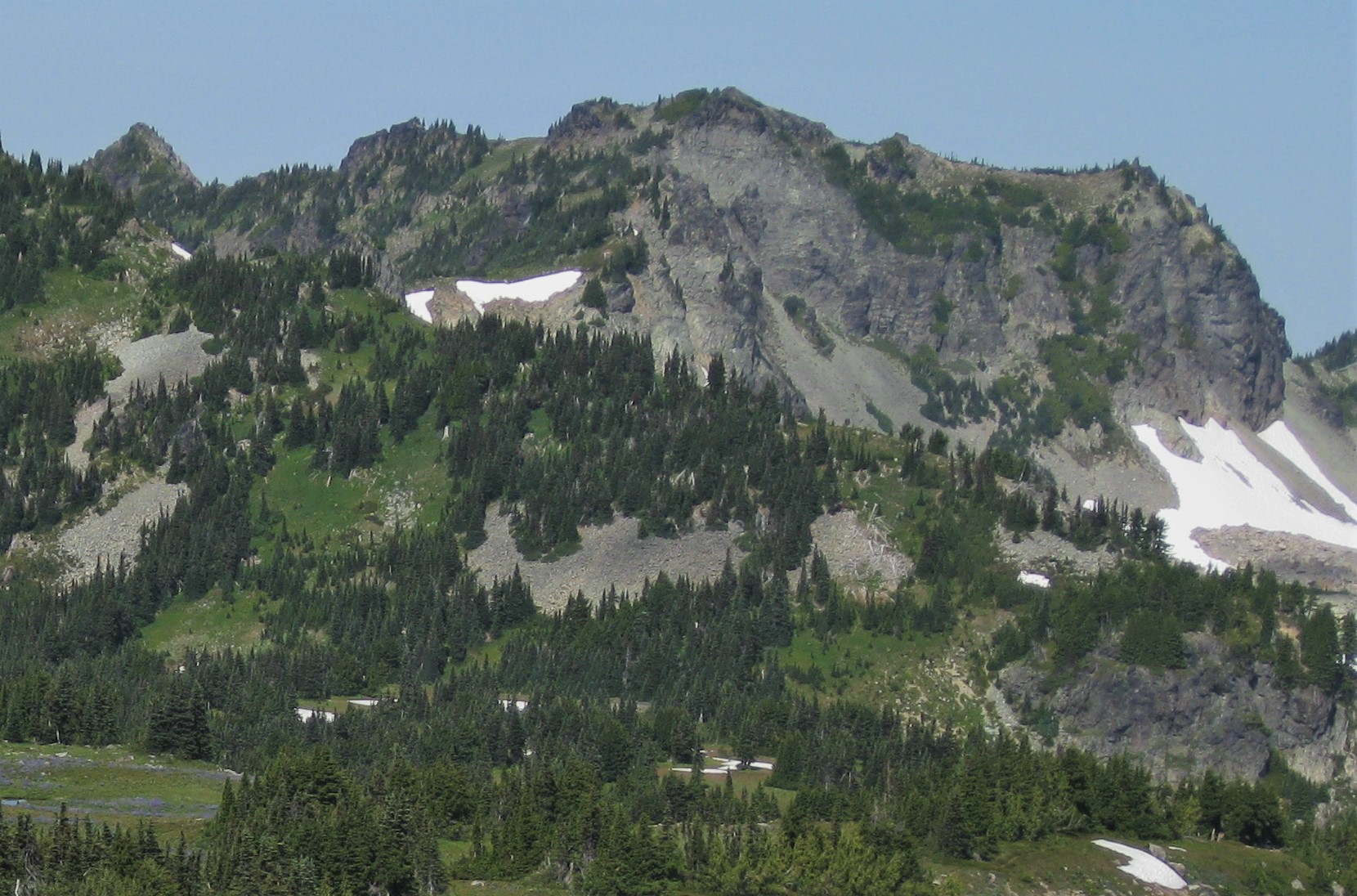
- Fay Peak upper left, East Fay Peak centered.

Highest point
- Elevation: 6,492 ft (1,979 m)
- Prominence: 520 ft (158 m)
- Parent peak: Old Desolate (7,137 ft)
- Isolation: 0.26 mi (0.42 km)
- Coordinates: 46°55′56″N 121°50′56″W

Geography
- Location within Washington (state) Location within the United States
- Country: United States
- State: Washington
- County: Pierce
- Protected area: Mount Rainier National Park
- Parent range: Cascades
- Topo map: USGS Mowich Lake

Climbing
- First ascent: August 15, 1884
- Easiest route: class 2 scrambling west ridge

Fay Peak is a double-summit mountain located in Mount Rainier National Park, in Pierce County of Washington state. It is part of the Cascade Range, and lies seven miles (11 km) northwest of the summit of Mount Rainier. The 6,492-foot elevation summit of Fay Peak lies a quarter-mile west of the highest point, East Fay Peak, 6,520+ ft (1,990+ m). Echo Rock is its nearest higher neighbor, 2.7 mi (4.3 km) to the southeast. Precipitation runoff from Fay Peak is drained by Cataract Creek on the east side of the mountain, and the west side drains into Mowich Lake and Mowich River.

== Climate ==
Fay Peak is located in the marine west coast climate zone of western North America. Most weather fronts originating in the Pacific Ocean travel northeast toward the Cascade Mountains. As fronts approach, they are forced upward by the peaks of the Cascade Range (orographic lift), causing them to drop their moisture in the form of rain or snow onto the Cascades. As a result, the west side of the Cascades experiences high precipitation, especially during the winter months in the form of snowfall. Because of maritime influence, snow tends to be wet and heavy, resulting in high avalanche danger. During winter months, weather is usually cloudy, but due to high pressure systems over the Pacific Ocean that intensify during summer months, there is often little or no cloud cover during the summer. The months of July through September offer the most favorable weather for viewing or climbing this peak.

== History ==
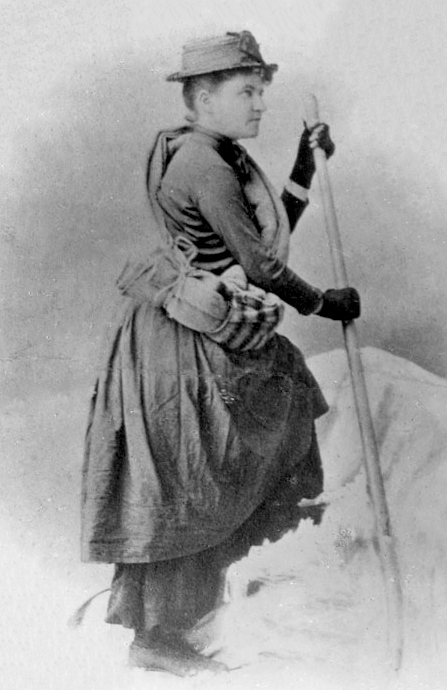
Fay Fuller circa 1890

This mountain's name honors Fay Fuller (1869–1958), the first woman to stand atop the summit of Mount Rainier. Her first successful ascent occurred on August 10, 1890, and her second on July 27, 1897. The name Fay Peak first appeared on a map of the mountain published in 1895. The toponym was officially adopted in 1913 by the United States Board on Geographic Names.

The first ascent of this peak was made August 15, 1884, by J. Warner Fobes, George James, and R. O. Wells.

== See also ==
- Geology of the Pacific Northwest

== Gallery ==
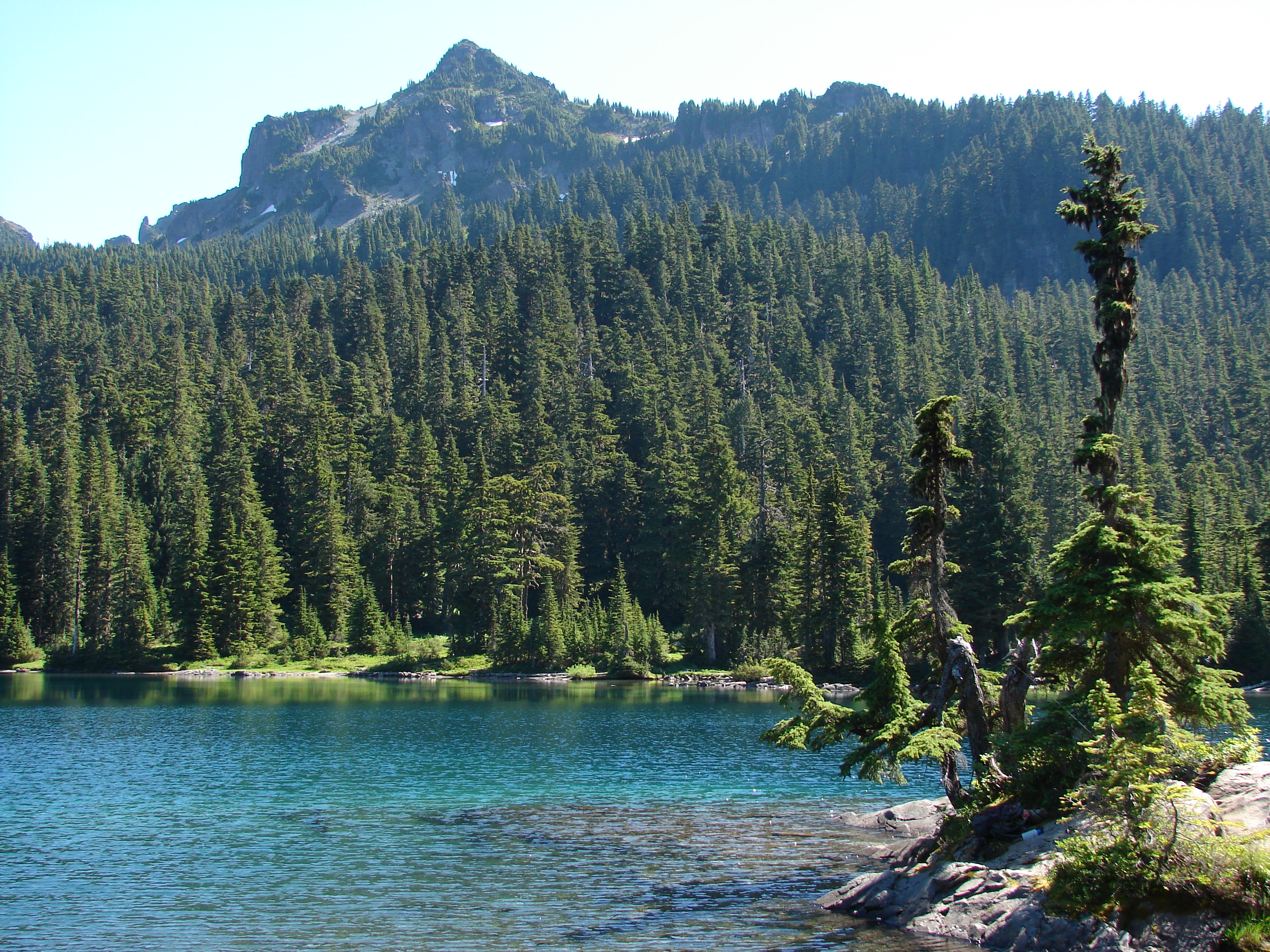
Fay Peak from Mowich Lake

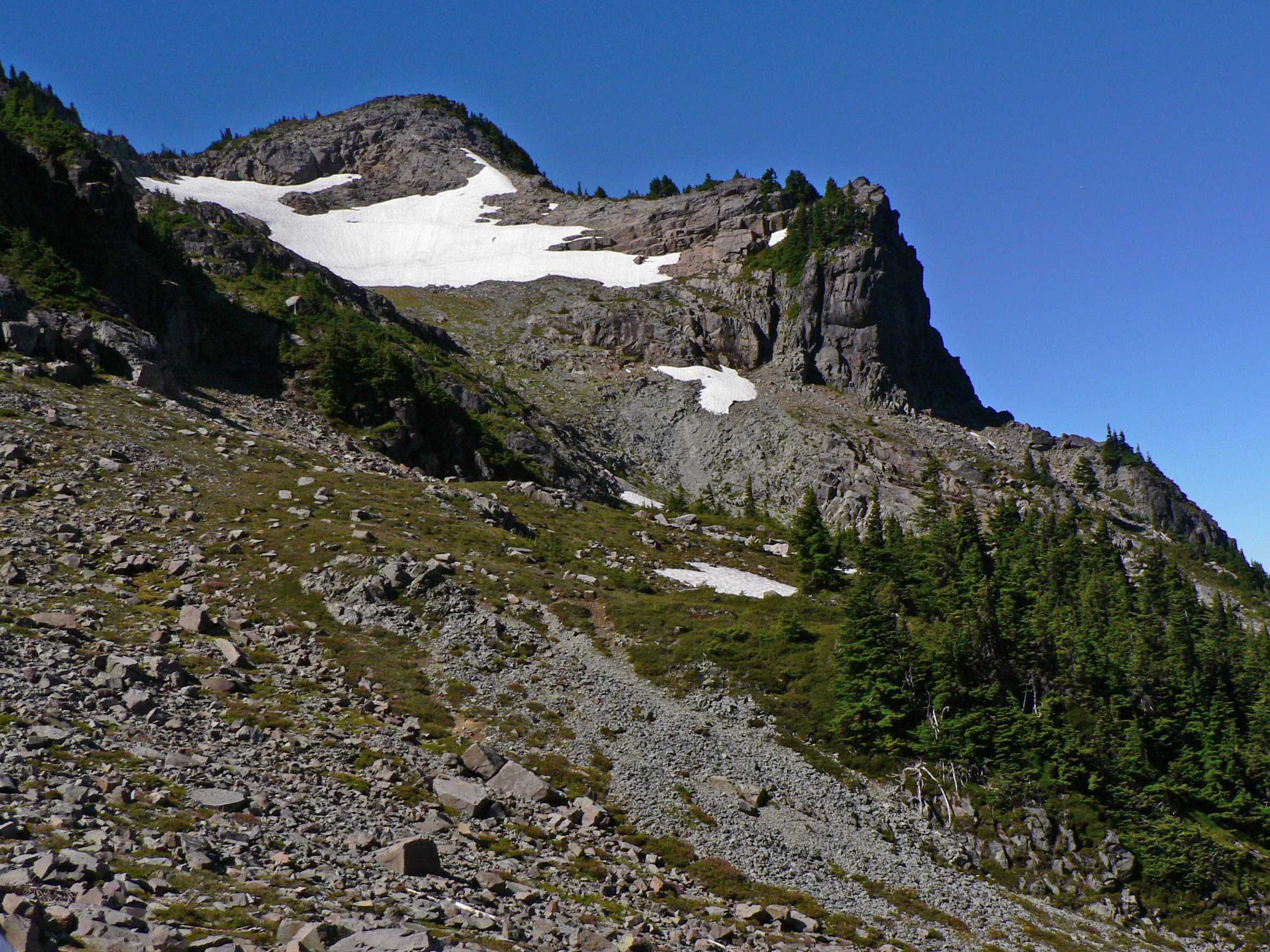
Fay Peak from Knapsack Pass
