= The Legal Aid Society =

Legal aid provider in New York City

- Founded: 1876
- Type: Non-profit
- Location: New York City
- Services: Legal representation, class action litigation
- Fields: Legal aid
- Key people: Charles K. Lexow, Steven Banks, Twyla Carter
- Website: legalaidnyc.org

The Legal Aid Society is a 501(c)(3) non-profit law firm based in New York City. Founded on March 8, 1876, it is the oldest and largest provider of legal aid in the United States. With over 2,500 employees, including 1,200+ attorneys and 1,200+ support staff, it is the city's largest law firm. Its attorneys provide representation in both criminal and civil matters, including individual cases and class action lawsuits. The organization is funded through a combination of public grants and private donations. It is the largest recipient of funding among regional legal aid providers from the New York City government and is the city's primary legal services provider.

== History and leadership ==
The Legal Aid Society was founded in 1876 in New York to defend the individual rights of German immigrants who could not afford to hire a lawyer. A large donation from the Rockefeller Family in 1890 enabled the organization to expand its services and include individuals from all backgrounds. It was renamed the New York Legal Aid Society in 1890. Legal Aid is governed by a board of directors. On January 1, 2026, Lynn K. Neuner became chairman of the board.

=== Presidents ===
- Alan Levine, president 2019 to present
- Blaine V. (Fin) Fogg, president from 2009 to 2019.
- Alexander Forger, president from 1977 to 1979.
- Charles Evans Hughes, third president beginning 1916.
- Arthur von Briesen, second president from 1890 to 1916.

=== Attorneys-in-Chief ===
- Twyla Carter, beginning August 1, 2022. Carter is the first Black woman and first Asian American to lead the organization in its 150-year history.
- Janet Sabel, January 2, 2019, to June 1, 2022.
- Seymour W. James, Jr., July 1, 2014, to June 30, 2018.
- Steven Banks, 2004 to March 31, 2014.
- Daniel L. Greenberg, 1994 to 2004.
- Archibald R. Murray, 1975 to 1994.
- Cornelius Porter Kitchel, 1905 to 1906. He was the sixth attorney-in-chief.
- Charles K. Lexow, beginning 1876. He was the first attorney-in-chief.

== Services ==
The Legal Aid Society provides a range of civil legal services, as well as criminal defense work, and juvenile representation in Family Court. The organization's primary purpose is to provide free legal assistance to New Yorkers living at or below the poverty level who cannot afford to hire a lawyer when confronted with a legal problem. Annually, over two million New Yorkers benefit from Legal Aid's direct representation, impact litigation, and policy and legislative advocacy.

The Legal Aid Society is the city's primary public defender, along with New York County Defender Services in Manhattan, Brooklyn Defender Services in Brooklyn, Bronx Defenders in the Bronx, Queens Defenders in Queens, and the Neighborhood Defender Service in northern Manhattan. With over 40 units and practice areas, including immigration, public benefits, and education, among others, it is also the largest provider of legal assistance in New York City housing courts.

== See also ==
- Judiciary of New York
- Justice (1954 TV series)
- Law of New York
- Legal Aid Society of Cleveland
- Legal Aid Society of the District of Columbia
