= Moore v. City of East Cleveland =

- Supreme Court of the United States

Argued November 2, 1976 Decided May 31, 1977
- Full case name: Inez Moore, Appellant, v. City of East Cleveland, Ohio
- Citations: 431 U.S. 494 (more) 97 S. Ct. 1932; 52 L. Ed. 2d 531; 1977 U.S. LEXIS 17

Holding
- An East Cleveland, Ohio zoning ordinance that prohibited a grandmother from living with her grandchild was unconstitutional

Court membership
- Chief Justice Warren E. Burger Associate Justices William J. Brennan Jr. · Potter Stewart; Byron White · Thurgood Marshall; Harry Blackmun · Lewis F. Powell Jr. William Rehnquist · John P. Stevens

Case opinions
- Plurality: Powell, joined by Brennan, Marshall, Blackmun
- Concurrence: Brennan, joined by Marshall
- Concurrence: Stevens
- Dissent: Burger
- Dissent: Stewart, joined by Rehnquist
- Dissent: White

Laws applied
- U.S. Const. amend. XIV

Moore v. City of East Cleveland, 431 U.S. 494 (1977), was a United States Supreme Court case in which the Court ruled that an East Cleveland, Ohio zoning ordinance that prohibited Inez Moore, a black grandmother, from living with her grandchild was unconstitutional. Writing for a plurality of the Court, Associate Justice Lewis F. Powell Jr. ruled that the East Cleveland zoning ordinance violated substantive due process because it intruded too far upon the "sanctity of the family." Justice John Paul Stevens wrote an opinion concurring in the judgment in which he agreed that the ordinance was unconstitutional, but he based his conclusion upon the theory that the ordinance intruded too far upon Moore's ability to use her property "as she sees fit." Scholars have recognized Moore as one of several Supreme Court decisions that established "a constitutional right to family integrity."

== Background ==
=== Zoning Ordinance East Cleveland ===
In 1966, East Cleveland, Ohio implemented a zoning ordinance that restricted the residents living in a housing unit to "members of a single family." The regulation included complex definitions of "family," acknowledging only a few narrowly defined categories of individuals as a family unit. Specifically, the ordinance defined a "family" as "the household head, his or her spouse, the couple's childless unmarried children, at most only one child of the couple with dependent children, and one parent of either the head of the household or his or her spouse."

=== Initial lawsuit ===
In East Cleveland, Ohio, Inez Moore lived with her son, Dale Moore Sr., his son, Dale Moore Jr., as well as John Moore Jr., a grandson who was the child of one of Inez Moore's other children. In January 1973, Inez Moore was issued a citation from the City, which informed her that John Moore Jr. was an "illegal occupant" according to the violations of the city's zoning ordinance because he did not fit within the statute's definition of a "family" unit. When Inez Moore refused to remove John Moore Jr. from the home, the City filed criminal charges. Despite Moore's argument that the ordinance was facially and factually unconstitutional the court sentenced her to five days in jail and ordered her to pay a $25 fine. The Ohio Court of Appeals affirmed the decision of the trial court, and the Ohio Supreme Court denied review. In 1976, the Supreme Court of the United States granted certiorari to review the case. Moore was later then represented by Legal Aid Society of Cleveland.

== Opinion of the Court ==
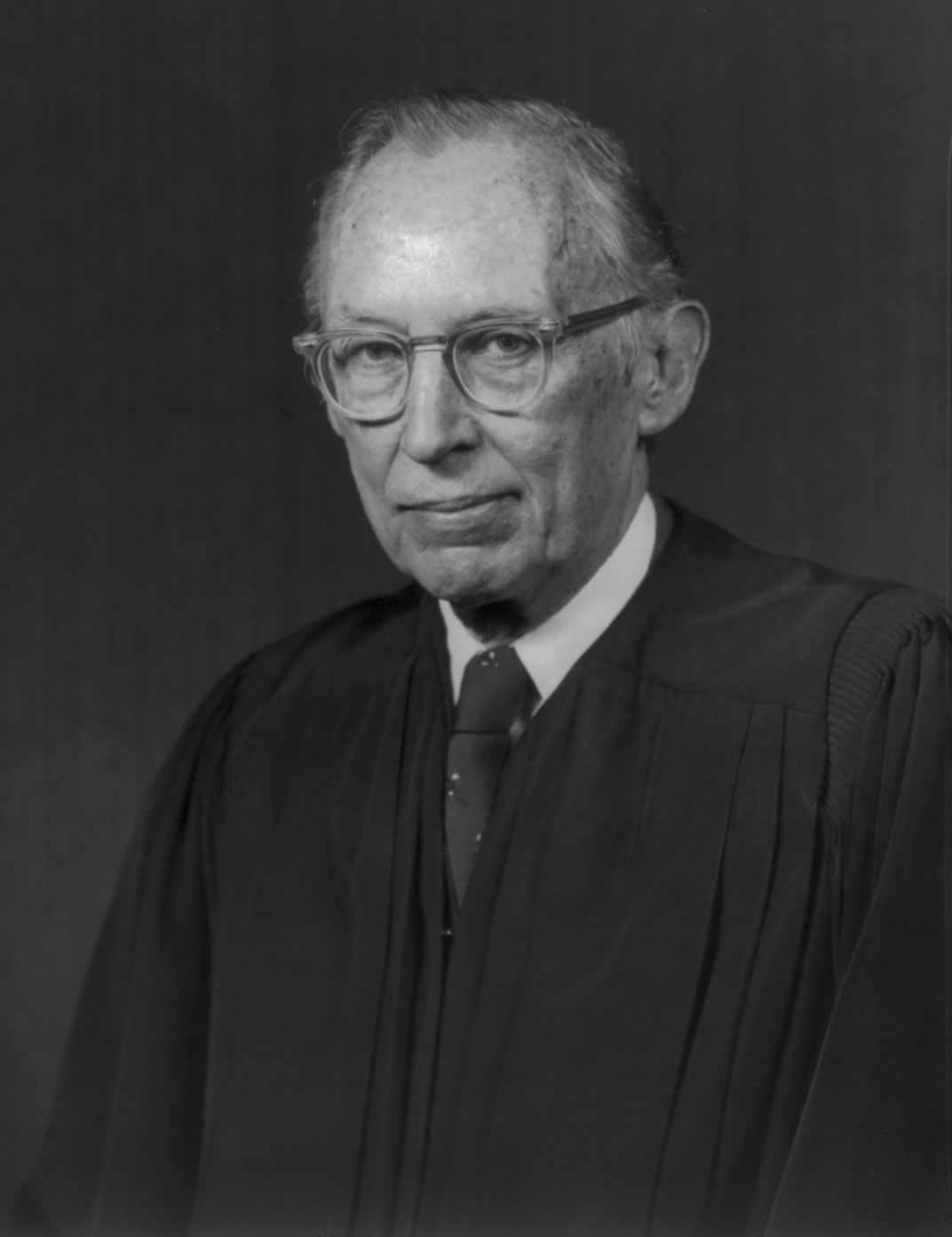
In his plurality opinion, Justice Lewis F. Powell Jr. argued that "the tradition of uncles, aunts, cousins, and especially grandparents sharing a household" deserved "constitutional recognition."

Writing for a plurality of the Court, Justice Lewis F. Powell Jr. ruled that the East Cleveland zoning ordinance violated substantive due process and was therefore unconstitutional. Justice Powell noted that this case was distinguishable from the Court's prior zoning law jurisprudence by virtue of the fact that earlier cases like Euclid v. Ambler Realty Co. and Village of Belle Terre v. Boraas did not restrict the ability of family members to live together. Because the East Cleveland ordinance "[chose] to regulate the occupancy of its housing by slicing deeply into the family itself" and imposed an "intrusive regulation on the family," neither Euclid nor Belle Terre were applicable in this case. Likewise, Justice Powell ruled that deference to the legislature was inappropriate.

Justice Powell cited a long line of cases in which the Supreme Court recognized that "freedom of personal choice in matters of marriage and family life is one of the liberties protected by the Due Process Clause of the Fourteenth Amendment." Additionally, Justice Powell ruled that the ordinance did not advance the City's goals of preventing overcrowding, minimizing traffic, and not overburdening the City's school system because the ordinance would have allowed for Moore to live with "a dozen school-age children" from one son while John Moore Jr. would be forced to live elsewhere. Although Justice Powell noted that that substantive due process "has at times been a treacherous field" for the Supreme Court, he ruled that the Court's precedent establishes "that the Constitution protects the sanctity of the family precisely because the institution of the family is deeply rooted in this Nation's history and tradition."

=== Concurring opinions ===
Justice William J. Brennan Jr. wrote a concurring opinion in which he emphasized that "the zoning power is not a license for local communities to enact senseless and arbitrary restrictions which cut deeply into private areas of protected family life." He stated that he wrote "only to underscore the cultural myopia of the arbitrary boundary drawn by the East Cleveland ordinance in the light of the tradition of the American home," which he argued "displays a depressing insensitivity toward the economic and emotional needs of a very large part of our society." Justice Brennan argued that the Constitution cannot be interpreted "to tolerate the imposition by government upon the rest of us of white suburbia's preference in patterns of family living."

Justice John Paul Stevens wrote an opinion concurring in the judgment, in which he argued that the "critical question presented by this case is whether East Cleveland's housing ordinance is a permissible restriction on appellant's right to use her own property as she sees fit". After reviewing the history of the Court's zoning jurisprudence, Justice Stevens concluded that "[t]here appears to be no precedent for an ordinance which excludes any of an owner's relatives from the group of persons who may occupy his residence on a permanent basis." Additionally, Justice Stevens concluded that the East Cleveland ordinance did not bear a substantial relationship "to the public health, safety, morals, or general welfare" of East Cleveland. Because the ordinance "cuts so deeply into a fundamental right normally associated with the ownership of residential property," Justice Stevens also concluded that the ordinance constituted a taking under the Fifth Amendment of the United States Constitution.

=== Dissenting opinions ===
Chief Justice Warren Burger wrote a dissenting opinion in which he argued that the constitutional question was foreclosed by the fact that Inez Moore did not exhaust "a plainly adequate administrative remedy." He wrote that Moore's lawyers "made no effort to apply to the Board for a variance to exempt her from the restrictions of the ordinance, even though her situation appears on its face to present precisely the kind of 'practical difficulties and unnecessary hardships' the variance procedure was intended to accommodate." Although Chief Justice Burger noted that the Supreme Court had not yet established that appellants must "utilize available state administrative remedies as a prerequisite to obtaining federal relief," he argued that "such a requirement is imperative if the critical overburdening of federal courts at all levels is to be alleviated." Consequently, Chief Justice Burger argued that the Court "should now make clear that the finite resources of this Court are not available unless the litigant has first pursued all adequate and available administrative remedies."

Justice Potter Stewart and Justice Byron White also filed dissenting opinions. Justice Stewart argued that the court's earlier decision in Belle Terre should determine the outcome in this case and that Moore's claims regarding associational freedom and privacy should not invoke constitutional protections. Justice White emphasized that the "substantive content of the [Due Process] Clause is suggested neither by its language nor by pre constitutional history" and concluded that "the interest in residing with more than one set of grandchildren" is not "one that calls for any kind of heightened protection under the Due Process Clause." Additionally, Justice White concluded that "the normal goals of zoning regulation are present here and that the ordinance serves these goals by limiting, in identifiable circumstances, the number of people who can occupy a single household."

== Analysis and commentary ==
Analysts have observed that Moore is one of several cases have established "a constitutional right to family integrity." Some commentators have also noted that the Moore decision lies at the intersection between the competing goals of controlling population density and maintaining family integrity, but in their rush to overturn "traditional-family ordinances," the Court may have "burn[ed] the house to roast the pig." Other commentators have observed that opinions like Moore have "a Trojan-Horse quality" because the Court's decision to recognize rights only for an extended biological family "is itself a potent form of state regulation of family life."

== See also ==
- List of United States Supreme Court cases, volume 431
- List of United States Supreme Court cases
- Lists of United States Supreme Court cases by volume
- List of United States Supreme Court cases by the Burger Court
