= Arthur von Briesen (lawyer) =

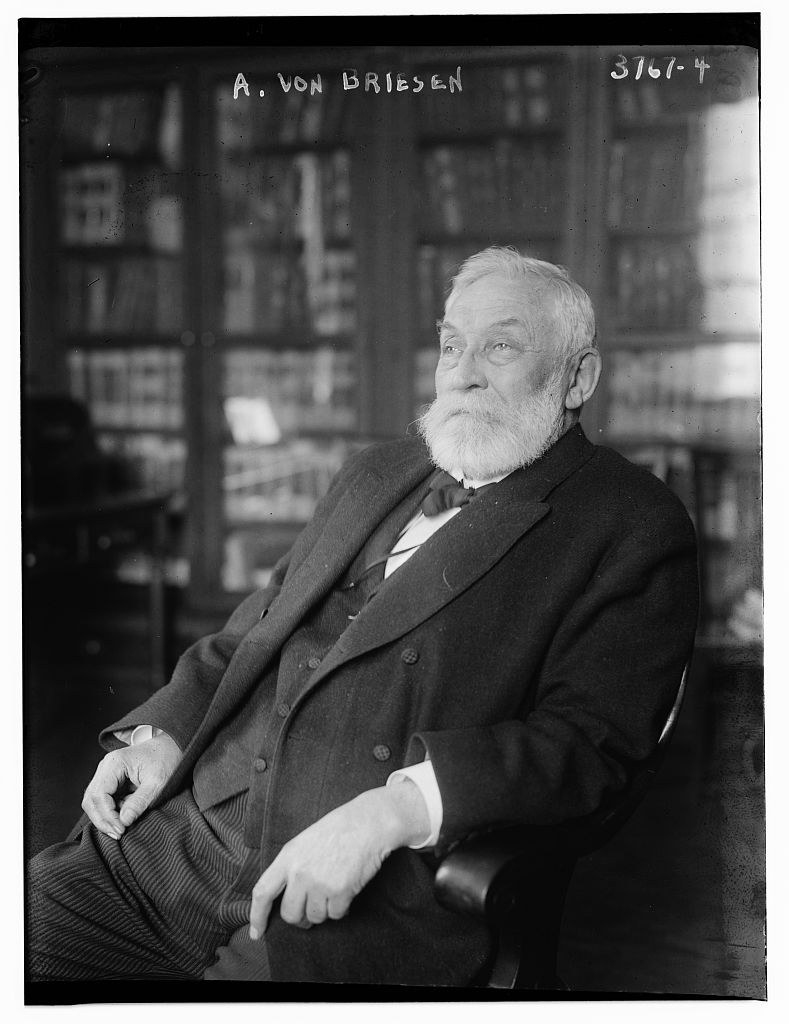
- von Briesen in 1915

2nd President of the Legal Aid Society
- In office 1889–1916
- Succeeded by: Charles Evans Hughes

Personal details
- Born: July 11, 1843 Borkendorf, Kingdom of Prussia
- Died: May 13, 1920 (aged 76) Staten Island Ferry Whitehall Terminal
- Cause of death: Heart disease
- Spouse: Anna Goepel (m. 1873)

Arthur von Briesen (July 11, 1843 – May 13, 1920) was a lawyer and philanthropist. He was president of the Legal Aid Society from 1889 to 1916.

== Biography ==
Briesen was born on July 11, 1843, in Borkendorf, Kingdom of Prussia and migrated to the United States in 1858, at the age of 15. In 1873 he married Anna Goepel.

Briesen then began to study law, he enlisted and served as sergeant of Company B of the First New York Volunteers during the American Civil War. After the war, he finished his legal studies at the New York University School of Law and was admitted to the bar for New York state in 1868.

He was president of the Legal Aid Society from 1890 to 1916. His support for Germany during World War I led to his resignation. He was replaced by Charles Evans Hughes.

Briesen died in Manhattan on May 13, 1920, at the Staten Island Ferry Whitehall Terminal while waiting for the ferry to arrive, to commute to his summer house at Fort Wadsworth on Staten Island.

Arthur and Anna von Briesen at home

== Legacy ==
His onetime summer estate adjoining Fort Wadsworth on Staten Island, New York City, is now Von Briesen Park, named for him. His papers are archived at Princeton University.
