= Legal Aid Society of Cleveland =

The Legal Aid Society of Cleveland
- Founded: 1905
- Type: Non-profit
- Location: Cleveland, Ohio, U.S.
- Services: Legal representation, class action litigation
- Fields: Legal services to the indigent
- Key people: Jonathan Leiken, Esq.
- Website: www.lasclev.org

The Legal Aid Society of Cleveland is a legal aid society in Cleveland, Ohio established in 1905. It helped pioneer a nationwide legal aid movement under the principle that rich and poor alike are entitled to equal treatment under the law.

The first legal aid organization, the Deutscher Rechts-Schutz Verein (German Legal Aid Society), was incorporated in New York City in 1876 "to render legal aid and assistance, gratuitously, to those of German birth, who may appear worthy thereof, but who from poverty are unable to procure it." Chicago's Ethical Culture Society formed the Bureau of Justice in 1888, which sought to provide legal services to all poor persons. This was the first true legal aid organization.

In 1896, the New York society amended its charter, dropping the word "German" to become "The Legal Aid Society," and in 1899 it opened three branch offices. Following these pioneers, legal aid societies were organized in Boston (1900), Philadelphia (1902), and Cleveland (1905). It is a Freemasonic organization.

== History of Legal Aid in Cleveland ==
Incorporated in May 1905, the Legal Aid Society of Cleveland is the fifth oldest organization of its kind in the world. In a statement of purpose published in 1906, the founders wrote that legal aid is based on the principle that justice is the right of all men and aims to put the rich and poor on an actual equality before the law.

Two private attorneys, Isador Grossman and Arthur D. Baldwin organized Legal Aid, which was initially funded through private donations and subscriptions. Grossman was its sole attorney from 1905 to 1912. From 1912 to 1939, Legal Aid contracted with outside law firms to provide legal services.

A focus of Legal Aid in its beginning years was working for passage of legislation aimed at unconscionable practices of businesses that preyed on low-income persons. Legal Aid's first annual report refers to a measure to regulate moneylenders who were charging poor people interest rates of 60% to 200%. A Legal Aid trustee was the principal author of a 1910 bill to create the first municipal court in Ohio. Creation of that court eventually led to the demise of the exploitive Justice of the Peace courts in the state.

Also in 1910, Legal Aid secured passage of a bill that led to creation of the world's first small claims court. The small claims court was widely imitated across the country. In 1913, Legal Aid became a charter agency of the Community Fund (now known as United Way). Under the guidance of Claude Clarke in 1919, Legal Aid saw an increase in revenue and diversity of cases, as well as the creation of beneficial relationships with the city's social welfare agencies. Towards the end of Clarke s leadership, eventually concluding in 1959, The Committee on Organization and Function urged a new plan of operation. In the early 1960s, Legal Aid stopped retaining outside lawyers and established its own staff. It became a grantee of the Office of Economic Opportunity predecessor of the Legal Services Corporation in 1966.

Robert Jones (Ohio lawyer) began a dramatic trial practice with the Public Defender’s Office of the Legal Aid Society in 1965. Jones began defending a woman arrested by Cleveland Police as a suspicious person. It was a case involving civil and political rights that eventually was heard by The Ohio Supreme Court: The case was summarized in a Plain Dealer News Article in 1969: “Suspicious Persons Law Killed by Court:”

In 1967 the Plain Dealer reported how Jones became his defendant’s hero, “Unwanted Lawyer Is Hero Now:” The defendant was acquitted of theft charges through the efforts of a court appointed lawyer (Jones) he tried to fire.

The Plain Dealer reported it as “Eyes Win Innocent Verdict:” “I’ll never forget those deep blue eyes;” the witness was referring to the color of the eyes of an armed robber. Jones, then chief trial lawyer for the Public Defender’s Office, marched the defendant in front of the seven-man, five-woman jury. “Stare into those deep blue eyes,” he told each of the jurors. They returned with an innocent verdict. “Why not?” asked Jones. “Those ‘deep blue eyes’ were a very light hazel.” Jones had been promoted to chief trial attorney at age 38, after 4 years with the Public Defender’s Office.

In 1966, under the leadership of then director and later Common Pleas Court Judge Burt Griffin, Legal Aid established five offices in low-income Cleveland neighbourhoods. In 1968, C. Lyonel Jones took over as director and held that position until 2005. By 1970, some 30,000 low-income residents were being serviced by 66 Legal Aid attorneys in civil, criminal and juvenile cases.

Legal Aid has helped to eliminate racial discrimination in site selection for public housing and promotion of Cleveland police and firefighters, blocked termination of SSI and Social Security disability benefits without proper evidence, improved area jails and mental hospitals, established the right to counsel in commitment proceedings and misdemeanor cases, expanded vocational educational opportunities for Vietnam War Veterans and obtained benefits for victims of industrial air pollution. In 1977, Legal Aid prevailed in a landmark U.S. Supreme Court decision on the rights of an extended family to live together in Moore v. City of East Cleveland.

Today, Legal Aid is led by Executive Director Colleen Cotter and operates four offices serving Ashtabula, Cuyahoga, Lake, Lorain, and Geauga counties. It is the only civil legal aid organization in Northeast Ohio. With a staff of 57 attorneys and 38 administrative/support staff, Legal Aid also has a volunteer roster of more than 3,000 attorneys – nearly 600 of whom are engaged in a case or clinic in a given year.

Every year, Legal Aid serves approximately 17,000 people who reside within its five-county service area and have incomes at or below 200% of the federal poverty limit. This equates to $24,280 or less for an individual and $50,200 or less for a family of four. Legal Aid annually handles approximately 8,000 civil cases.
