= List of New York (state) suffragists =

This is a list of New York suffragists, suffrage groups and others associated with the cause of women's suffrage in New York state.

== Groups ==
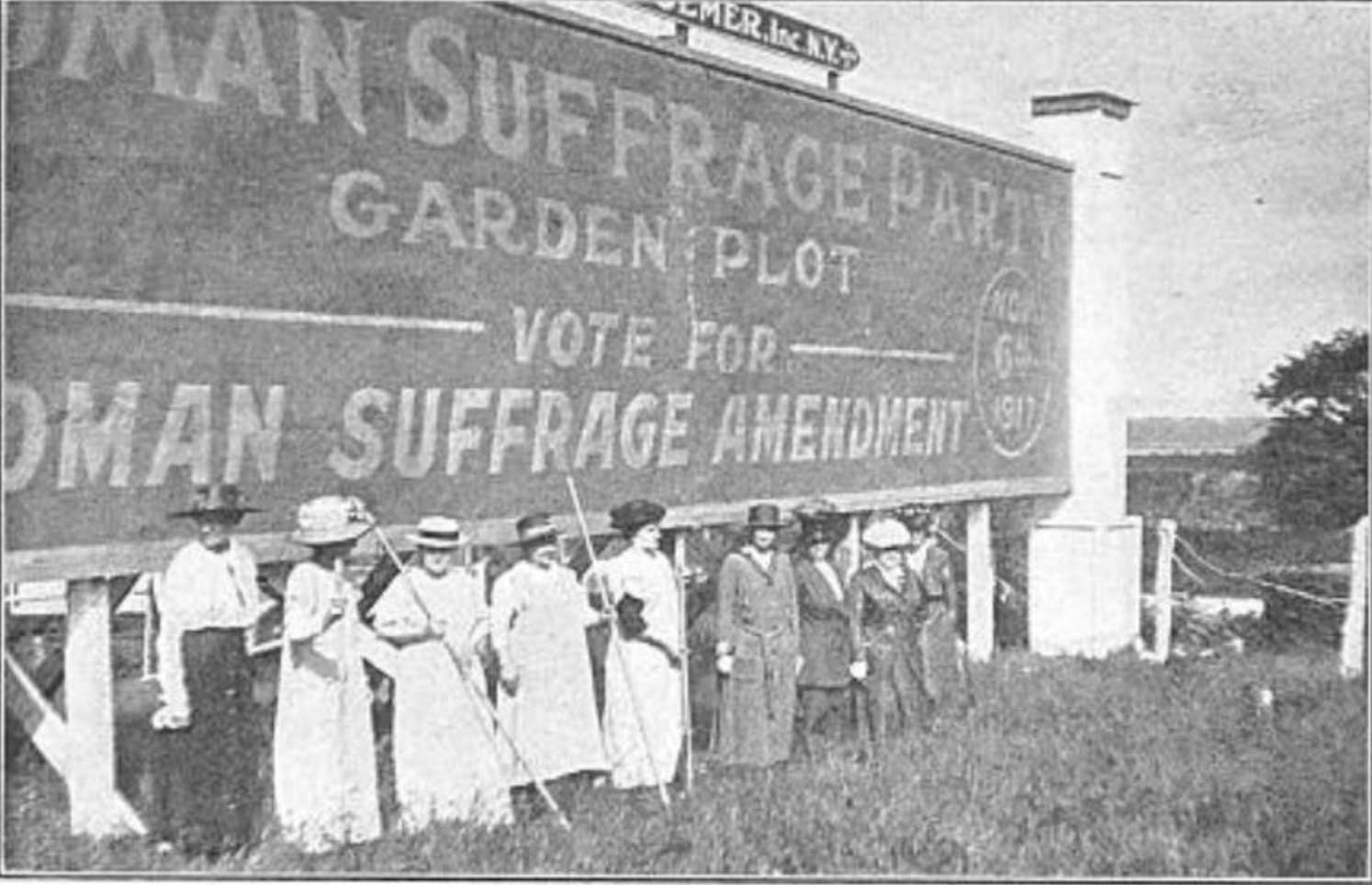
Model war garden of Bronx suffragists (1917)

- American Equal Rights Association.
- Equality League of Self Supporting Women.
- Leslie Woman Suffrage Commission.
- The Men's League.
- New York Equal Suffrage League.
- New York State Suffrage Association.
- Poughkeepsie Woman Suffrage Party.
- Woman Suffrage Party (branch of the National American Woman Suffrage Association).

== Suffragists ==
A

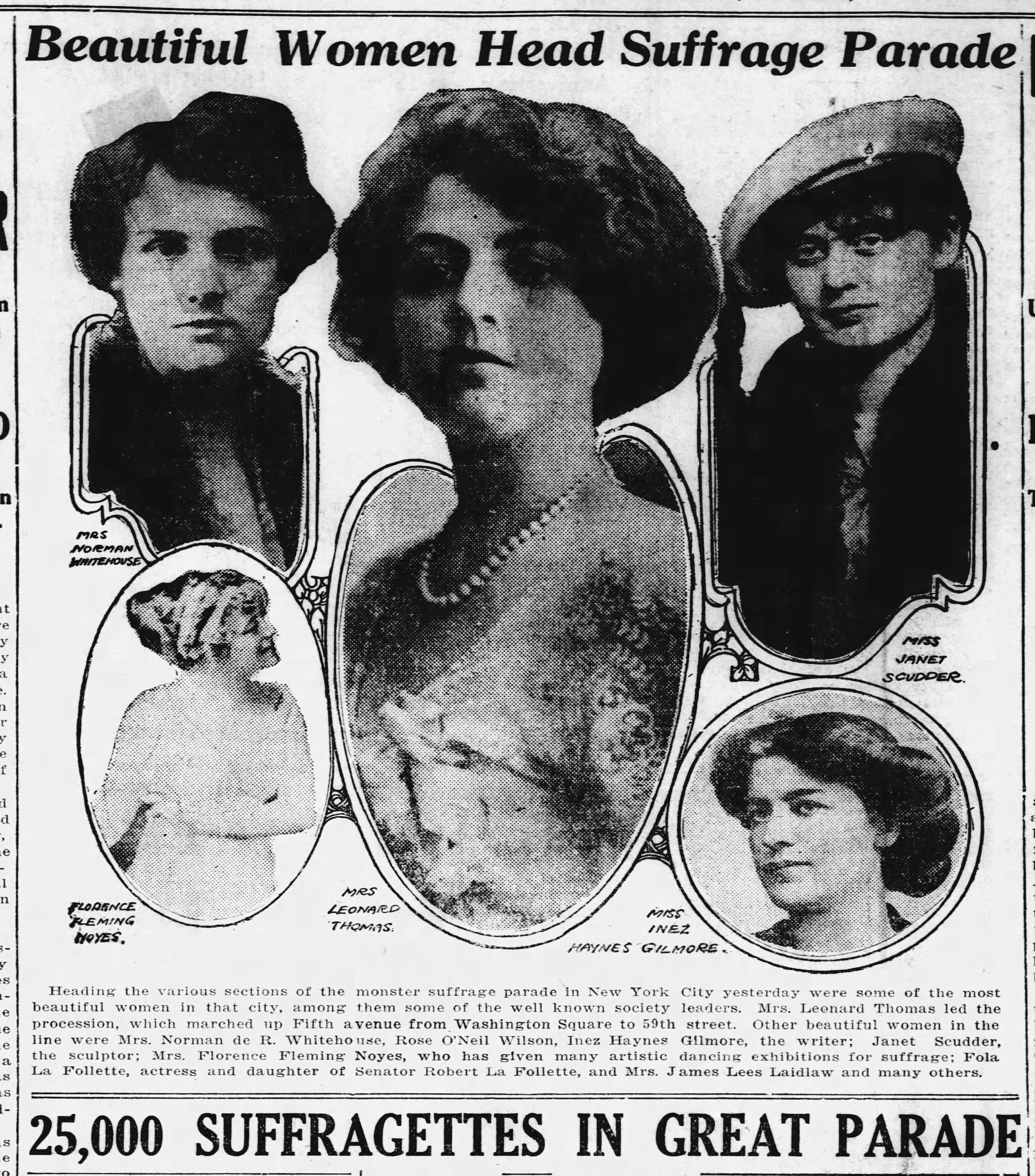
Beautiful Women Head Suffrage Parade in New York, 1915 Featured: Mrs. Norman Whitehouse, Florence Fleming Noyes, Mrs. Leonard Thomas, Janet Scudder, Inez Haynes Gilmore

- Edith Ainge
- Margaret Chanler Aldrich
- Lillian Anderson Turner Alexander
- Ann Allebach
- Charlotte Bolles Anthony
- Mary Stafford Anthony
- Susan B. Anthony.

B

- Minta Beach
- Caroline Lexow Babcock
- Elnora M. Babcock
- Isabel Barrows
- Juanita Breckenridge Bates
- Robert Cameron Beadle—member of the Men's League.
- Mary Ritter Beard
- Alva Belmont
- Emily Montague Mulkin Bishop (1858–1916) – lecturer, instructor, author, pioneer suffragist.
- Frances Maule Bjorkman
- Irene Moorman Blackstone (1872–after 1944) – African-American suffragist instrumental in integrating the suffrage fight in New York.
- Katherine Devereux Blake (1858–1950) – educator, suffragist, peace activist.
- Lillie Devereux Blake
- Harriot Stanton Blatch
- Minta Bosley Allen Trotman
- Helen Varick Boswell
- Gertrude Foster Brown (1867–1956) – pianist, suffragette, author of Your vote and how to use it (1918).
- Emma Bugbee (1888–1981) – journalist.
- Helen Louise Bullock
- Celia M. Burleigh
- Lucy Burns (1879–1966) – women's rights advocate, co-founder of the NWP.
- Abigail Bush
- Elinor Byrns

C

- Jennie Curtis Cannon (1851–1929) – Vice President of NAWSA.
- Mariana Wright Chapman (1843–1907) – American social reformer, suffragist.
- Tennessee Celeste Claflin (1844–1923) – one of the first women to open a Wall Street brokerage firm, advocate of legalized prostitution.
- Elizabeth V. Colbert
- Emily Parmely Collins (1814–1909) – in South Bristol, New York, 1848, was the first woman in the U.S. to establish a society focused on woman suffrage and women's rights.
- Ida Craft (1861–1947) – known as the Colonel, took part in Suffrage Hikes.
- George William Curtis

D

- Mabel Potter Daggett
- Katharine Bement Davis
- Sarah Dolley
- George T. Downing
- Gudrun Løchen Drewsen

E

- Genevieve Earle
- Max Eastman—member of the Men's League.
- Mary E. Eato
- Helen Gilbert Ecob

F

- Nellie Fassett
- Jessica Garretson Finch
- Sarah D. Fish

G

- Olive Stott Gabriel
- Matilda Joslyn Gage
- Sarah J. Garnet
- Rhoda Fox Graves
- Cordelia A. Greene (1831–1905), physician; honorary president, Wyoming County, New York Suffrage Association.
- Jean Brooks Greenleaf (1832–1918) – president, New York State Suffrage Association (1890–96).
- Helen Hoy Greeley (1878–1965) – Secretary, New Jersey Next Campaign (1915), stump speaker, organizer, and mobilizer in California and Oregon campaigns (1911), speaker for Women's Political Union in NYC.
- Mary Young Cheney Greeley

H

- Mary Halton
- Oreola Williams Haskell (1875–1953) – prolific author and poet, who worked alongside other notable suffrage activists, such as Carrie Chapman Catt, Mary Garrett Hay, and Ida Husted Harper.
- Lydia Sayer Hasbrouck
- Mary Garrett Hay (1857–1928) – suffrage organizer around the United States.
- Mary Foote Henderson
- Ami Mali Hicks
- Margaret Hinchey
- Helen Holman (1894–?) – African-American suffragist and political activist
- Marie Jenney Howe
- Mary Seymour Howell
- Maud Humphrey
- Arria Sargent Huntington
- Addie Waites Hunton (1866–1943) – suffragist, race and gender activist, writer, political organizer, educator.

I

- Maud Ingersoll Probasco

J

- Mary Corinna Putnam Jacobi (1842–1906) – medical physician, teacher, scientist, and writer.
- Paula O. Jakobi
- Hester C. Jeffrey (1842–1934) – African American community organizer, creator of the Susan B. Anthony clubs.
- Rosalie Gardiner Jones (1883–1978) – socialite, took part in Suffrage Hike, known as "General Jones."
- Verina Morton Jones

K

- Edna Buckman Kearns (1882–1934) – National Woman's Party campaigner, known for her horse-drawn suffrage campaign wagon (now in the collection of New York State Museum).
- Harriette A. Keyser (1841–1936) – industrial reformer, social worker, author; co-organizer, New York Woman Suffrage Association.
- Harriette A. Keyser
- Florence Ledyard Cross Kitchelt (1874–1961) – settlement house worker, socialist, and suffragist.
- Anna M. Kross

L

- Mabel Ping-Hua Lee (1896–1966) – suffragist, advocate for women's rights and for the Chinese immigrant community.
- Clara Lemlich
- Miriam Leslie (1836–1914) – publisher, author; namesake of the Leslie Woman Suffrage Commission.
- Cynthia Leonard
- Mary Lilly
- Henrietta Wells Livermore
- Rose Livingston
- Sophia Monté Neuberger Loebinger
- Mary Hillard Loines
- Clemence S. Lozier
- Maritcha Remond Lyons

M

- Pauline Arnoux MacArthur
- Katherine Duer Mackay (1878–1930) – founder of the Equal Franchise Society.
- Theresa Malkiel (1874–1949) – labor organizer and suffragist.
- Hazel MacKaye
- Jessie Belle Hardy Stubbs MacKaye
- Theresa Malkiel
- Maud Malone
- Wenona Marlin (New York City).
- Abbie K. Mason
- Annie Mathews
- Victoria Earle Matthews
- Samuel Joseph May
- Mary Ann M'Clintock (1800–1884) – suffragist who helped plan the 1848 Seneca Falls Convention.
- Thomas M'Clintock (1792–1876) – abolitionist and suffragist, husband of Mary Ann M'Clintock.
- Harriet May Mills (1857–1936) – prominent civil rights leader, played a major role in women's rights movement.
- Mary Molson
- Elisabeth Worth Muller

N

- Lyda D. Newman

O

- Martha B. O'Donnell (1836–1925) – temperance activist, newspaper and magazine editor and publisher.
- Eliza Wright Osborne

P

- Rhoda Palmer (1816–1919), participant in the Seneca Falls Convention and signer of the Declaration of Sentiments
- Herbert Parsons—member of the Men's League.
- Clara Louise Payne
- Mary Gray Peck.
- E. Jean Nelson Penfield, president, Woman Suffrage Party, 1910-12
- Amy and Isaac Post

R

- Charlotte B. Ray
- Eugénie M. Rayé-Smith
- Alice Riggs Hunt
- Belle de Rivera (1848–1943) – clubwoman; president, New York Equal Suffrage League.
- Ruth Logan Roberts (1891–1968) – suffragist, activist, YWCA leader, and host of a salon in Harlem.
- Elizabeth Selden Rogers
- Margaret Hayden Rorke

S

- Ida Sammis
- Nina Samorodin (1892–1981) – Russian-born NWP member, executive secretary of National Labor Alliance for Trade Relations with and Recognition of Russia, secretary of Women's Trade-Union League.
- Eleanor Butler Sanders
- Rose Schneiderman
- Janet Scudder.
- Sylvia B. Seaman
- Alice Wiley Seay
- Nettie Rogers Shuler (1862–1939) – writer, suffragist.
- May Gorslin Preston Slosson (1858–1943) – educator and first woman to obtain a doctoral degree in philosophy in the United States.
- Jane Norman Smith (1874–1953) – suffragist and reformer. Chairman of the National Woman's Party from 1927 to 1929.
- Elizabeth Smith Miller
- Alice D. Snyder (Poughkeepsie).
- Jean Spahr
- Clara B. Spence
- Lucy J. Sprague
- Elizabeth Cady Stanton
- Kathryn H. Starbuck
- Catharine A. F. Stebbins
- Susan McKinney Steward
- Kate Stoneman
- Alice Harrell Strickland

T

- Mary Burnett Talbert
- Kathleen de Vere Taylor
- Dorothy Thompson (1893–1961) – Buffalo and New York activist, later journalist and radio broadcaster.
- Katrina Ely Tiffany
- Elizabeth Richards Tilton (1834–1897) – founder of the Brooklyn Women's Club, poetry editor of The Revolution.
- Annie Rensselaer Tinker (1884–1924) – suffragist, volunteer nurse in World War I, and philanthropist.

U

- Adelaide Underhill

V

- Amelie Veiller Van Norman (1844–1920) – educator; president, Joan of Arc Suffrage League; vice-president, New York County Suffrage League; member, Suffrage Party, New York City.
- Narcissa Cox Vanderlip
- Fanny Garrison Villard
- Oswald Garrison Villard—member of the Men's League.

W

- Lillian Wald
- Mary Edwards Walker
- Anna White
- Vira Boarman Whitehouse
- Rosalie Loew Whitney
- Julia Wilbur
- Catherine Mary Douge Williams
- Portia Willis
- Martha Coffin Wright

== Suffragists who campaigned in New York ==
- L. J. C. Daniels.
- Laura M. Johns.

== See also ==
- List of African American suffragists
- List of American suffragists
