= Katherine Williams =

Katherine, Catherine, Katharine, Kathryn or Kathy Williams may refer to:

- Katharine Isabella Williams (1848–1917), British chemist
- Kath Williams (1895–1975), Australian women's activist
- Katharine Williams, Australian judge
- Kathryn Williams (born 1974), English singer-songwriter
- Kathy Williams, a character in The Fog
- Catherine G. Williams (1914–2020), American social worker
- Catherine Mary Douge Williams (c. 1832–1884), African-American suffragist and educator

== See also ==
- Catharine R. Williams (1787–1872), American writer and suffragist
- Cathy Williams (born 1957), British writer of romance novels
- Kathryn Harby-Williams (born 1969), Australian netball player and television presenter
- Katherine Dienes (born 1970), also known as Katherine Dienes-Williams, a New Zealand-born organist and conductor
- Katie Williams (disambiguation)
- Kate Williams (disambiguation)
- Kathleen Williams (disambiguation)
- Williams (surname)
