= Elizabeth Colbert =

Elizabeth Colbert may refer to:

- Elizabeth V. Colbert (1865–1929), American politician from New York
- Elizabeth Colbert Busch (born 1954), American economist and politician from South Carolina

== See also ==
- Elizabeth Kolbert (born 1961), American journalist
