= Helen Holman =

African-American suffragist

- Born: 1894; St Louis (Missouri) or East St Louis (Illinois)
- Died: Unknown
- Other name: Helen A. Holman
- Occupation: Suffragist Activist

Helen Holman (also known as Helen A. Holman) (1894 - date of death unknown) was an African-American suffragist and political activist. She was active in New York, mainly in Harlem, but also travelled all around the country. Holman became known through her activism as a "stepladder speaker" in favour of women's suffrage.

She was involved in multiple organisations such as the Colored Women’s Suffrage Club of New York City, the National Negro Congress, the Kate Richard O’Hare Committee, and the Communist Party. Her involvement in the later caused her to be surveilled by state authorities.

== Early life and activism in New York City ==
=== Early life ===
Helen Holman was born in 1894 in East St Louis in Illinois, or in St Louis in Missouri. She migrated to New York and was already a known suffragist by 1915. She became known in Harlem through her public talks in favor of women's suffrage, before New York allowed women to vote in 1917.

=== Obtaining women's suffrage ===
Holman represents a central component to women suffrage: she managed to gather important numbers of people and would regularly lecture at locations such as the Harlem suffrage headquarters or the frequented corner of 133rd street and Lenox avenue.

During the last week leading to the 1917 vote, she would speak almost daily in the streets of Harlem.The Woman Suffrage party estimated to 15,000 the number of African American women eligible to vote in Harlem, once the law would be passed. To help women gain the right to vote in New York, Harlem women had been very active in campaigning. They were led by Holman who was a "stepladder speaker", and Mary K. Lewis.

Holman's fight for progress, however, was not limited to the subject of women's suffrage. Indeed, she was also a fervent advocate on matters of race and class. Holman justified women's right to vote based not only on the substantial contributions women make in the workplace, the home and society, but because she was also an outspoken activist for racial justice. She argued that “wom[e]n's work has moved from the home to the factories, to the trusts. We must therefore enter politics to rear our race with health. If women don't know any more about politics than the average man, I'll guarantee we will get along.” During this ballot of 1917, it is the Colored Women’s Suffrage Club of New York City , of which Holman was a part of, that led "the final push in Harlem".

=== NAACP and activism ===
In Brooklyn, she helped the NAACP target issues surrounding “Discrimination, segregation, peonage, lack of industrial opportunity and other questions of vital interest”. Holman was not of the opinion of those in favor of separatism, a subject that she even brought up in her speeches. For instance, in winter of 1918, she met with New York City's mayor as part of a group of fifty interracial women to advocate for the needs of a suffering and starving population.

Holman's activist engagement also included traveling the country speaking for women's voting rights.

She also served as a secretary and gave lectures under The National Negro Congress.

Despite a lack of information on Holman's political engagement during World War II, evidence suggests that she could have been part of the National Council of Negro Women.

=== The "stepladder speakers" ===
During the early 1920s, Holman became a prominent figure in the radical political landscape of Harlem. She was part of a group of activists, which included Grace P. Campbell and Elizabeth Hendrickson, known as "stepladder" speakers. These orators delivered public addresses from atop crates or ladders at busy thoroughfares and street corners to recruit supporters and disseminate left-wing ideas.

Professor Irma Watkins-Owens noted that Harlem street corners functioned as vital locations for alternative politics and social movements during this period. Although Black women were often excluded from formal leadership in early leftist organizations, Holman used the "stepladder" circuit to influence local radicalism directly. Her presence on the street-speaking circuit represented a departure from the male-dominated political norms of the era, which were often characterized by a "muscular" Black nationalism.

== Communism and surveillance ==
=== Socialism and the Kate Richard O'Hare Comitee ===
Holman was an active socialist activist: advocating for the Socialist Party in front of an interracial public on Harlem streets and teaching the foundations of socialism at the Rand School of Social Sciences.

In 1919, she was in service of the Kate Richard O’Hare Committee as Executive Secretary. The Kate Richard O’Hare Committee had been created to raise money and set free socialist Kate Richards O’Hare, who following the address of an anti-war speech in North Dakota had been accused of espionage and arrested by the government.

=== Involvement with the Communist Party ===
Holman joined the Communist Party partly through her dedication to the suffrage cause. She had gained fame in Harlem during the 1920s for speaking out against Black women's oppression under capitalism and her appreciation of the Soviet Family Code.

During the First Red Scare, Holman was surveilled by the state authorities alongside other radical Black women of the emerging “Old Left”, such as Grace P. Campbell. It is argued by Erik S. Mcduffie that the monitoring of Holman and Campbell contributed to the creation of a template for how the United States government would later surveil Black Communist women.

== Legacy ==
The scholar Lydia Lindsey attributes the theory of “triple oppression”, theorised by Claudia Jones, to the influence of radical Black women who were part of The National Negro Congress. This group of women included Helen Holman, alongside Louise Thompson Patterson and Audley Moore.
