= Men's League for Women's Suffrage =

The Men's League for Women's Suffrage may refer to:

- The Men's League, United States women's suffrage group, also known as the Men's Equal Suffrage League and the Men's League for Women's Suffrage
- The Men's League for Women's Suffrage (United Kingdom), United Kingdom women's suffrage group
