= Helen Gilbert =

Helen Gilbert may refer to:

- Helen Gilbert (artist)
- Helen Gilbert (actress)

== See also ==
- Helen Gilbert Ecob, American writer and suffragist
