= Kathleen Williams =

Kathleen Williams may refer to:

- Kathleen M. Williams (born 1956), U.S. federal judge
- Kathleen Mary Williams (1919–1974), Welsh literary scholar
- Kathleen Williams (gymnast) (born 1964), British Olympic gymnast
- Kathleen Williams (politician) (born 1961), Montana politician
- Kathleen Williams (theologian), Australian Sister of Mercy and theologian
- Kathlyn Williams (Kathleen Mabel Williams, 1879–1960), American actress
- Kay Williams (Kathleen Gretchen Williams Gable, 1916–1983), American actress
