= Kate Williams =

Kate Williams may refer to:

- Kate Williams (historian) (born 1974), British author, historian and TV presenter
- Kate Williams (actress) (born 1941), English actress
- Kate Williams (1875–1946), Welsh strongwoman with stage name Vulcana
- Kate Williams (pianist) (active since 2011), jazz pianist and daughter of guitarist John Williams
- Kate Williams (chef) (born 1984 or 1985), chef and restaurateur in Detroit, Michigan
- Kate Williams (rugby union), Welsh international rugby union player
- Kate Williams (judge), judge of the Supreme Court of New South Wales

== See also ==
- Kate Williamson (1931–2013), American actress
- Katie Williams (disambiguation)
- Katherine Williams (disambiguation)
