= Harriet May Mills =

American politician

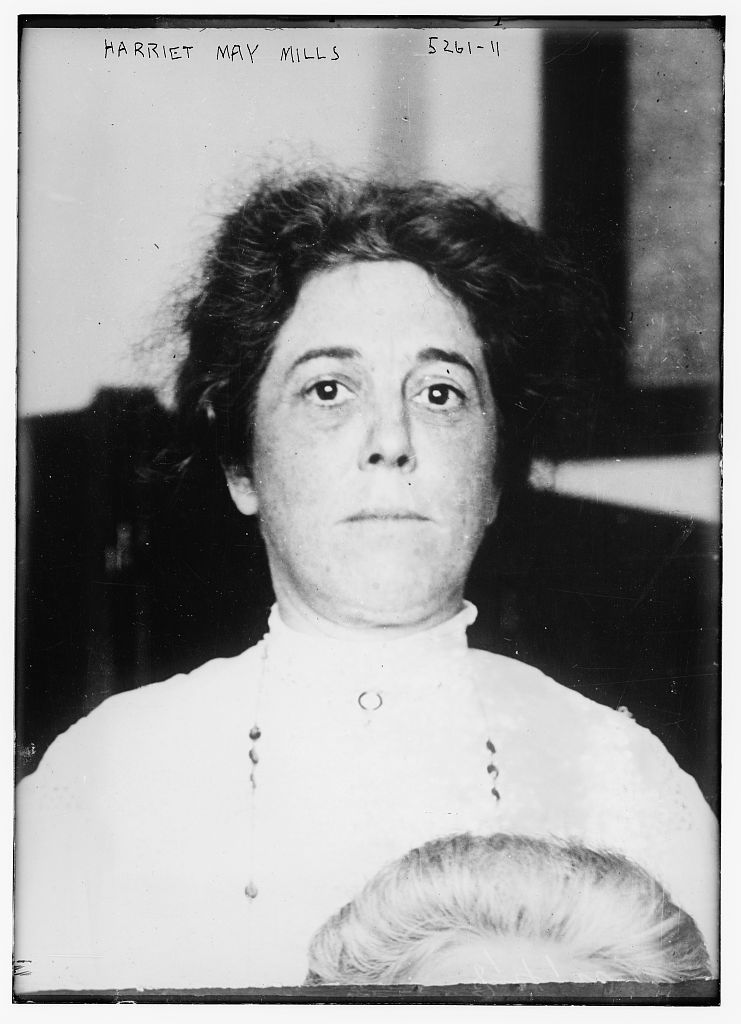
- Born: August 9, 1857; Syracuse, New York, US
- Died: May 16, 1935 (aged 77)
- Education: Cornell University

Harriet May Mills (August 9, 1857 – May 16, 1935) was a prominent American civil rights leader who played a pivotal role in the 19th century women's rights movement.

== Life ==
Mills was born on August 9, 1857, in Syracuse, New York, the daughter of Charles DeBerad Mills and Harriet Anne Smith. She graduated from Cornell University in 1879, having joined the school only two years after it began admitting women. Her father Charles was an abolitionist who was involved in the Jerry Rescue and had his house served as a safe harbor for escaped slaves as part of the Underground Railroad.

After finishing college, Mills organized one of the first and largest clubs in the country dedicated to the study of Robert Browning, and would become a widely known authority and lecturer on the poet. She first became an advocate for women's suffrage in 1892. She took an active part meeting, organizing, and speaking during the 1894 New York Constitutional Convention, speaking together with Susan B. Anthony and Anna Howard Shaw. She served as secretary, vice-president, and president of the New York State Suffrage Association, and was a member of the National Suffrage Association, Syracuse Suffrage Society, New York State Grange, and the American Association of University Women.

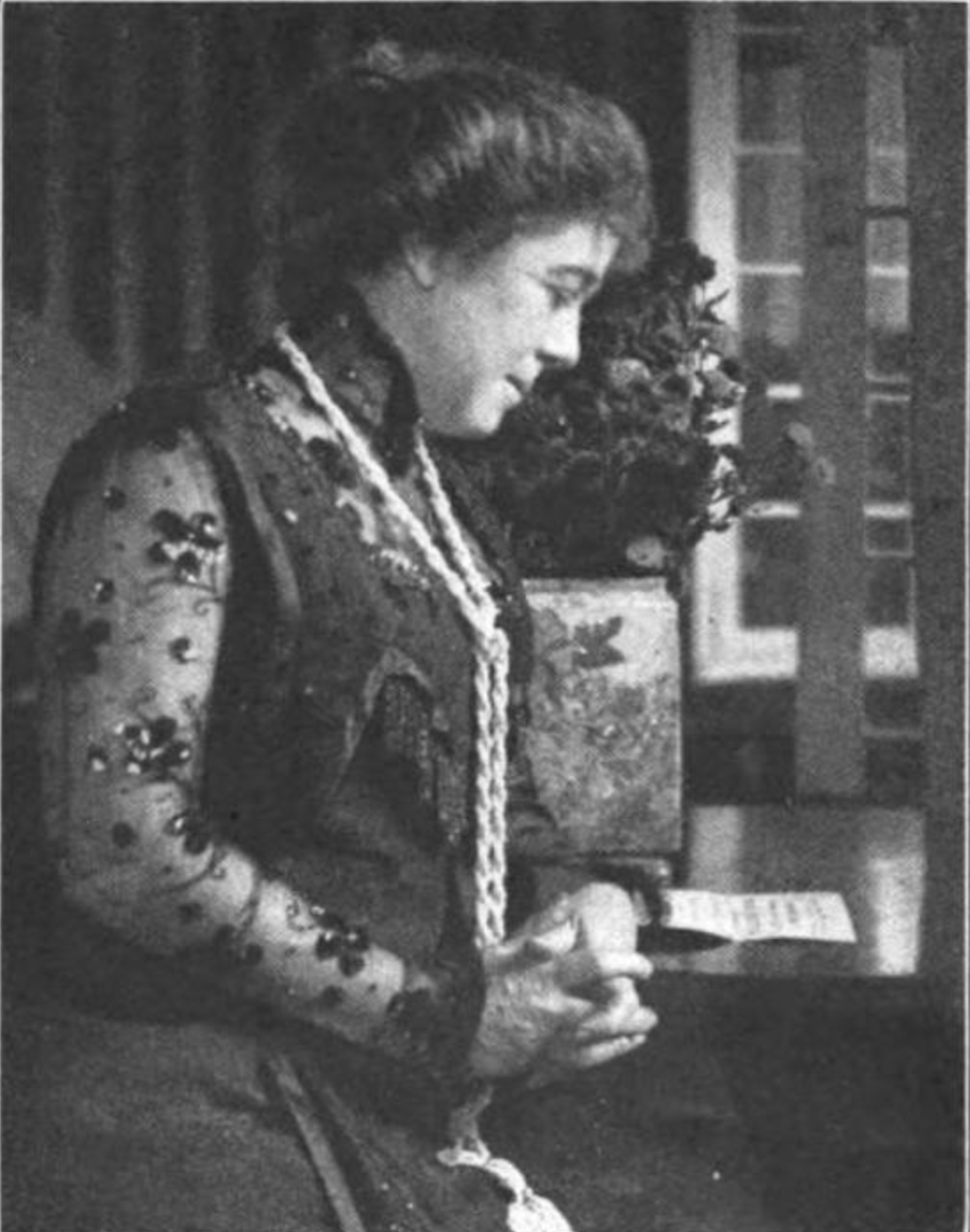
Mills in 1912

Mills was never married. She initially worked as a schoolteacher. She later worked as a paid statewide organizer for the suffrage movement. After the 19th Amendment extended the vote to women in 1920, she turned her attention to bringing women into political life. She was a delegate to the 1920 Democratic National Convention, and in the 1920 New York state election she was the Democratic candidate for Secretary of State of New York, making her the first women to run for state office in New York. She became a prominent member of the Democratic Party, working for both Al Smith 1928 presidential campaign and Franklin Delano Roosevelt's presidential election. She was a presidential elector for Roosevelt in the 1932 presidential election. She was friends with Franklin and Eleanor Roosevelt, and was an honored guest at the 1933 inauguration. In 1923, she was appointed the first woman New York State Hospital Commissioner.

A building at the New York State Fairgrounds was named in her honor - The Harriet May Mills Art & Home Center.

Mills died at Crouse-Irving Hospital from a chronic heart illness on May 16, 1935.

The Harriet May Mills House in Syracuse is listed in the National Register of Historic Places.

== See also ==
- Women's Suffrage
- List of American suffragists
- List of New York (state) suffragists

Party political offices
Preceded by Franklin E. Bard	Democratic nominee for Secretary of State of New York; 1920	Succeeded by James A. Hamilton
