= Katie Williams =

Katie Williams may refer to:

- Katie Williams (footballer) (born 1984), Welsh football defender
- Katie Williams, a character in Family Affairs
- Katie Williams (author), American writer

== See also ==
- Kate Williams (disambiguation)
- Katherine Williams (disambiguation)
- Williams (surname)
