= Ida Reid Blair =

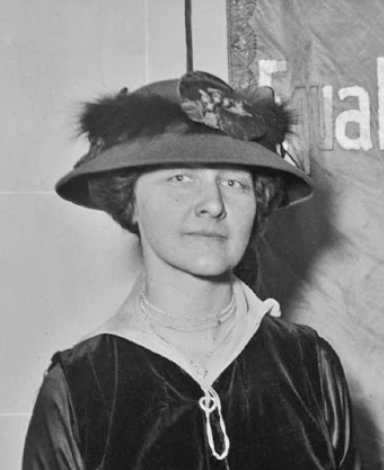
- Born: Ida Chester Reid; Putnam County, New York
- Died: November 5, 1930; 320 East 57th Street, New York City
- Occupations: social and political advocacy, business woman
- Years active: 1912-1930
- Known for: work for women's suffrage and other issues
- Spouse: John G. Blair
- Parents: Aaron Bertram Reid (father); Emma Gardiner Reid (mother)

Ida Reid Blair was a suffragist, businesswoman, and political activist who was particularly notable for her work in publicity for the New York state suffragist movement. She also founded the Women's Democratic Union in New York, which supported candidates and policies of the New York Democratic Party. She was usually called Mrs. John Blair in newspaper coverage.

== Women's Suffrage ==
In 1912 Mrs. Blair joined the Equal Franchise League, working for the vote for women, and in 1917 became chair of the press publicity committee for the New York State Woman Suffrage Party, which had been founded in 1909 by her friend Carrie Chapman Catt. Her most controversial publicity stunt was dropping pro-suffrage flyers from a biplane onto President Woodrow Wilson's yacht in December 1916. After the victory in November 1917 for women's suffrage in New York State, she became chair of the First Voter's School to educate women in how to vote. After its founding in 1920 to succeed the National American Woman Suffrage Association, she continued as a member of the League of Women Voters.

== Social Advocacy ==
In 1918, Mrs. Blair became field secretary of the Women's City Club. In 1921, the club examined New York's sanitary conditions and found many code violations that prompted Health Commissioner Copeland to form a Women's City Club Sanitary Reserve Corps. As field secretary of the club, she also addressed fire prevention, legislation to protect working women, and the creation of a national department of education.

== Business ==
In 1921, Mrs. Blair joined Mrs. Norman de R. Whitehouse as vice president of a leather goods manufacturer. After a year, she quit to become financial secretary for the Neurological Institute of New York, where she worked to raise funds until 1927.

== Politics ==
In 1924 Mrs. Blair founded the Women's Democratic Union, which worked for the Democratic ticket in state and local elections.
