= Vira Boarman Whitehouse =

American suffragette

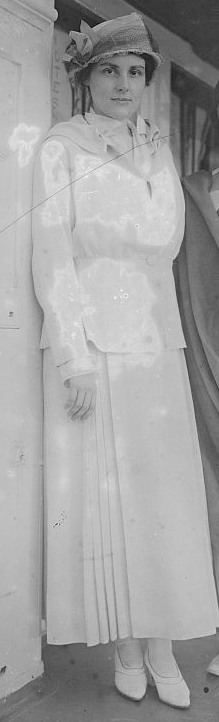
- Born: Vira Boarman; September 16, 1875; New Orleans, Louisiana
- Died: April 11, 1957 (aged 81); New York City, New York, U.S.
- Known for: Suffragette
- Spouse: James Norman de Rapelye Whitehouse (m. 1898; died 1949)
- Children: Alice Whitehouse Harjes

Vira Boarman Whitehouse (September 16, 1875 – April 11, 1957) was an American suffragette, government official, and businessperson. She was the owner of the Whitehouse Leather Company and an early proponent of birth control. She directed the Swiss office of the Committee on Public Information in 1918.

== Early life ==
Vira Boarman was born in Abingdon, Virginia, September 16, 1875, to Robert Boarman and Cornelia Terrell.

She attended Newcomb College in New Orleans and was a member of Pi Beta Phi.

She married New York stockbroker James Norman de Rapelye Whitehouse (1858–1949) on April 13, 1898. They had one child, Alice Whitehouse Harjes.

== Suffrage ==
Whitehouse became interested in suffrage after the Woman suffrage parade of 1913 erupted into violence. She marched in the May 1913 suffrage parade in New York City and volunteered with the Women's Political Union after the parade. Six months later Whitehouse gave her first outdoor suffrage speech.

She was chairman in 1913 of the publicity council of the Empire State Campaign Committee and in 1916 of the New York State Woman Suffrage Party (NYSWSP).

In May 1915, Whitehouse made cold calls to potential voters to ask their views on suffrage. This is one of the earliest examples of telephone polling.

Whitehouse led a successful fundraising campaign, making large donations herself and soliciting donations from New York's most prominent families.

When New York State granted women the right to vote on November 6, 1917, Whitehouse was widely credited with the win.

Whitehouse's husband was a member of the Men's League for Women's Suffrage, by July 1917 he was treasurer of the League.

== Foreign service ==
In 1918, she became director of the Swiss office of the Committee on Public Information, where she worked closely with Rosika Schwimmer, the Hungarian ambassador to Switzerland, and one of the first female ambassadors in the world. This appointment was a direct result of her success in the suffrage movement. George Creel, head of the United States Committee on Public Information, had formerly been the publicity chair for the New York chapter of the Men's League for Women's Suffrage. He explained Whitehouse's appointment as "Mrs. Whitehouse's job was to put America across in Switzerland the way she had put equal suffrage across in New York." Her main job in Switzerland was to provide accurate information to Swiss newspapers interested in American affairs without violating Switzerland's policy of neutrality. She held the position for eleven months, but only spent six months actively working in Switzerland. Nevertheless, her work was considered successful. Whitehouse reported her experiences in A Year as a Government Agent (1920).

== Later life ==
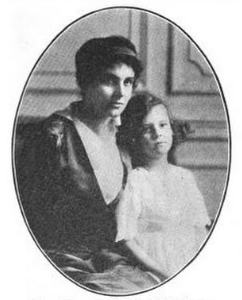
Vira Boarman Whitehouse, 1921

In 1921, she bought the Buchan-Murphy Manufacturing Company, a leather business, renamed it the Whitehouse Leather Products Company, Inc., and reorganized it with herself as president and Ida Reid Blair as vice-president. She managed the company for eight years, reducing the work week from 48 hours to 44 hours, among other changes.

In 1925, she was elected a member of the Democratic County Committee from Manhattan's 15th Assembly District.

The following year, she became Chairman of the Independent Women's Committee for Judge Wagner. She sold her leather company before the stock market crash of 1929.

She died at her home in New York City on April 11, 1957.

== Legacy ==
Her papers are archived at the Harvard University Library.

== Gallery ==
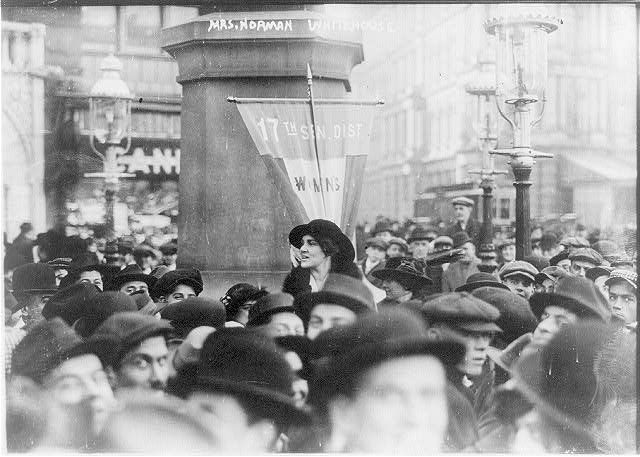
Mrs. Norman Whitehouse making a street speech for suffrage, December 1913.

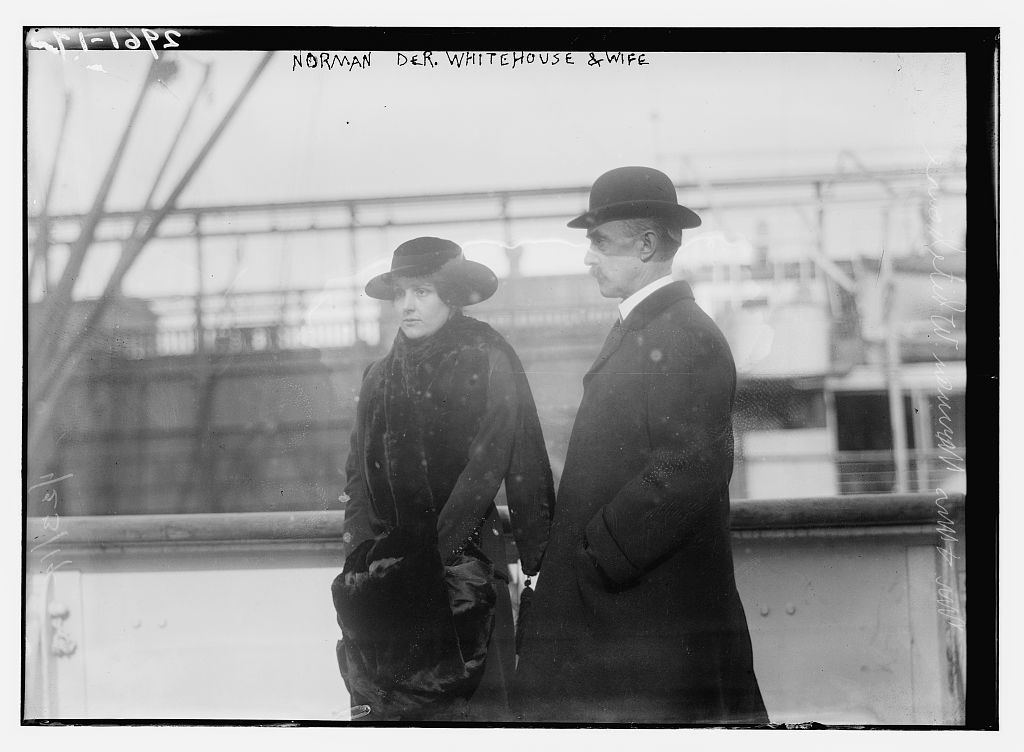
Mr. and Mrs. Norman DeR. Whitehouse in 1914
