= Katherine G. Ecob =

American psychologist

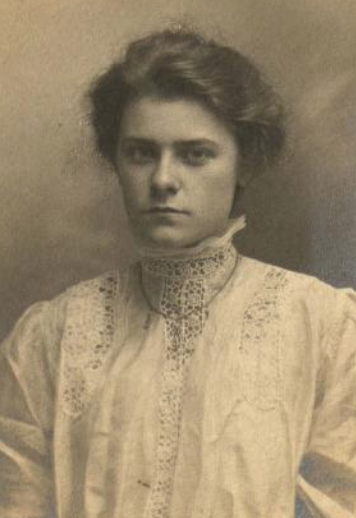
- Katherine G. Ecob, from the 1909 yearbook of Bryn Mawr College
- Born: Katherine Gilbert Ecob; February 11, 1887; Albany, New York
- Died: January 25, 1971 (aged 83); New York
- Education: Bryn Mawr College; Columbia University
- Occupations: Psychologist, educator
- Mother: Helen Gilbert Ecob
- Relatives: Kuno Francke (uncle); Carl Beck (brother-in-law)

Katherine Gilbert Ecob (February 11, 1887 – January 25, 1971) was an American psychologist and educator.

== Early life and education ==
Ecob was born in Albany, New York, the daughter of James Henry Ecob and Helen Lathrop Gilbert Ecob. Her father was a Congregational clergyman. Her mother was active in the National Council of Women and noted advocate for women's suffrage and dress reform. Ecob's aunt Katherine Gilbert married scholar Kuno Francke; and her sister Frances married Carl Beck, a songwriter and businessman.

Ecob graduated from Bryn Mawr College in 1909, in the same class as poet Marianne Moore, athlete Cynthia Wesson, playwright Tracy Dickinson Mygatt, and educator Barbara Spofford Morgan. She earned a master's degree in psychology at Columbia University.

== Career ==
In the 1920s, Ecob was a field agent for the New York State Commission for Mental Defectives. In the 1930s and 1940s, she was executive secretary of the Mental Hygiene department of the New York State Charities Aid Association. She spoke at meetings of educators and government officials. She encouraged the development of community clinics and child guidance centers to address mental health concerns before they progress and prompt legal or institutional interventions. During World War II, she spoke on the need to screen military recruits for mental fitness. Her writings on developmental disability were reprinted in newspapers across the United States. She also reviewed books in her field.

She was president of the Bryn Mawr Club of New York, and in that capacity corresponded with her classmate Marianne Moore. She was a charter member of the Butternut Valley Garden Club in 1926, and remained involved with the group for at least forty years.

== Publications ==
- "Coordinated Planning for Mental Defectives" (1942)
- Deciding What's Best for Your Retarded Child (1955, pamphlet)
- The Retarded Child in the Community: Practical Suggestions for Community Care (1955, pamphlet)
- The Mentally Retarded in Society (1959, with Stanley Powell Davies)

== Personal life ==
Ecob died in 1971, at the age of 83, in New York.
