= Sarah D. Fish =

American suffragist, abolitionist

- Born: Sarah Davids Bills; 11 September 1798; Union, New Jersey, US
- Died: 7 November 1868 (aged 79); Rochester, New York, US
- Occupations: Abolitionist, suffragist
- Spouse: Benjamin Fish (m. 1822)
- Children: Catharine A. F. Stebbins, Mary Fish Curtis

Sarah Davids Bills Fish (1798–1868) was a 19th-century American suffragist and abolitionist. She has been variously known as Sarah Fish, Sarah D. Fish, Sarah David Bills, and Sarah David Bills Fish.

== Life ==
Sarah Fish was born 11 September 1798 in Union, Union County, New Jersey, US.

In 1822, she married Benjamin Fish. The couple were radical Quaker abolitionists. "When the Orthodox and Hicksite Quakers split in 1828, primarily over the issue of how actively slavery ought to be opposed, the Fishes joined the Hicksites—the more zealously abolitionist sect—and moved to Rochester." The couple had two daughters: Catherine Ann Fish (later Stebbins) and Mary Fish (later Curtis). Letters suggest the couple were living in Rochester, New York, circa 1848 and were involved also in the rise of spiritualism.

== Activism ==
Their family was "one of the most prominent early anti-slavery advocate groups." Their home was one of Rochester, New York's first way-stations of the Underground Railroad. They collaborated with Railroad conductors such as Frederick Douglass, Mary H. Post Hallowell, William R. Hallowell, and Amy and Isaac Post. The Fish family "helped organize everything from abolitionist conventions to antislavery craft fairs." Some Quaker assemblies viewed slave ownership as a lawful form of property. In the case of the Fish family, they were ousted from their congregation for their abolitionist activities.

Sarah herself was a member of the Rochester Female Anti-Slavery Society (RFASS), and for a period served as the group's secretary. The RFASS "for a few years" "dominated women's antislavery activism," but was eventually replaced by a more radical group. In 1842, Sarah joined the Western New York Anti-Slavery Society and, at the urging of Quaker activist Abby Kelley, served on the executive committee. She was still serving on the executive committee in 1848, when her husband was president and her son-in-law corresponding secretary. She also wrote for the abolitionist newspaper The North Star.

Sarah Fish was also an early activist for women's rights. She participated in the very first Seneca Falls Convention in 1848. Only weeks later, Sarah helped organize a second women's rights convention in Rochester, a convention of which her daughter Catherine was a secretary, and on "August 2, 1848, Sarah D. Fish delivered an address to the Rochester Woman's Rights Convention". Other important attendees included Frederick Douglass. Sarah Fish, Amy Post, and Sarah Hallowell "made the historic recommendation that the Rochester Woman's Rights Convention elect a female president." It is reported that "This was so radical a step that, amazingly, Elizabeth Cady Stanton and Lucretia Mott, two organizers of the Seneca Falls convention, walked off the platform in protest when Bush took the chair!"

The Fish family were also apparently involved in working for fairer treatment of Native Americans.

== Death ==
She died on 7 Nov 1868 at the age of 70 in Rochester, Monroe County, New York, US.
