= Kathleen Mary Williams =

Welsh literary scholar

- Born: 11 June 1919; Wales, United Kingdom
- Died: 4 December 1974 (aged 55); Riverside, California, U.S.
- Occupation: Literary scholar
- Awards: Guggenheim Fellowship (1973)

Academic background
- Education: Somerville College, Oxford; University of Wales

Kathleen Mary Williams (11 June 1919 – 4 December 1974) was a Welsh literary scholar. Originally a civil servant at the Ministry of Food during World War II, she taught at University College of South Wales and Monmouthshire and was a professor at University of California, Riverside until her death. A 1973 Guggenheim Fellow, she published the books Jonathan Swift and the Age of Compromise (1958) and Spenser's World of Glass: The Faerie Queene (1966).

== Biography ==
=== Early life and academic career ===
Williams, an only child, was born on 11 June 1919 in Wales, and raised near the England–Wales border. Her father C. R. Williams worked in Newport, Wales, as their rail controller. She was educated at Haberdashers' Monmouth School for Girls; Somerville College, Oxford, where she got her BA with first-class honours in 1941 and her MA in 1945; and the University of Wales, where she obtained her DLitt in 1964.

Williams originally worked as a civil servant during World War II, including as administrative assistant and secretary to Minister of Food Gwilym Lloyd George. She worked at University College of South Wales and Monmouthshire as senior lecturer of English. She later emigrated to the United States and, with the exception of a one-year period (1966-1967) as a full professor at Rice University, worked at University of California, Riverside from 1964 until her death; she was an assistant professor during her first term at UC Riverside, later becoming a full professor upon her return.

Williams published the books Jonathan Swift and the Age of Compromise (1958) and Spenser's World of Glass: The Faerie Queene (1966). She chaired the graduate council at UC Riverside and was part of the Modern Language Association Executive Council. In 1973, she was awarded a Guggenheim Fellowship, for "a study of English satire and pastoral from the Renaissance to the 18th century".

=== Personal life and death ===
Williams had acute sinusitis, which she developed during her civil service work in World War II. Prior to emigrating to the United States, she lived in a country house in Usk, Monmouthshire. Her father died in a car crash while he and Williams were returning from Houston.

Williams died on 4 December 1974, in Riverside, California.

== Bibliography ==
- Jonathan Swift and the Age of Compromise (1958)
- Spenser's World of Glass: The Faerie Queene (1966)
