= Nina Samorodin =

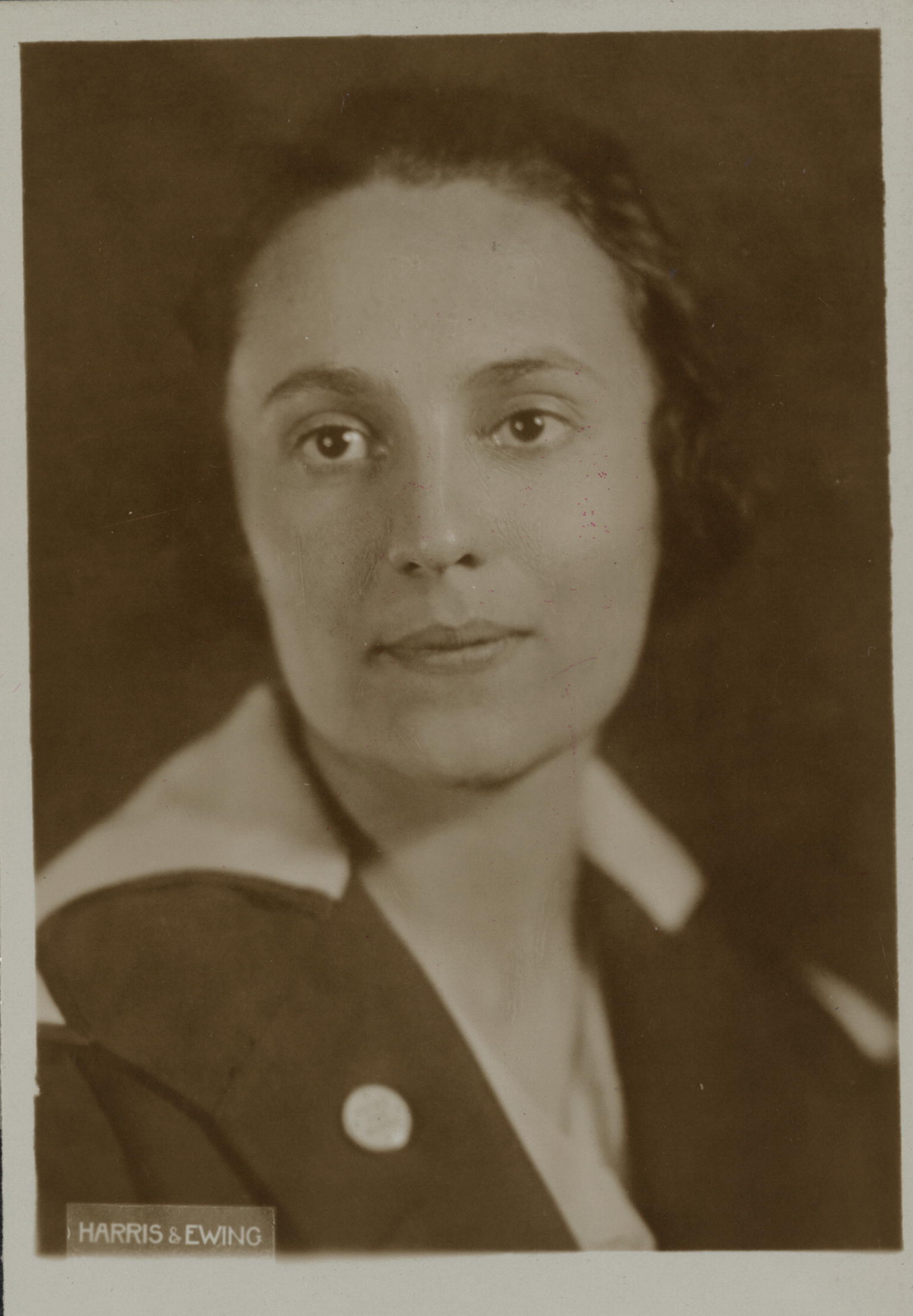
- Born: Kyiv
- Alma mater: Taras Shevchenko National University of Kyiv
- Occupation: Suffragist

Nina Samorodin (July 4, 1892 – November 28, 1981) was born in Kiev, Russian Empire to a Jewish family. Samorodin took advantage of increasing educational opportunities available to Jews in the city and graduated from Kiev University. After immigrating to the United States in 1914, she became involved in both union and women's activism. Samorodin was a factory worker and then general organizer of the Shirt Makers’ Union of Philadelphia. She was the executive secretary of the National Labor Alliance for Trade Relations with and Recognition of Russia. By 1922, she was also the secretary of the Women's Trade-Union League. Additionally, she taught at the Rand School of Social Science in New York City. However, Samorodin is most well known for her work with the National Woman's Party.

== Personal life ==
Samorodin married Anthony Ramuglia, Italian manager of a labor union, in 1919. Samorodin took Ramuglia's name after their marriage and became known as Nina S. Ramuglia thereafter. Together, they had one son, Anthony Ramuglia, in 1923. By 1938, the Ramuglia family was living in Los Angeles, California, and they had moved to Pasadena, California by 1958. Samorodin died in Fresno, California, in 1981.

== Personal inquiries ==
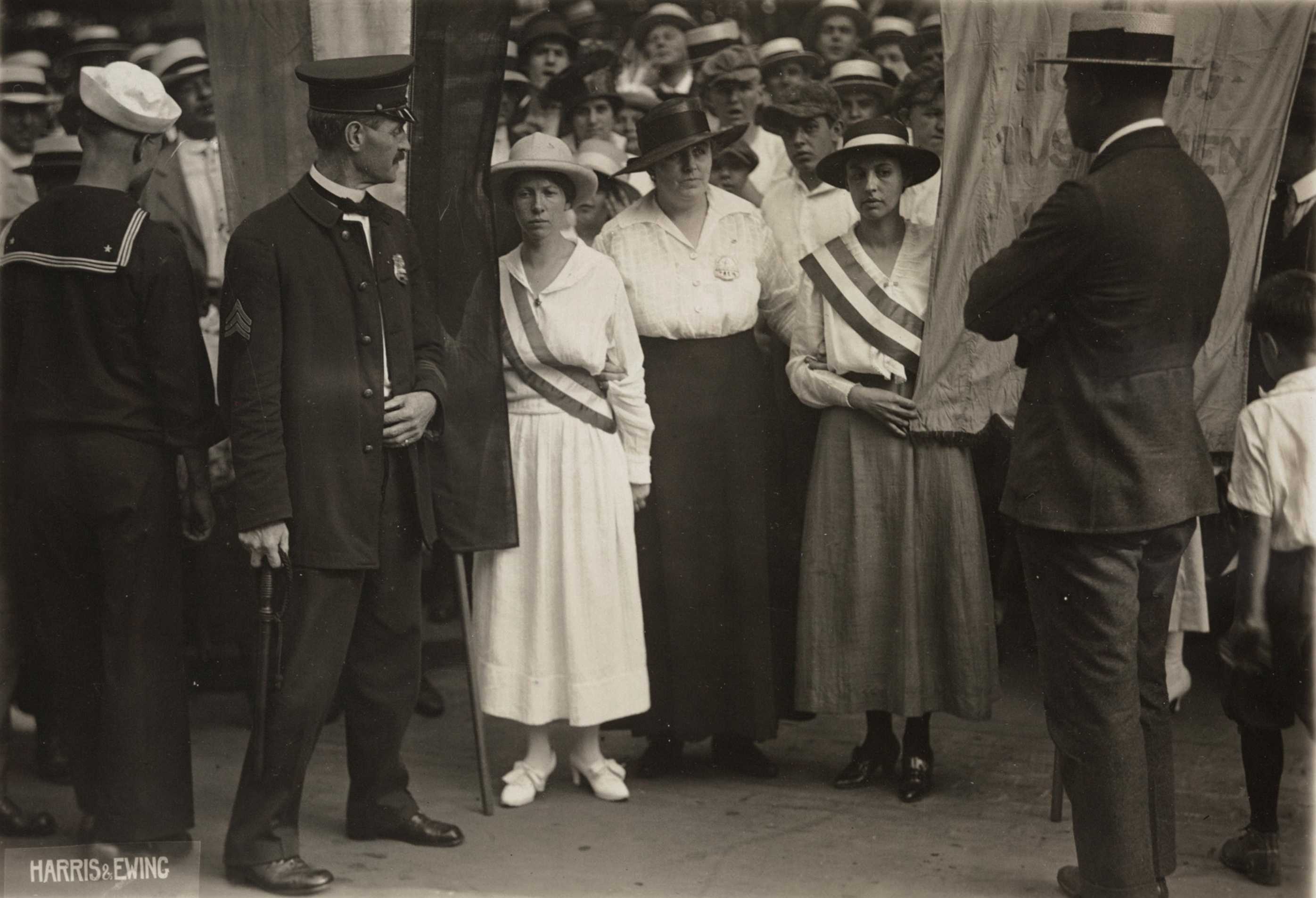
Arrest of White House pickets

Samorodin wrote about her self-discovery as a suffragist. A recovered text that Nina wrote explained her confusion as to why females were not seen as equivalent to males in society. Her questions were answered with the simple biological fact that male and female are not mentally equal. Her interest was sparked after she began to research the biological differences between males and females, through which she came to the conclusion that women developed differently than men regardless of circumstances. However, she did stay true to her belief that any working woman should advocate for herself and her representation.

== Occoquan Workhouse ==
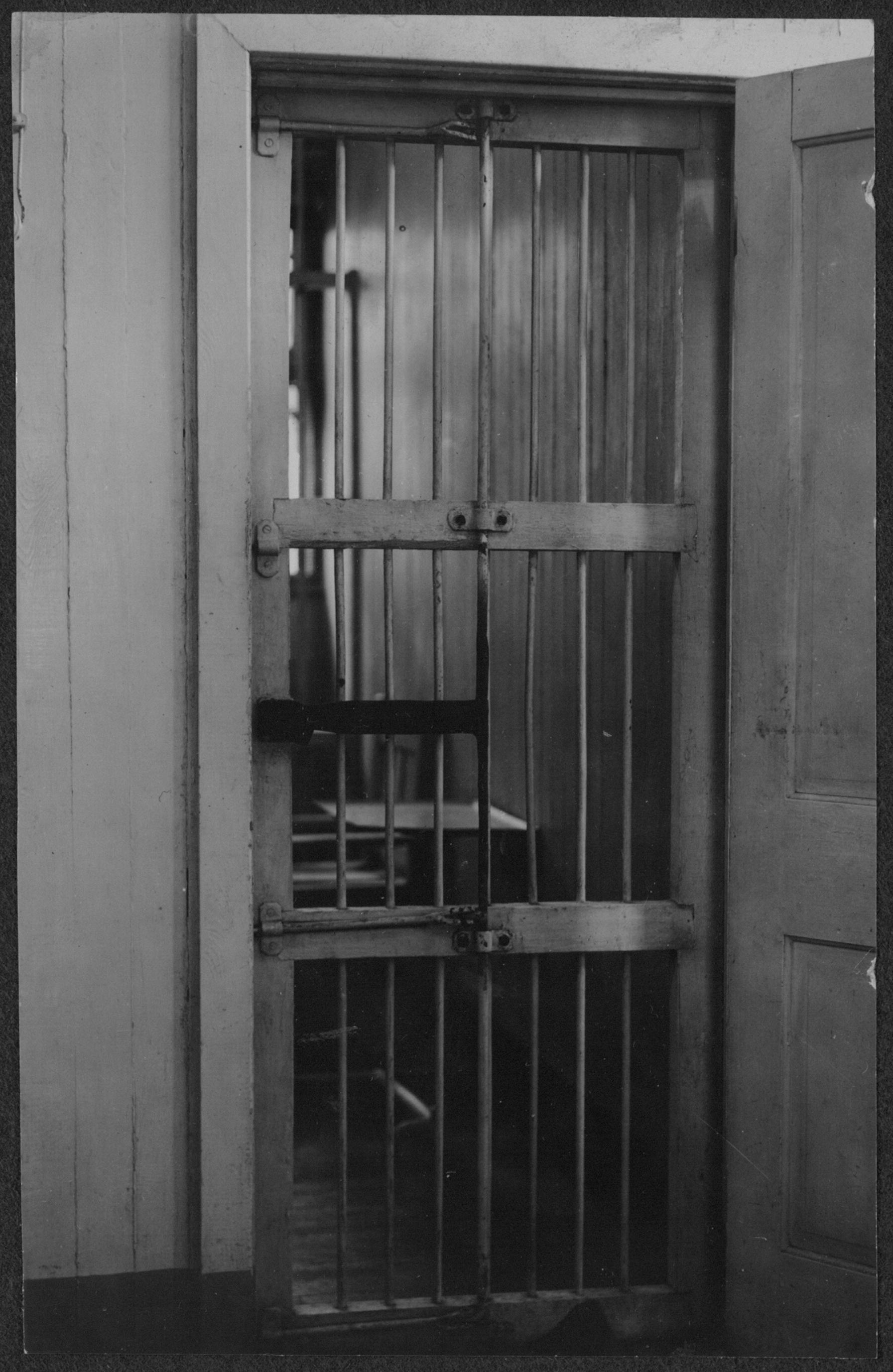
Cell at Occoquan

On September 13, 1917, during a peaceful protest, Samorodin carried a banner to one of the White House gates. Accused of obstructing traffic, Samorodin was arrested, tried, sentenced, and incarcerated for thirty days in the Occoquan Workhouse in Lorton, Virginia. While imprisoned, a fellow suffragist named Mary Winsor said that the suffragists in jail would sing the “Occoquan Song,” a tune “set to Russian music by Miss Nina Samorodin.” While in Occoquan, Samarodin demanded for better healthcare and treatment. It was reported that the prisoners were deprived of basic sanitation and hygiene, were served rancid food, and suffered physical mistreatment and beatings for which they were denied critical medical care. Her sister Vera visited her from time to time and noticed her health rapidly depleting and reached out to Russian ambassador in hopes of upgrading her prison treatment by renaming her a “political prisoner” instead of “inmate." Upon release from Occoquan in the fall of 1917, she traveled to New York and taught a course in Russian language instruction at the Rand School of Social Science.

== "Quiet Life of an Organizer" ==
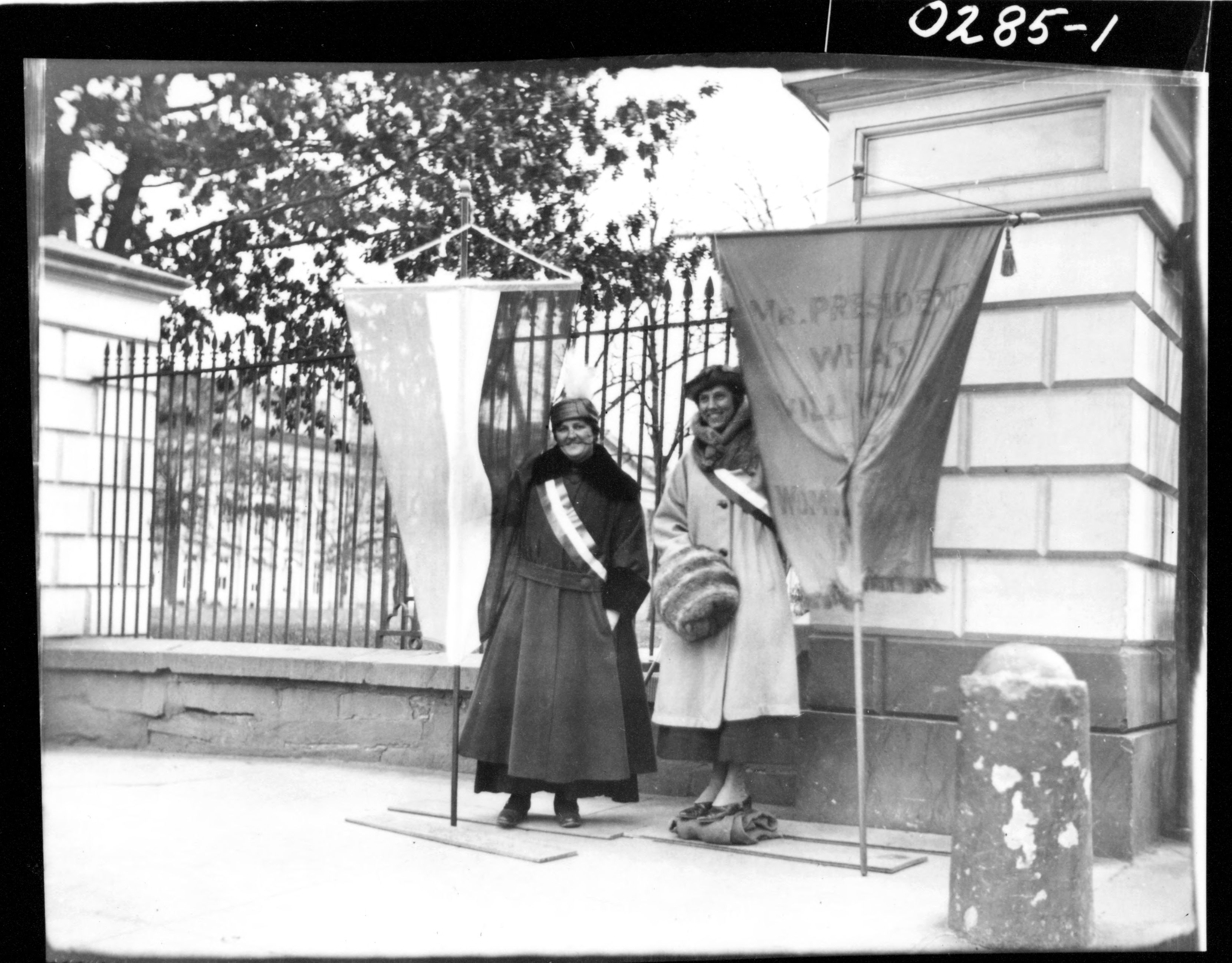
Picketing at the White House

In September 1918, Samorodin was an organizer for one of the branches of the International Ladies’ Garment Workers’ Union. Her job was to go to shops in Little Italy, New York City and unionize factories. In “The Quiet Life of an Organizer,” Samorodin explained that the union was reluctant to send her to Little Italy because all the previous organizers had been beaten up, but Samorodin insisted that she go. Samorodin faced backlash in her attempts to “organize” the factories. Once, she was attacked by three employers and the boss started to choke her. Samorodin recounted this incident and explained that the other women with her at the time fought back, jumping on the boss while the others got the police. Nina and the women escaped, but not without a threat from the boss: “We will get you yet.” Nina explained another instance where a different boss threatened to throw her out a third story window if she tried to organize his factory, telling her it would be his second murder.

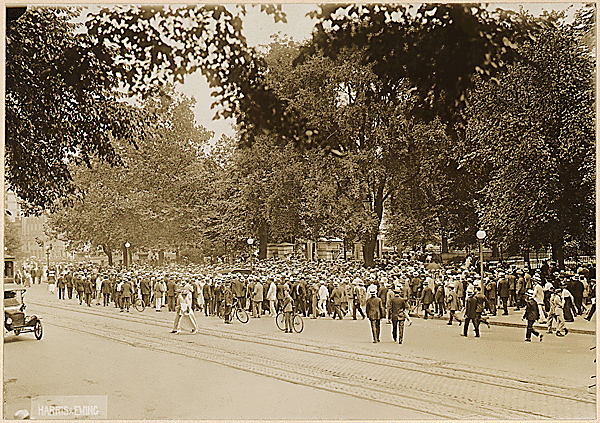
Washington crowd mobs the White House Pickets

== Communist involvements ==
After the 1920s, Samorodin abandoned most of her work with the National Woman's Party and focused her efforts on communist endeavors in America instead. Samorodin became the secretary-treasurer of the Council for the Protection of the Foreign Born, an organization protecting Communist immigrants in America. In 1927, Samorodin invited W.E.B. DuBois to be a member of the advisory board for this council; however, he declined her offer. In 1948 during the second “Red Scare,” Nina Samorodin's name was brought up in the “Report of the Senate Fact-Finding Committee on Un-American Activities.”
