= Robert Cameron Beadle =

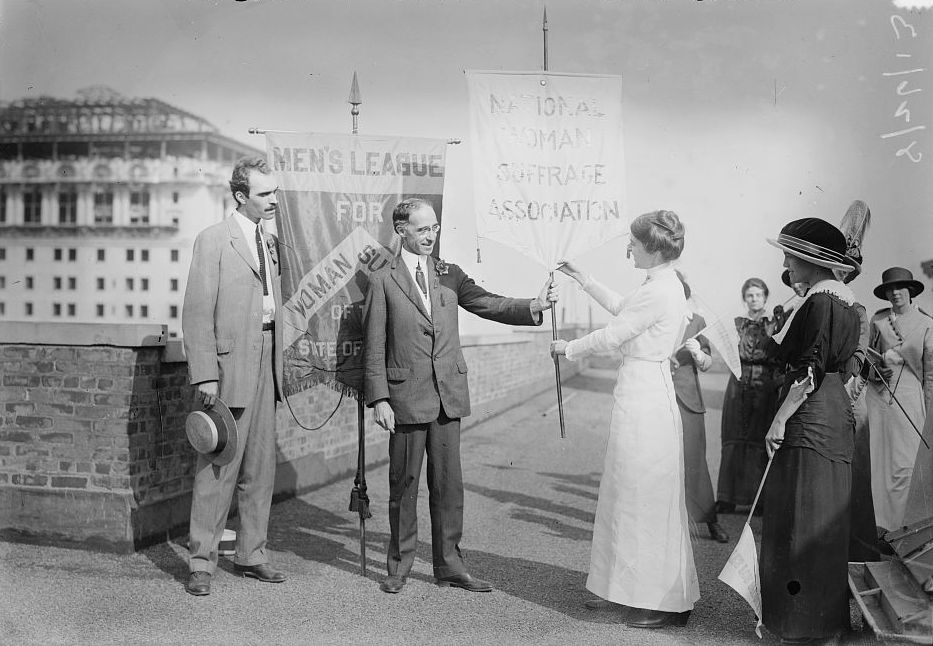
Robert Cameron Beadle, Alfred H. Brown and Frances Maule Bjorkman on August 26, 1913

Robert Cameron Beadle (October 19, 1883 – June 19, 1968) was an American public relations executive and civic leader who was Secretary of the Men's League for Woman Suffrage of the State of New York in 1913. He was president of the National Association for Middle-Aged Employees in 1930. He was the grandson of Erastus Flavel Beadle.

Beadle later joined the investment bank Spencer Trask & Co. and became secretary to one the company's partners, George Foster Peabody.
