= Arria Sargent Huntington =

American author and social reformer

Arria Sargent Huntington (January 22, 1848 – March 24, 1921) was the author of Under a Colonial Roof-Tree: Fireside Chronicles of Early New England which details daily life and family stories from early days of Hadley, Massachusetts.

Huntington was concerned with "fallen women" and founded The Shelter for Homeless Women and Girls, and the Working Girls Club. She was the first woman elected to public office in Syracuse, New York, where she served on the New York State Board of Education from 1897 to 1903. Her nomination caused a commotion because of her gender. She was also active in child welfare work helped pass some of the first child labor laws in New York state. She was on the board of trustees of the Shelter for Unprotected Girls and worked with the YWCA and the Girl's Patriotic League, in World War I. Huntington started the Visiting Nurses Association and was a founder of Syracuse Memorial Hospital.

Huntington was a public speaker on many topics and gave lectures such as "The Social Value of Educations in our Public Schools" as well as the promotion of women's suffrage.

== Personal life ==
Huntington was born in Roxbury, Massachusetts, to Hannah Dane Sargent and Bishop Frederic Dan Huntington, Huntington was the oldest five children. She grew up in Syracuse, New York.

== Books ==
- Sharps and Flats: A Farce (1896)
- Under a Colonial Roof-Tree: Fireside Chronicles of Early New England (1905)
- Memoir and letters of Frederic Dan Huntington, first bishop of central New York (1906)
