= Catharine A. F. Stebbins =

American abolitionist and suffragist

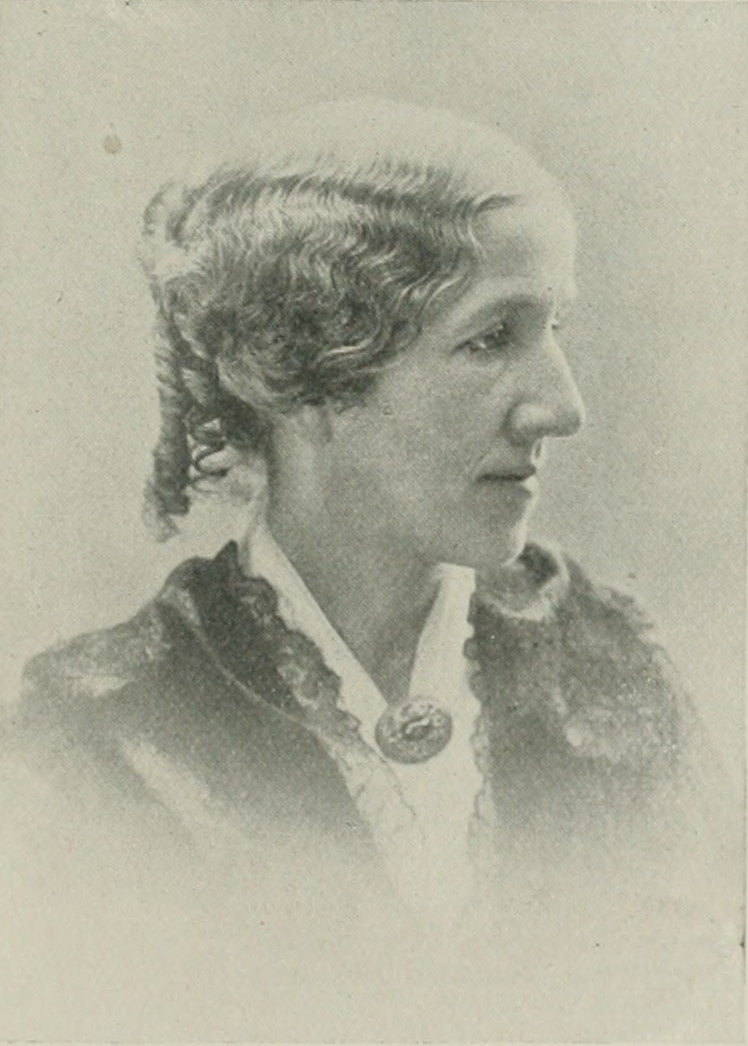

Catharine Ann Fish Stebbins (August 17, 1823 - 1904) was an American abolitionist and suffragist. She lectured against slavery and fought for her right to vote in New York and Michigan.

== Biography ==
Stebbins was born Catherine Ann Fish in Farmington, New York to a family of radical Quakers on August 17, 1823. Her mother was Sarah D. Bills Fish. The family moved to Rochester, New York when Stebbins was five and her parents started an abolitionist group in the city. Stebbins was involved as young as age twelve, collecting names for anti-slavery petitions. She assisted her family in operating one of the first waystations of the Underground Railroad in the city of Rochester, New York.

Stebbins became a teacher in Rochester. In 1842, she joined the Western New York Anti-Slavery Society (WNYASS). She married Giles Badger Stebbins in August 1846 in Sodus Bay. Her husband was an abolitionist as well, and together, they lectured and were involved in peaceful demonstrations for women's suffrage and the end of slavery. In 1848, Stebbins was at the first Woman's Rights Convention, where she was an active participant and contributed a resolution to the convention. In the early 1850s, she and her husband moved to Michigan.

When the National Woman Suffrage Association (NWSA) was founded in 1861, she joined. She and her husband also spoke that same year at the Michigan State Anti-Slavery Society. She was also anti-war and opposed her brother joining the Union during the Civil War. She helped refugees from the war.

In 1871, Stebbins attempted to register to vote in Michigan, but was denied. She then went with Nannette B. Gardner, who was asserting her right to vote as a widow and a taxpayer. Gardner was given the right to vote, but Stebbins was never able to register. In 1880, Stebbins was in charge of the Detroit NWSA convention. Stebbins was also on the committee to work on The Woman's Bible.

Stebbins died in 1904.
