= Elizabeth Anna Hendrickson =

Afro-American civil rights and political activist

Elizabeth Anna Hendrickson (1884–1946) was a notable Afro-American civil rights leader and political activist. Born in St Croix, while it was still a Danish colony before it was purchased by the US government and incorporated into the US Virgin Islands, hence its citizens were able to emigrate to the US mainland. Elizabeth was raised in St. Croix until 11 years old when she was sent to New York to stay with her aunt. In New York Elizabeth received a good education and went on to High School where she mixed with and was influenced by prominent white people of respectable backgrounds. Elizabeth became a member of the Quaker organisation and had a love child by G.E. Willett, son of an influential Quaker family from Quebec.

Elizabeth later became a prominent member of the Harlem Renaissance movement of east New York. She was a well-known street corner speaker and was involved in the struggles of the Harlem Tenants League in the 1920s. She helped to establish benevolent organizations, several groups in New York including the American West Indians Ladies Aid Society, and the Virgin Islands Catholic Relief Organization to help Virgin Islanders at home and in Harlem. She also assisted prominent Virgin Islander Rothschild Francis in establishing his paper, The Emancipator. (AWILAS) was called the Danish West Indians Ladies Aid Society when it was established in Harlem in 1915 to serve Danish West Indian immigrant women. At the time there were other Danish West Indian organizations in New York, but none geared specifically toward women. The AWILAS worked in conjunction with many other organizations in Harlem. Elizabeth Hendrickson served as president of the Society in 1924 and 1930.

Elizabeth Anna was a well-known street corner speaker and was involved in the struggles of the Harlem Tenants League in the 1920s. Harlem was a black metropolis, and West Indians were part of a larger, more Pan-African, demographic group. Of the Caribbean immigrants the Virgin Islander knew more about the U.S. and their discrimination against blacks due to the colonisation of the Danish Islands in 1917. With Ashley L. Totten she formed the Virgin Islands Protective Association, which aimed at addressing the mistreatment of those in their homeland. As radical street-corner speakers these Virgin Islander immigrants, such as Elizabeth Anna really shone. "The street corner became the most viable location for an alternative politics and the place where new social movements gained a hearing and recruited supporters". Authorities frequently blamed Caribbean immigrants for stirring up discontent in Harlem. Elizabeth Anna introduced her radical thoughts to a mass that was eager at least to listen to new ideas. In this way Elizabeth Anna, among other Virgin Islanders, played a significant part in the shaping of politics in New York City. TBC.
