= Clara Louise Payne =

Social worker and activist (1882–1958)

- Born: February 1882; Buffalo, New York
- Died: September 5, 1958 (aged 76); Buffalo, NY
- Occupations: Social worker and civic activist
- Parent(s): Thomas W. Payne and Grace L. Payne

Clara Louise Payne (1882–1958) was a prominent civic leader in Buffalo, New York. She was the first African American person to work in the Department of Public Welfare as a social worker, and was known for her active engagement to uplift her Black community.

== Biography ==
Clara Louise Payne was born in Buffalo, New York in February 1882 to parents Thomas W. and Grace L. Payne. Her father was an office clerk and her mother a matron at a school. She had two siblings, Madeline Payne Middleton and Dr. Earle Clifford Payne. Her family was well established in Buffalo, and she was considered as a member of the "social elite" clubs like the New Century, the Criterion, and the Appomattox.

She was a member of St. Philip's Episcopal Church, which her grandparents helped found.

=== Community organizations ===
Payne was extremely involved in the Buffalo community and she worked tirelessly for her community.

In 1901 during the Pan American Exposition, Payne was a member of the organizing committee for the Buffalo Progressive Club. They hosted a hospitality event for African Americans who attended the exposition.

In 1911, she was named co-head worker at the Social Center for Negros along with Susan Evans. The center offered mostly industrial and recreational programs, as well as some educational and cultural programs for adults.

Payne served at Marin Hospital as a volunteer nurse during World War I and the influenza epidemic of 1918 and 1920.

In April 1920, she was an organizer of a Leonard Wood Club for African American women in the Buffalo area, named for the Republican candidate for president. She was a member of the Buffalo chapter of NAACP and in 1920, was elected vice president.

She was a Girl Scout Troop Leader and started the first integrated YWCA in the area. In 1926, she was elected to the Board of Directors and was a member of the Y's Business Girls' Council and Inter-racial committee.

She was a founding member of the Buffalo Urban League and its board of directors. She was involved from 1927 until 1958.

=== Career ===
In 1905, Payne was employed as a domestic worker. In 1915, she was a caterer. She also held administrative roles in the NAACP and the National Urban League.

In June 1921, Payne began working as a Home Visitor for the Department of Public Welfare, and continued in this profession for 32 years as a social worker. She was the first African American to work in the social welfare department for Erie County.

=== Death and legacy ===
Payne died on September 5, 1958, at the age of 76.

== See also ==
- African-American women's suffrage movement
- Black suffrage in the United States
