= Elizabeth V. Colbert =

American politician

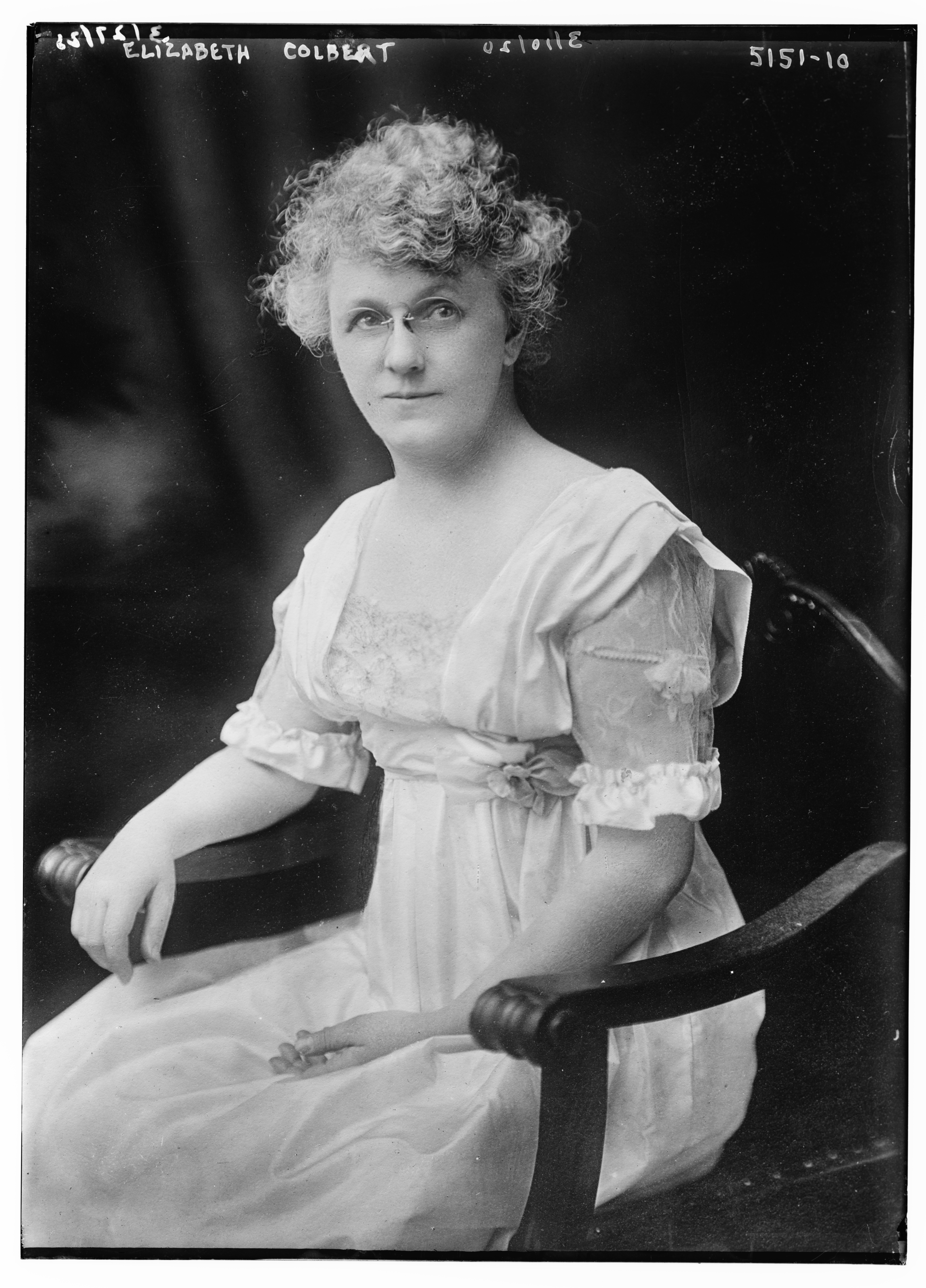
Colbert in 1915

Elizabeth V. Colbert (1865 – July 13, 1929) was an American politician from New York.

== Career ==
Elizabeth who was from Albany County, New York, was one of the founders of the first Equal Suffrage Club of Albany and served as an Assembly district leader in the New York State Woman Suffrage Party. Although unsuccessful, she was the first woman in Albany county to seek elective office, attempting to represent the county in the New York State Assembly.

Later, she was in charge of the Vital Statistics of the Albany Health Department under Mayor William Stormont Hackett. In March 1925, Gov. Al Smith appointed her to the State Motion Picture Censorship Commission, which led to a controversy between the "Governor and Republican leaders which ended when her appointed was finally accepted after the Governor had written a sharp message to the Senate charging a violation of constitutional principles in blocking the appointment." In 1927, then Secretary of State Robert Moses appointed her as chief clerk and Second Deputy Secretary of State of New York. After her death, Smith appointed Susan V. Ord of Albany to succeed her.

A prominent Democrat, she also served as vice-chairman of the Albany County Democratic organization. In 1920, she attended the Democratic National Convention in San Francisco, California. According to a May 1920 profile:

"A real asset of the woman political boss is the exact knowledge of her constituency. This Mrs. Colbert possesses, and she has besides a full measure of the ability of her sex to know intimate details without being told. Therefore she has aroused the admiration of fellow politicians by her foundation work. The women district leaders have been chosen from the rank and file of women voters and are women who have families and homes, with the interests of their communities at heart, and for these they are prepared to oppose any political shortsightedness in the way of schools and other domestic progress."

== Personal life ==
Elizabeth was the wife of Dr. Edward V. Colbert, a graduate of the Albany Academy and the Albany Medical College who was a coroners physician for several years. She was the mother of two sons, with whom she spent one month every summer hunting, fishing and “larking” in the Adirondacks. She was a member of St. Peter's Episcopal Church, Daughters of Rebecca and the Order of the Eastern Star.

After an attack of influenza that left her bedridden for four months, Colbert died in Albany, New York on July 13, 1929. Her husband died in March 1937.
