= Alice Riggs Hunt =

American suffragist, writer, journalist

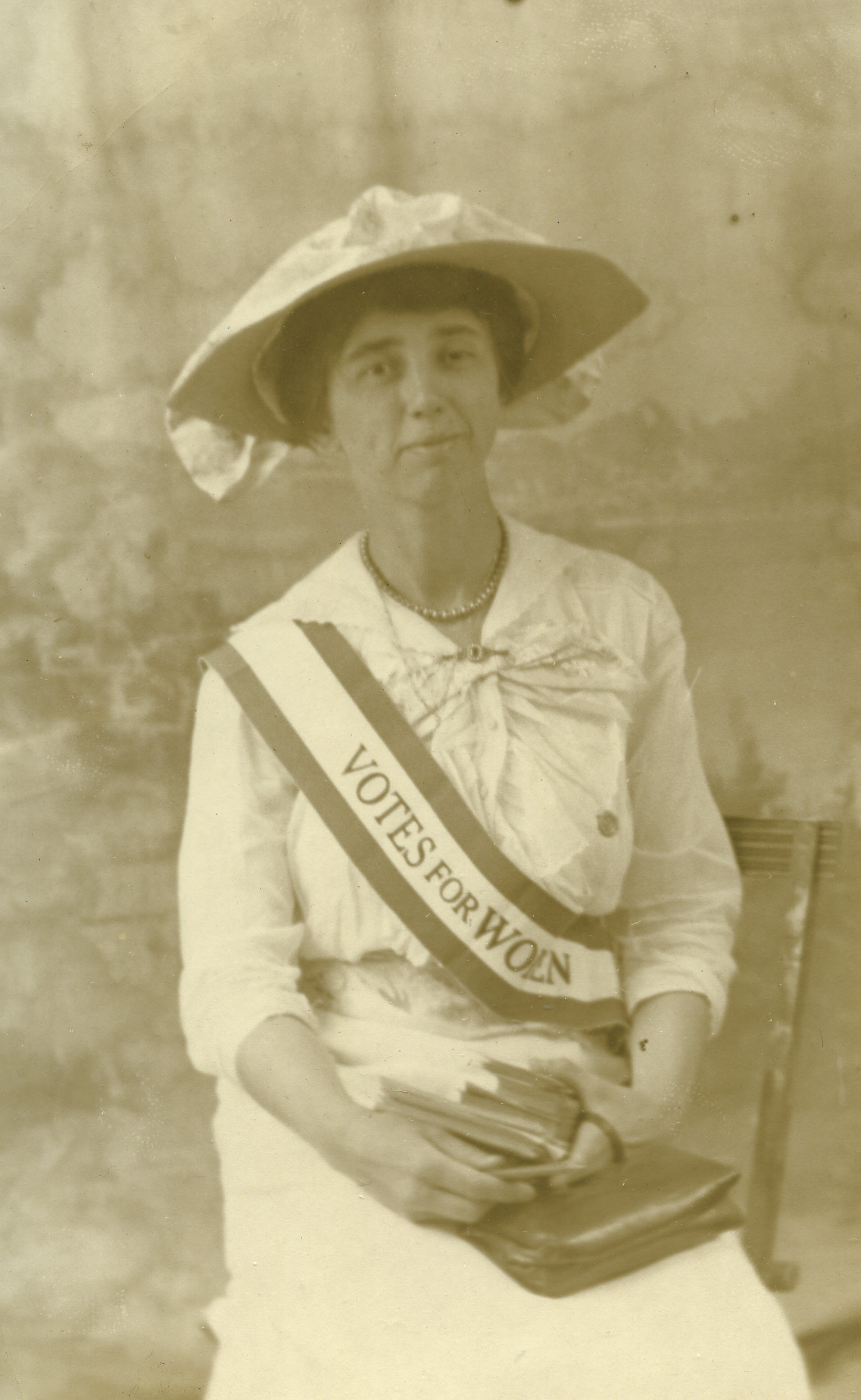
- Born: June 14, 1884; New York City
- Died: August 21, 1974, 90 years Calgary, Alberta, Canada
- Education: Columbia University; Drake University
- Occupations: Journalist, activist, writer

Alice Riggs Hunt (June 14, 1884 – August 21, 1974) was an American women's rights activist, journalist, writer, and speaker. In the United States, she was active as an organizer of women suffrage movements both New York and West Virginia though her activism extended internationally as she often attended conferences in Europe concerning women's suffrage and international peace.

== Early life and education ==
Riggs Hunt, the daughter of Mr. and Mrs. Charles Hunt, was born into an affluent family. Born on July 14, 1884, she was raised in New York City where her childhood consisted of private school study. Due to an eye condition from birth resulting in eye pain, her work was mainly done with tutors instead of in classes. From 1907 to 1908, she attended the School of Journalism at Columbia University, and later attended the Drake Business School.

== Career ==
Riggs Hunt spent 20 years with the Woman Suffrage Association of New York State, 10 of which were as a volunteer, from the early 1900s to the early 1920s. She had a successful career in journalism as a foreign correspondent for New York papers from 1909 to 1924, when she turned to other writing.

As a journalist, she contributed to the New York Evening Post, New York Tribune, New York Evening Mail, New York Call, London Daily Herald, La Vie Ouvriere (Paris), The Workers' Dreadnought, London, Bulletin of the Peoples, Council of America, and Bulletin of the American Woman Suffrage Association. She also worked as an international correspondent during the First World War, during which time Riggs Hunt covered the Versailles Treaty and the organization of the League of Nations. She frequently attended international events regarding the status of women, including the Third International Congress of Women in Vienna in July 1921 as a member of the Press Committee. Between October 1931 and October 1932, Riggs Hunt also published and edited the quarterly magazine Peniel. Focused on underscoring the value of face-to-face interaction as a form of societal betterment, the magazine's scope was dismissed by an anonymous author with the Fortnightly review as "hodge-podge of the new psychology and pantheism, designed for consumption by women's literary clubs."

Riggs Hunt was a speaker at many women's suffrage events, and participated in lecture tours concerning women's suffrage during her time with the Woman Suffrage Association of New York State. In the fall of 1917 she helped organized and spoke at a series of events in 13 West Virginian cities featuring Anna Howard Shaw regarding the vote for women. Riggs Hunt was also member of various organizations including the Colonial Dames of America, Order of Colonial Lords of Manors in America, and the Huguenot Society of New York.

== Published works ==
- Hunt, Alice Riggs (1919). Facts about communist Hungary, May, 1919. Workers' socialist federation.
- Hunt, Alice Riggs (1920). "Hungary Under Bela Kun". In Krupskaya, Nadezhda Konstantinovna (ed.). Adult education in Russia. Girard, Kan. : Appeal to Reason. pp. 27–47.
- Hunt, Alice Riggs (24 August 1921). "The Women's Peace Congress". The Nation. 113 (2929). New York, N.Y.: J.H. Richards: 200–201.
- Fruited Blossoms: a narrative poem, 1928
- Peniel, vol. 1 no. 1–4, 1931, & vol. 2 no. 1, 1932
- We, the Universe, 1934
- Three Horizons, 1944
