= Woman Suffrage Party =

City political organization based in New York

Woman Suffrage Party of New York
- Abbreviation: WSP
- Successor: League of Women Voters, New York chapter
- Formation: 1909
- Founder: Carrie Chapman Catt
- Dissolved: 1919
- Purpose: Women's suffrage in New York and the US

The Woman Suffrage Party (WSP) was a New York city political organization dedicated to women's suffrage. It was founded in New York by Carrie Chapman Catt at the Convention of Disfranchised Women in 1909. WSP called itself "a political union of existing equal suffrage organizations in the City of New York." WSP was many New York women's first experience with politics and "contributed directly to the passage of a woman suffrage amendment in New York state."

== History ==
The Woman Suffrage Party started with the Convention of Disfranchised Women. The Convention took place in Carnegie Hall on October 29, 1909, and was sponsored by the Interurban Suffrage Council (ISC). The ISC was a group created by Carrie Chapman Catt and made up of smaller suffrage organizations in New York City.

Local women's suffrage groups sent 804 delegates to attend. Mrs. Clarence Mackay presented the conference platform, which was adopted at the convention. Her platform included the assertion that men and women were equal, that it was natural for men and women to cooperate, that laws have tended to restrict women's access to education and full independence, and that it was unlawful to tax women when they had no voice in government.

The conference called for Catt to act as the chairperson for a new party, first called the Woman's Party, and later the Woman Suffrage Party. Overall, the conference was "conservative" in tone, rather than "militant," according to the News-Palladium. and The Los Angeles Times.

== About ==
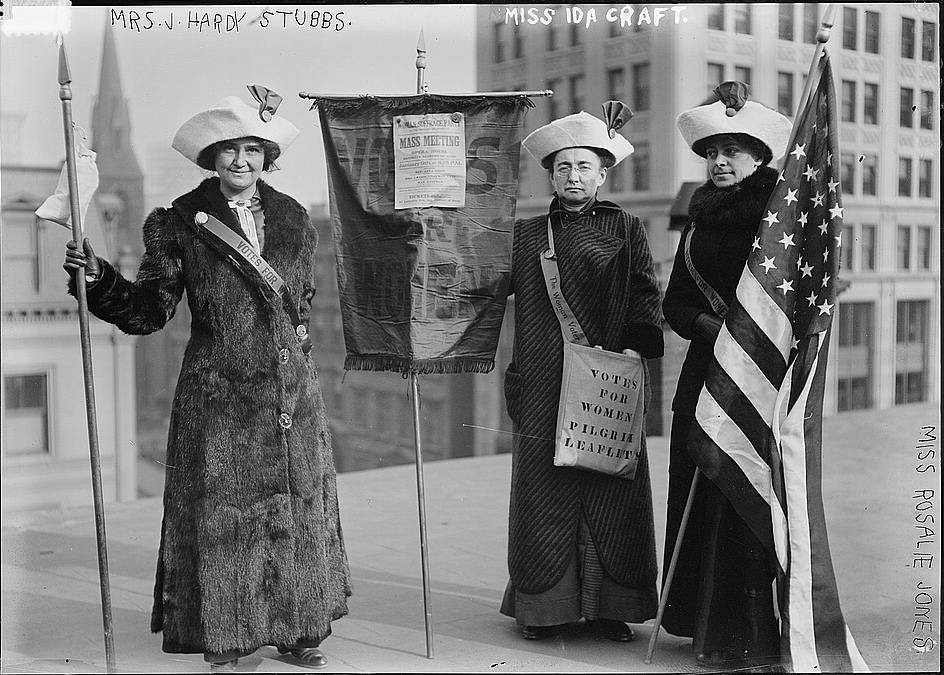
Rosalie Jones, with fellow suffragettes Jessie Stubbs and Ida Craft, handing out WSP meeting fliers, circa 1912-1913

Carrie Chapman Catt organized the WSP like a "political machine." The bottom level of the group included individual party members, who then chose district leaders who would represent them at borough and city conventions. The top level of WSP was a board of all of the district chairs. In total, there were 804 delegates and 200 alternates, making the WSP the "largest delegate suffrage body ever assembled in New York State."

In order to raise money for the group, WSP took in contributions from individuals, sponsored benefits and also created several "fund-raising stunts." These included "self-denial week" where members saved money by eating ten-cent sandwiches, walked instead of hiring cabs, and forwarded the savings to the WSP. "Sacrifice Day" on August 7, 1914, saw women attending a luncheon where they donated jewelry and watches to further the cause. WSP did not use violent tactics to achieve their goals.

Women in the WSP raised awareness by organizing large meetings, passing out suffrage-related literature and marched in parades. Parades included black women as well as white women, though in one parade on May 4, 1912, a black girl was mistreated by a group of men until "the division marshal beat them off with a flagpole." Members also went door to door throughout New York, spreading the word and encouraging men to sign petitions for women's right to vote. WSP also steadily applied pressure to "New York political machines to accept women's demands."

WSP was inclusive and "actively recruited working-class women." The organization was very interested in ensuring that women were paid fair wages in factories and that women had a say in government regulation of large industries. The WSP also advocated that women be paid the same as men for the same work. WSP also printed much of their literature in other languages, in order to reach minority groups, such as Italian, Jewish and Chinese women in New York. WSP also reached out to Catholic women by printing literature with testimonials from sympathetic Catholic clergy and also by joining with the St. Catherine's Welfare Society, which was pro-suffrage. While WSP did recruit working-class women and minorities, many members of WSP were firmly socially conservative and did not want to mix with the poor or with minorities.

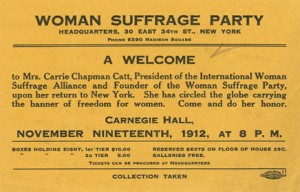
Flier distributed by the WSP to welcome Carrie Chapman Catt back to New York, November 1912

By 1915, the WSP had a hundred thousand members. During the summer of 1915, the WSP ran a "model woman suffrage campaign," with 5,225 outdoor meetings, 13 concerts and 28 parades and processions. Members continued to reach out door to door and by telephone. WSP sponsored a boat to run between Coney Island and Brighton Beach with a ten-foot sign urging people to support women's suffrage. When the vote for suffrage was not in their favor in November 1915, the WSP continued to lobby for another referendum for women's voting rights. By November 6, 1917, there was a resounding win for women's suffrage in New York. Catt called the New York campaign the "decisive battle of the American woman suffrage movement."

After women earned the right to vote in New York, the WSP helped women prepare to exercise their rights. Two committees were formed to help women prepare to vote: The Americanization Committee, under the direction of Mary E. Dreier, and the Women Voters' Council, under the leadership of Hay, which educated American voters. The Americanization Committee taught English classes to women who were born outside of the United States. They also visited tenements, aided in helping women achieve citizenship, and saw to educating entire families. The educational efforts of the WSP were completely non-partisan.

The WSP continued to lobby in the federal suffrage campaign until May 1919, when the WSP became the New York chapter of the League of Women Voters.

WSP published The Woman Voter as their official journal until 1917 when it merged with other publications to form The Woman Citizen.

== Notable members ==
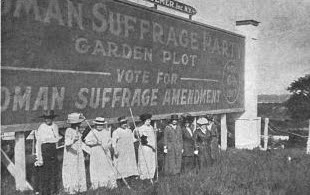
Model War Garden of the Woman Suffrage Party in New York. Pictured left to right are Rene Glogan, Helena Ries, Mrs. J.N. Dawson, Mrs. M. Barnes, Rose De Bella, Mrs. Daniel Appleton Palmer, Mrs. Thomas B. Wells, Mary Garrett Hay and Flora Hay.

Many members of WSP were notable women in the fight for women's suffrage. Mary Ritter Beard was the vice-chair of the Manhattan branch of the WSP in 1910. She left that post at about the same time she quit editing the official journal of WSP, The Woman Voter, in 1912. In 1915, Mary Garrett Hay was the president. In 1917, Helen Rogers Reid became the treasurer of the WSP. Vira Boarman Whitehouse was the head of the WSP in 1917 when women were given the right to vote in New York and Ida Reid Blair was the chair of the press publicity committee, working with prominent writers and artists to keep the issue in front of the public. The labor journalist Mary Heaton Vorse was a founding member, and in 1913 the party's delegate to the conference of the International Woman Suffrage Alliance in Budapest.

== See also ==
- List of New York suffragists
