= Catherine Mary Douge Williams =

African American suffragist and educator from Albany, New York)

- Born: c. 1832; Albany, New York
- Died: March 16, 1884; Albany, New York
- Spouse: 1. Henry Hicks (1852-1853) 2. Andrew Williams (1870-1884)
- Parent(s): Michael and Susan Douge

Catherine Mary Douge Williams (c. 1832-1884), also called Mary Williams or C. Mary Williams, was an African-American suffragist and educator who lived and worked in Albany, New York. She was the first Vice President of the Albany Woman's Suffrage Society, one of the first Black women to hold an officer role in a mixed club.

== Biography ==
Catherine Mary Douge was born to parents Michael and Susan Douge in Albany, New York in about 1832.

Her parents were leaders among the African-American community in Albany, a "'power couple' of African activists and anti-slavery abolitionists." They were members of organizations dedicated to improving the status of African-Americans. Michael Douge's father may have been part of the Haitian revolution. Michael Douge was a barber and a member of the Underground Railroad in Albany.

After Black male suffrage, he was part of Black Republican politics in Albany. In 1833, Susan Douge was co-founder and first president of the Albany Female Lundy Society. The Lundy Society was the first African-American women's charitable organization in Albany. They provided help to Black children so they could attend the "African School," also called the Albany School for Educating Children of Color, or early public schools.

Williams' childhood with parents as locally engaged influenced her later activities as a suffragist and activist.

Williams had three siblings: William Lloyd Garrison, Julia A., and John A. All attended Albany's District 8 school. Williams completed her education by age 15.

== Adult Life ==
On May 10, 1847, Williams became an assistant teacher at the Wilberforce School. Williams continued to teach intermittently at the school until 1860.

After the civil war, Williams traveled to Virginia and South Carolina to teach formerly enslaved adults and children. This was likely through the Freedmen's Bureau. Williams met her second husband in South Carolina, before returning to Albany in the early 1870's.

They lived in Albany's 8th Ward, then moved to the 11th Ward. By 1880, they lived with Williams's parents on Lark Street in the Arbor Hill neighborhood.

In 1880, New York State Legislature enacted law that allowed women to vote in school elections, the "School Suffrage" law.

Williams participated in suffrage activities during her time on Lark Street, by leading women of color to register to vote and spread the word. On April 14, 1880, Williams and her mother cast their first votes for school elections.

Williams was the Vice President of the Albany Woman's Suffrage Society for the 11th Ward. She remained in this position for at least two years. Her involvement as an officer shows that this organization was one of the few women's suffrage organizations that included women of color. Her position as part of a well-respected Black family in a neighborhood with the powerful and elite Black community in Albany gave her strategic importance in the suffrage fight. She enrolled at least six

In October 1881, Williams delivered an address at the statewide Woman Suffrage State Convention.

== Marriage and children ==
She married the Wilberforce school's principal, Henry Hicks, in 1852. Hicks and a first child died from illness.

By 1870, she returned to Albany and married Andrew Williams. In the early 1870's, they had a daughter, Susy (Susie).

== Death and afterward ==
Williams died on March 16, 1884, of phthisis or pulmonary tuberculosis, which she had contracted at least 20 years prior. She is buried at Albany Rural Cemetery in Albany County.

== See also ==
- African-American women's suffrage movement
- Black suffrage in the United States
