= Helen Gilbert Ecob =

American writer and suffragist

Helen Lathrop Gilbert Ecob (c.1850 – December 27, 1934) was an American writer and suffragist. Ecob was well known for her 1892 book on women's fashion reform, The Well-Dressed Woman: A Study in the Practical Application to Dress of the Laws of Health, Art, and Morals. She was involved in dress reform and women's suffrage throughout her life.

== Biography ==
Ecob was born in Gilbertsville, New York. She married a minister, James Henry Ecob, in the early 1870s. The Ecobs would have four children together. They moved to Albany, New York, in 1881 and then to Denver in 1893. The family moved to Philadelphia in September 1898 and then on to Flushing, New York, in 1907.

Ecob's husband died in New York on November 6, 1921. Ecob died on December 27, 1934, at her daughter's house in Suffern, New York. Their daughter Katherine G. Ecob became a noted psychologist and New York State official on mental hygiene issues.

== Work ==
Ecob was a well-known leader in the woman's suffrage movement, according to the Rockland County Journal News. In Denver, Ecob would see the effects of women's suffrage in Colorado. She was quoted on her opinion about suffrage for women in Colorado in The Blue Book, which was a compiled list of arguments for women's suffrage. In 1893, Ecob served on Dress Committee of the National Council of Women. Ecob was present for the final hearing on the women's suffrage amendment for the New York State Constitutional Convention in Albany, New York, and had spoken on the topic to the committees involved. In 1910, Ecob and her daughter, Frances, spoke at the Queens County Courthouse on matters relating to women's suffrage. Ecob was currently leading the Queens Equal Suffrage Movement while her daughter was the leader of the Flushing Suffragettes.

=== Writing ===
Ecob's 1892 book, The Well-Dressed Woman: A Study in the Practical Application to Dress of the Laws of Health, Art, and Morals, was written to reform the way women dressed and to promote their health and well-being. The book was also concerned with women's health in relation to what women wear. Ecob was very firm on the idea that corsets and tight items of underclothing were unhealthy. The Well-Dressed Woman also included diagrams and illustrations of more comfortable styles of dress for women.

Ecob also wrote essays for the magazine, The Congregationalist.
