= The Men's League =

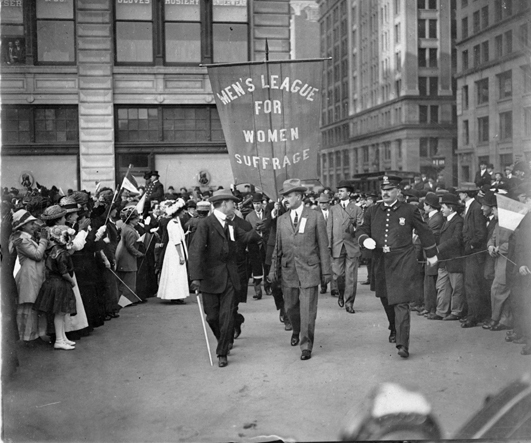
Men's League for Woman Suffrage in New York, 1915

The Men's League, made up of groups known variously as the Men's Equal Suffrage League, Men's League for Woman Suffrage, or National Men's League for Woman Suffrage, was an American men's women's suffrage organization formed by several suffragists in New York. The group was based on the idea of the British Men's League for Woman Suffrage. In the early 1900s, Oswald Garrison Villard and Anna Howard Shaw were in contact with one another regarding the creation of a group of prominent men to support women's suffrage efforts. Villard recruited Max Eastman and Stephen S. Wise to help with the project. Later, James Lees Laidlaw became the president and helped spread the concept of the group around the United States. Some colleges, like Harvard University and Swarthmore College, also had their own Men's League groups.

== History ==
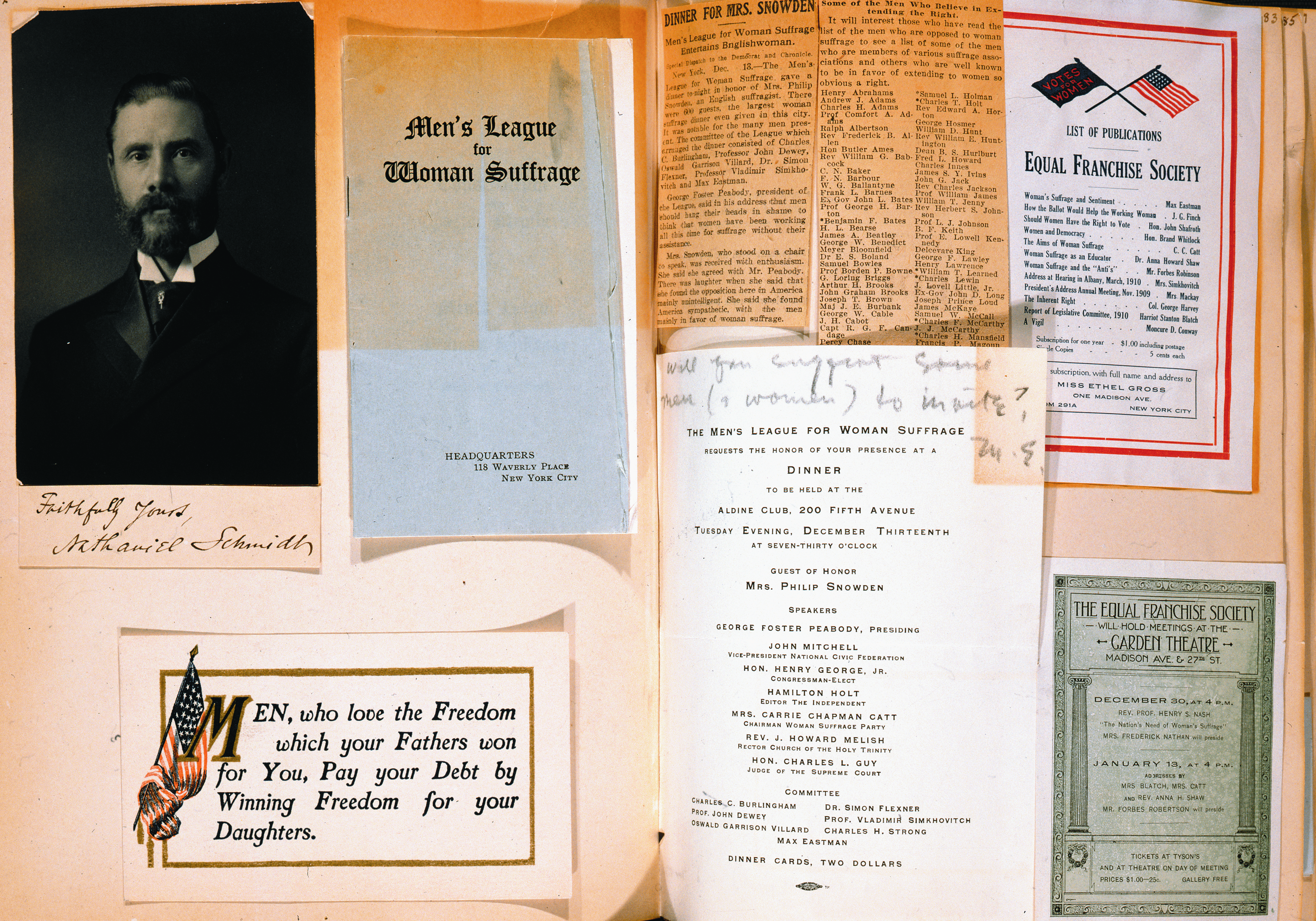
Men's League for Woman Suffrage, Miller Scrapbook

Fanny Garrison Villard had heard about the British group, the Men's League for Women's Suffrage, which was formed in 1907. The next year, she persuaded her son, Oswald Garrison Villard, to contact Anna Howard Shaw about creating a similar group in the United States. The men's leagues in Europe were starting to "gain ground." In 1908, the Nederlandsche Bond voor Vrouwenkiesrecht was formed in the Netherlands. There was also a Hungarian Men's League for Women's suffrage.

Shaw invited Villard to the New York state suffrage convention being held in Buffalo in October 1908. She felt that recruiting prominent men to the cause would add influence to the movement, though she didn't envision the men being involved in activism. By 1908, the idea for a men's equal suffrage group was being discussed by both Villard and Shaw.

Oswald Villard shared the idea with Stephen S. Wise and Max Eastman. Eastman, who had already discussed forming such a group, was interested. Eastman began recruiting members for the group in 1909. He started with a list of 12 men "of civic importance", and once he'd secured these members, it was easier to recruit others. The club remained secret, with Eastman wanting to keep things quiet until he had 100 members. The New York League was made public in November 1910. Eastman served as secretary for a year, and then the group in New York was taken over by Robert Cameron Beadle. George Foster Peabody was elected the first president in 1910. James Lees Laidlaw took over after Peabody and stayed on until 1916, when the national group was formed. Laidlaw was president of the national group until women's suffrage was passed.

Many of the new members of the League were influential men in their fields. Later, members such as George Creel and Dudley Field Malone had access to President Woodrow Wilson, whom suffragists were pressing to support women's suffrage. Malone resigned from his Wilson-appointed post over the issue of women's suffrage.

Other groups quickly began to form around the country. In Chicago, the first chapter of the Men's League for Woman Suffrage (also called the Chicago Men's Equal Suffrage League) was created in 1909. The New York Woman Suffrage Party officially recognized the New York Men's League in 1910 at their second annual convention. The NJ Men's League for Equal Suffrage was formed in 1910. The Men's Equal Suffrage League was founded in Cleveland in 1911. In California, the group was known as the California Political Equality League and headed by John Hyde Braly. All of the groups were affiliated with the National American Woman Suffrage Association (NAWSA). By 1912, the organization was estimated to have 20,000 members nationwide.

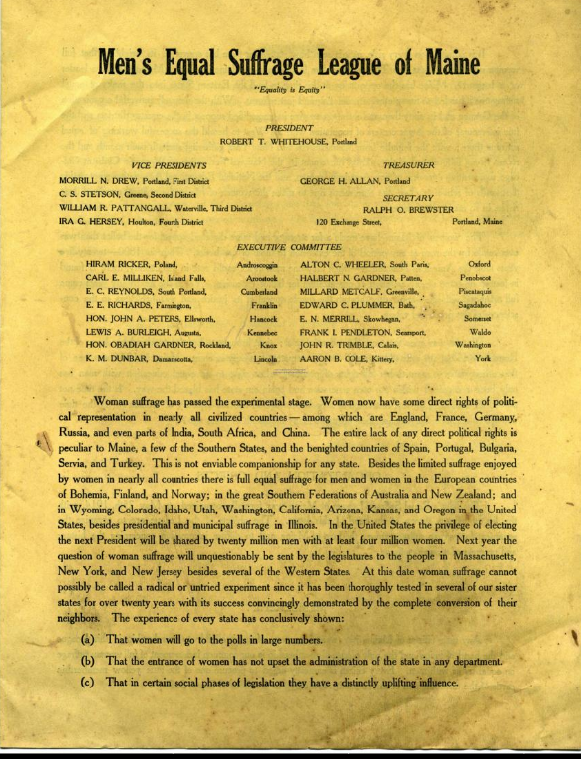
Men's Equal Suffrage League of Maine

Members of the League went around the country as speakers and were involved in fundraising. League groups organized meetings and also helped by working in voting booths. They also wrote editorials for women's suffrage. Men had access to political spheres that many of the women could not access. Laidlaw advocated that members wear blue buttons of courtesy, which were intended to show members of the public that suffrage and courtesy to women were compatible. The prominent names of the men helped to counter the idea that men who supported women's suffrage were un-masculine. Men in the League were able to steer the conversation about suffrage to equal justice, rather than focusing on gender roles.

Men marching in parades with the League at first had to deal with various types of abuse from bystanders. The first parade the New York League took part in was 1910. Laidlaw, Peabody and Villard led the parade of 87 men that year. At the 1912 suffrage parade in New York, female suffragists were inspired by the men marching. Some felt that it took more strength of character for the men to show public support of a women's issue. Others felt encouraged by seeing the men march with them. Francis Perkins said of Laidlaw marching with them, "I can never be thankful enough for the courage he gave to many of us – young and doubtful – when he took up the suffrage movement on his own." Laidlaw himself said that he marched to give "political support to the women and moral support to the men."

More groups were forming. Swarthmore College founded a Men's Equal Suffrage League. The Men's Equal Suffrage League of Virginia organized in 1912. Kansas also organized their League in 1912. In Portland, Oregon, the Men's Equal Suffrage Club was created in 1912. Pennsylvania started a Men's League for Women's Suffrage in March 1912. Laidlaw helped establish a Men's League for Woman Suffrage in Georgia in 1913. Orlando, Florida created a League in 1914 and the mayor, E. Frank Sperry served as the president. Another group was formed in Maine in 1914 with Robert Treat Whitehouse as president. Laidlaw went to Nevada and Montana to help set up Leagues in 1914. Massachusetts had Men's Leagues by 1910, including one at Harvard University. The Iowa Men's League for Equal Suffrage was formed in Des Moines in January 1916. Chapters formed in Cedar Rapids and Linn County, Iowa. Leagues in Kentucky and Louisiana were also created.

== Notable members ==
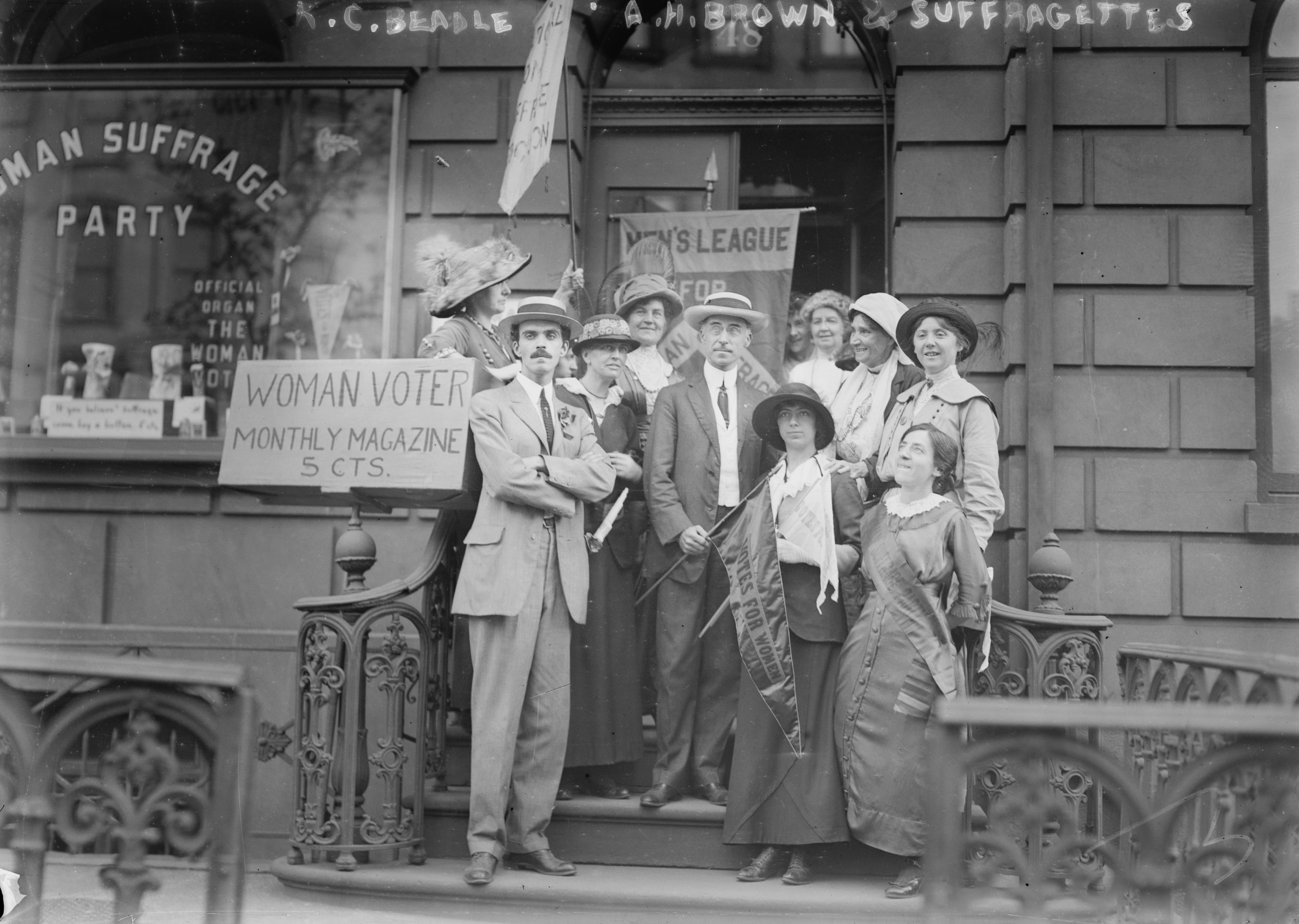
Members of the Men's League for Woman Suffrage in New York at the Woman's Suffrage Party of Manhattan headquarters

- Newton D. Baker (Ohio).
- Robert Cameron Beadle (New York).
- Charles Beard.
- Charles Culp Burlingham (New York).
- George Creel.
- William A. Delano.
- John Dewey.
- Max Eastman (New York).
- Simon Flexner.
- Hamilton Holt.
- William Ivins.
- Howard Kelly (Maryland).
- George Kirchwey.
- George Kunz.
- James Lees Laidlaw.
- Dudley Field Malone.
- George Middleton.
- Herbert Parsons (New York).
- George Foster Peabody.
- Amos Pinchot.
- Wellington D. Rankin (Montana).
- John Reed.
- Henry Rogers Seager.
- Vladimir Simkhovitch.
- E. Frank Sperry (Florida).
- Lincoln Steffens.
- Charles F. Thwing (Ohio).
- William P. Trent.
- Frank Vanderlip.
- Oswald Garrison Villard (New York).
- Harvey W. Wiley (Kentucky).
- Stephen S. Wise.
- Peter Witt (Ohio).

== See also ==
- Women's suffrage in the United States
