= Albert Bigelow =

American pacifist (1906–1993)

- Born: May 1, 1906
- Died: October 6, 1993 (aged 87); Walpole, Massachusetts
- Education: Harvard University; Massachusetts Institute of Technology
- Spouses: Josephine Rotch (m. 1929; died 1929) Sylvia Weld (m. 1931–1993)
- Children: 3
- Parent(s): Albert Francis Bigelow; Gladys Williams

Albert Smith Bigelow (May 1, 1906 – October 6, 1993) was an American pacifist and former United States Navy Commander, who came to prominence in the 1950s as the skipper of the Golden Rule, the first vessel to attempt disruption of a nuclear test in protest against nuclear weapons.

== Early life ==
Bigelow (1906–1993) was the son of Albert Francis Bigelow (1880–1958), and Gladys Williams. Albert's father was a partner in the Boston law firm Warren, Hogue & Bigelow from 1908 to 1914. His sister was Martha Bigelow, who married Theodore L. Eliot, the grandson of Charles William Eliot, president of Harvard.

Bigelow was a graduate of both Harvard University, in 1929, and the Massachusetts Institute of Technology with a degree in architecture. While at Harvard, he was a member of the Hasty Pudding Institute of 1770, Stylus, Iroquois and Fly Clubs, as well as a member of the Harvard hockey team.

== Navy Service ==
Bigelow served in the United States Navy during World War II, first as commander of a submarine chaser patrolling the Solomon Islands, and later as captain of the destroyer escort USS Dale W. Peterson On August 6, 1945, Bigelow was on the bridge of the Peterson as it sailed into Pearl Harbor, when he heard news of the explosion of the atomic bomb over Hiroshima. He resigned from the US Naval Reserve a month before becoming eligible for his pension.

== Involvement in peace movement ==
In 1948, Bigelow's wife, Sylvia, joined the Religious Society of Friends. Bigelow joined in 1955. It was through the Society of Friends that Albert and Sylvia came to house two of the Hiroshima Maidens: young Japanese women, severely disfigured by the effects of the atomic bomb, who were brought to the United States to undergo plastic surgery in 1955. Bigelow was humbled by the experience, in particular by his realization that the two young women "harbored no resentment against us or other Americans".

Bigelow became involved with the American Friends Service Committee in the mid-1950s, attempting to deliver a 17,411 signature petition, opposing atmospheric nuclear tests, to the White House via Maxwell M. Rabb, Cabinet Secretary. Repeated attempts to gain an appointment with Rabb were unsuccessful, leading Bigelow to conclude that other measures must be taken.

On August 6, 1957, on the 12th anniversary of the bombing of Hiroshima, Bigelow and twelve other members of the newly formed Committee for Non-Violent Action were arrested when they attempted to enter the Camp Mercury nuclear test site in Nevada, as part of a nonviolent vigil against the testing. The following day, they returned and sat with their backs towards the site as the nuclear test took place.

== Sailing The Golden Rule ==
In February, 1958, Bigelow set sail for the Eniwetok Proving Ground, the Atomic Energy Commission's atmospheric test site in the Marshall Islands, in the Golden Rule, a 30-foot (9 m) ketch. He was accompanied by crew members James Peck, George Willoughby, William R. Huntington, and Orion Sherwood. The voyage had been deliberately and widely publicized, and while the Golden Rule was en route to Hawaii, the Atomic Energy Commission hastily issued a regulation banning US citizens from sailing into the Proving Grounds.

When they arrived in Hawaii, the crew of the Golden Rule were issued a court summons, resulting in a temporary injunction against any attempt to sail to the test site. Bigelow chose to break the injunction on May 1, but the Golden Rule was intercepted by the US Coast Guard only 5 nautical miles (9 km) from Honolulu. A second attempt on June 4 was also unsuccessful – the crew were arrested, charged with contempt of court and sentenced to sixty days in jail.

But while the Golden Rule was docked in Honolulu, Bigelow and crew had met Earle and Barbara Reynolds. Earle L. Reynolds was an anthropologist who had visited Hiroshima to study the effects of the atomic bomb on Japanese society. Hearing of the plight of the Golden Rule, Earle and Barbara were inspired to take their own nonviolent action, and later that year their yacht, the Phoenix of Hiroshima became the first vessel to enter a nuclear test zone in protest when they sailed sixty-five nautical miles into the test area at Bikini Atoll. Earle was arrested and sentenced to six months in jail.

In 1959, Bigelow published a book, Voyage of the Golden Rule which documented his journey. Bigelow's story would go on to inspire fellow Quaker Marie Bohlen to suggest the use of a similar tactic to members of the Vancouver-based Don't Make a Wave Committee (later to become Greenpeace) in 1970.

Bigelow continued to take part in non-violent protests during the late 1950s and early 1960s, and was a participant in the Freedom Rides organized by the Congress on Racial Equality in 1961.

In his later years, from 1971 to 1975, he was a trustee to The Meeting School, a Quaker school in Rindge, New Hampshire.

== Personal life ==
Bigelow married his first wife, Josephine Rotch, the daughter of Arthur and Helen (née Ludington) Rotch, on June 21, 1929. She was a debutante of 1927 and was a member of the Junior League and Vincent Club of Boston. She, however, had resumed her affair with Harry Crosby within two months of their marriage, and then, on 10 December that year she and Crosby were found dead in an apparent murder suicide.

Two years later, Albert married Sylvia Weld, daughter of Rudolph and Sylvia Caroline (née Parsons) Weld, on September 10, 1931. Sylvia was a granddaughter of Gen. William Barclay Parsons (1859–1932), the chief engineer of New York's first subway. Her great-grandparents were William Barclay Parsons (1828–1887) and Eliza (née Livingston) Parsons. Together, they had three daughters, Lisa, Kate, and Mary, their youngest, who died when she was seven months old.

Bigelow died, aged 87, at a nursing home in Walpole, Massachusetts in 1993.

== See also ==
- List of peace activists
