= Sammis =

Sammis is a given and surname derived from Samways, which originated in Dorset, England. Richard Samways was a probable passenger of the Mary and John in 1630, who settled in Windsor, Connecticut and the spelling of the name subsequently changed to Sammis.

== Notable people with the given name Sammis ==
- Sammis Reyes

== Notable people with the surname Sammis ==
- Ida Sammis
- John H. Sammis
- John Merritt Sammis
- Minnetta Sammis Leonard
