= John Sammis =

John Sammis may refer to:

- John H. Sammis (1846–1919), Christian hymn composer, composed "Trust and Obey"
- John Merritt Sammis (1820–1909), business figure in Oyster Bay, New York and a friend of Theodore Roosevelt
