= Committee for Non-Violent Action =

American anti-war group

The Committee for Non-Violent Action (CNVA) was an American anti-war group, formed in 1957 to resist the US government's program of nuclear weapons testing. It was one of the first organizations to employ nonviolent direct action to protest against the nuclear arms race.

The CNVA's immediate antecedent, a committee known as Non-Violent Action Against Nuclear Weapons, was formed by radical Quaker Lawrence Scott. Other leaders of the CNVA included A.J. Muste, Albert Bigelow, Bayard Rustin and George Willoughby.

== History ==
In August 1957, members of the CNVA were arrested when they attempted to enter the Camp Mercury nuclear testing grounds near Las Vegas, Nevada. In February 1958, Albert Bigelow and the crew of the Golden Rule were intercepted by the US Coast Guard five nautical miles (9 km) from Honolulu, Hawaii, as they attempted to sail their vessel into the Eniwetok Proving Grounds, the US test site in the Marshall Islands. Two further attempts to defy a hastily enacted regulation banning US citizens from sailing to the test site led to the arrest and 60-day imprisonment of the crew.

The voyage of the Golden Rule inspired anthropologist Earle L. Reynolds and his family to undertake a similar journey, and on 1 July 1958, their yacht, Phoenix of Hiroshima, entered the test zone at Bikini Atoll. The Phoenix penetrated 65 nautical miles (120 km) into the test area before the vessel was boarded by the Coast Guard and ordered to sail to Kwajalein atoll, where Reynolds was charged with violating the Atomic Energy Commission's new regulation.

In 1958, a CNVA group from Philadelphia travelled to Cheyenne, Wyoming, to raise consciousness and to convince locals to oppose the construction of Atlas missile sites at Francis E. Warren Air Force Base.

In 1959, CNVA sponsored protests at the construction site of an intercontinental ballistic missile near Omaha, Nebraska. Around 15 protestors, including A.J. Muste and Karl H. Meyer, the son of Vermont Senator William Meyer, were arrested and handcuffed as they climbed the fence to invade the site. They were each sentenced to six months in jail. In 1960, the group co-ordinated nonviolent protests against construction of the nuclear weapons equipped Polaris submarine in New London, Connecticut.

During the early 1960s, the CNVA organised two 'Walks for Peace', including a 6,000-mile (9,700 km) march from San Francisco to Moscow, during which the walkers called on the governments of the world to disarm. During a Walk for Peace from Quebec to Cuba, via Washington, D.C., walkers were attacked and jailed as black and white activists walked together through Macon, Georgia. Both walks were led by peace activist Bradford Lyttle.

In 1962, the Cambridge Nonviolent Action Committee (CNAC) on the Eastern shore of Maryland led protests in their city that led to the declaration of Martial Law. On July 23, the Kennedy Administration intervened, negotiating an agreement with the city for, among other things, the complete desegregation of public schools and public accommodations.

In the mid-1960s, CNVA began to focus on the Vietnam War. Activists traveled to Hanoi in Vietnam and picketed the US embassy, and the CNVA advocated tax refusal as a method of resistance.

In 1968, after the 1967 death of leader A.J. Muste, the CNVA merged with the pacifist War Resisters League.

== Legacy ==
While never a mass-membership organization, the CNVA's pioneering use of nonviolent direct action would have a significant influence on movements to follow. In particular, it was the example set by the voyages of the Golden Rule and the Phoenix that would inspire the first Greenpeace activists to use similar methods in their campaigns to halt nuclear testing at the island of Amchitka, Alaska, and at Muraroa Atoll in the Pacific.

== See also ==
- Civil disobedience
- List of anti-war organizations
- List of peace activists
- Nonviolence
- Committee for a Sane Nuclear Policy (SANE, Inc.)
- Timeline of riots and civil unrest in Omaha, Nebraska
