= Minnetta Sammis Leonard =

American educator

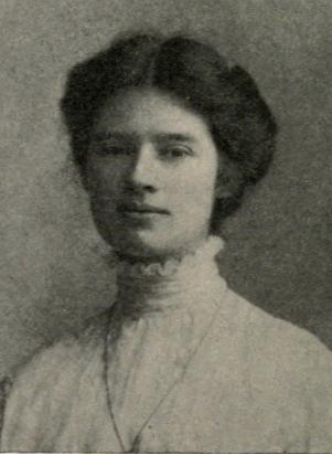
- Minnetta Sammis (later Leonard), from the 1906 yearbook of Teachers College, Columbia University
- Born: Minnetta Florence Sammis; 1879; Indiana
- Died: October 15, 1960; Madison, Wisconsin
- Children: Barbara Leonard Reynolds
- Relatives: Earle L. Reynolds (son-in-law); John H. Sammis (uncle)

Minnetta Sammis Leonard (1879 – October 15, 1960) was an American educator, and editor of The Home Educator (1923), a parenting manual.

== Early life and education ==
Sammis was born in Indiana, the daughter of David Sturges Sprague Sammis and Adelaide F. Hall Sammis. Hymn writer John H. Sammis was her uncle. She graduated from Teachers College, Columbia University in 1906.

== Career ==
After college, Sammis was Supervisor of Kindergarten Work in the Oglethorpe School at Atlanta University. Leonard taught kindergarten education courses at the Milwaukee State Normal School. She was president of the Wisconsin Kindergarten Association. She served on the advisory board of Parents' Magazine, and on the editorial board of The Home Kindergarten Manual (1921).

Leonard spoke about her work to community groups, including the American Association of University Women. In 1940, she was director of a kindergarten program in Madison, Wisconsin. She visited Indonesia and Japan in 1956 and Hawaii in 1958, while her daughter was abroad. She was active in the Woman's Club of Madison, and the Women's International League for Peace and Freedom. In her last years, she cared for her grandson Ted Reynolds when he was a student in Madison.

== Publications ==
- "The Kindergarten as a Socializing Agency" (1912)
- The Home Educator: The Foundation Library (1923, editor, with Patty Smith Hill)
- "The Wisconsin Kindergarten Association" (1925)
- Best Toys for Children and Their Selection (1925)
- "Buying the Gift to Fit the Child" (1926)
- "A Call on Santa Claus" (1926)
- *Buying Toys with an Eye to the Future"
- "Toys for Travelers and Stay-at-Homes" (1929)

== Personal life ==
Sammis married English professor Sterling Andrus Leonard in 1913. They had a daughter, Barbara Leonard Reynolds, who became a noted peace activist with her husband, Earle L. Reynolds. Sterling Leonard drowned while canoeing with I. A. Richards on Lake Mendota in 1931. She died in 1960, in Madison, at the age of 86.
