= Barbara Leonard =

Barbara Leonard may refer to:

- Barbara Leonard (politician)
- Barbara Leonard (actress)
- Barbara Leonard Reynolds, née Leonard, American author
