= Lillian Willoughby =

American peace activist (1915–2009)

Lillian Ruth Pemberton Willoughby (January 29, 1915 – January 15, 2009) was an American Quaker activist who advocated for world peace, founded Take Back the Night, and conducted nonviolent protests against war and preparations for war for nearly 70 years.

== Biography ==
Willoughby was born and raised in West Branch, Iowa, the daughter of farmer Verlin Luther Pemberton and Sara Margaret Hinshaw. She attended a Quaker boarding school and later graduated from the University of Iowa. Willoughby became a dietician, working in hospitals and nursing homes.

She met her husband, George Willoughby, in Iowa. He was a conscientious objector during World War II and helped find homes for Japanese-Americans who had been put in camps at the outbreak of the war.

From 1971 to 1987, the Willoughbys were central to a group of 20 houses practicing communal living in West Philadelphia, called "The Life Center," devoted to helping the community. The Life Center was home to, and supported the activities of the Philadelphia branch of Movement for a New Society. The Willoughbys lived in a small, third-floor apartment where they practiced living simply. When a Philadelphia Daily News reporter encountered them there in June 1980, they were baking their own bread. The group started the first Take Back the Night rally, an idea that became an annual anti-crime event across the country.

They later lived on the Old Pine Farm Land Trust in Deptford Township, Gloucester County, New Jersey, part of the New Jersey Green Acres program.

Taking on the simple life was also a way to keep any income away from the federal government. Even so, the IRS confiscated their red Volkswagen for back taxes. During the auction at the IRS headquarters in Chester in 1970, the Willoughbys and supporters served lemonade in the hallway before submitting the winning bid of $900 to buy the car back.

In 2003, Willoughby and other demonstrators had their heads shaved outside the Liberty Bell in the name of peace. They intended to send the shorn hair to senators from Pennsylvania and New Jersey to express their opposition to the war.

In 2004, she and other activists spent seven days in the federal detention center in Philadelphia for blocking the entrance to the Federal Building in a protest against the Iraq war. They chose jail over $250 fines.

In a statement read in court, she summed up her philosophy:

"I am approaching my 90th year… I had high hopes of leaving this earth confident that the people on it knew more about nonviolence and conflict resolution.… Even after 9/11 we had a window of opportunity to do just that. By working with the United Nations and the World Court we could have helped build a stronger world community, a community of fairness and justice for all, where compassion, understanding, forgiveness, imagination, sharing and courage are valued and practiced."

In 2006, Willoughby and other older activists, including the poet Sonia Sanchez, were charged with defiant trespass for refusing to leave a Center City military recruiting station after trying to enlist to serve in Iraq. They called themselves the Granny Peace Brigade. A judge dismissed the charges.

Willoughby died on January 15, 2009, survived by her husband (who died a year later), three daughters, Sally Willowbee, Anita, and Sharon Willoughby, a son, Alan Willoughby, and three grandchildren.
