= Earle L. Reynolds =

Anti-nuclear weapons activist

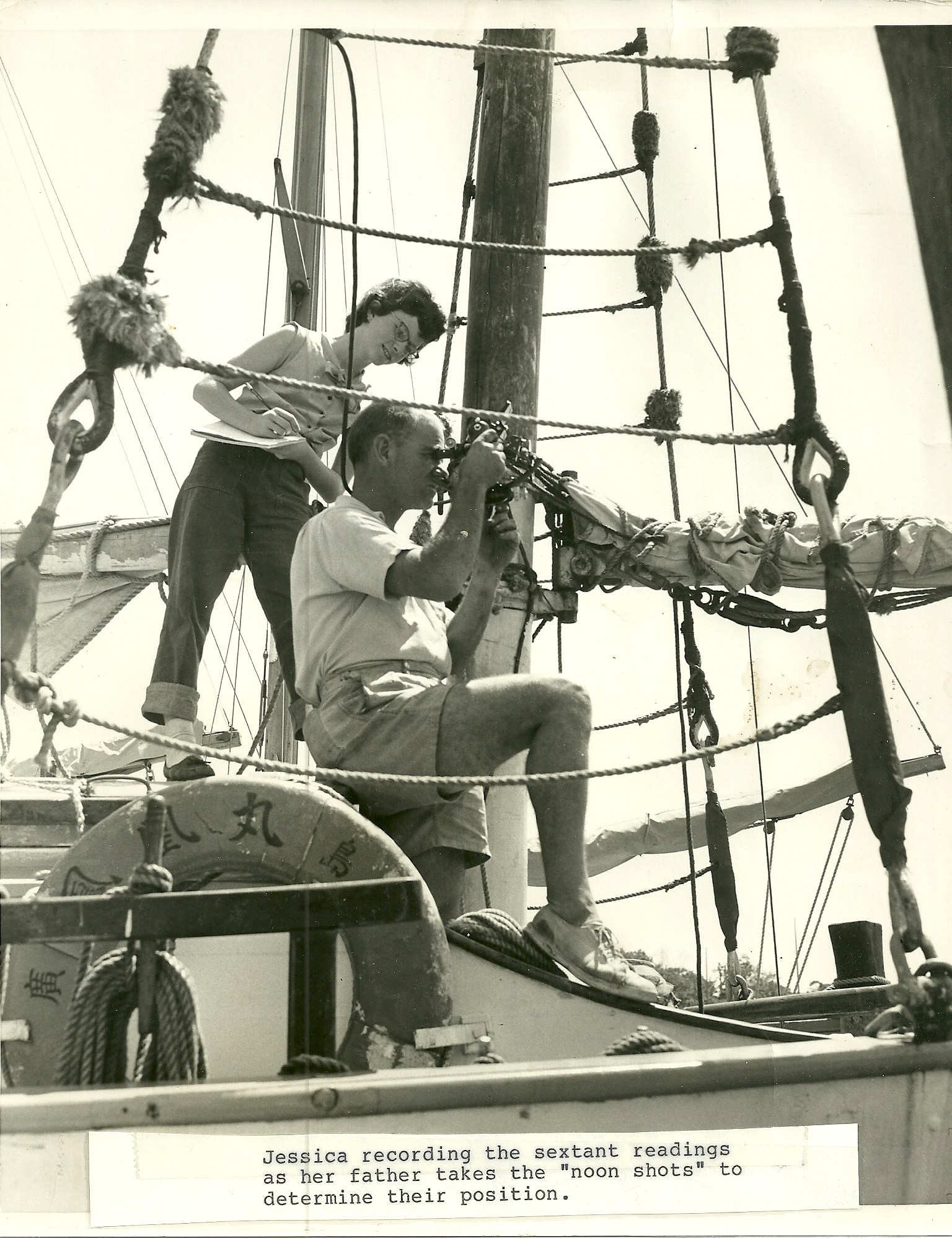
Reynolds and daughter Jessica take sextant readings, c. 1958.

Earle L. Reynolds (born Earl Frederick Schoene; October 18, 1910 – January 11, 1998) was an anthropologist, educator, author, Quaker, and peace activist. He was sent to Hiroshima by the Atomic Energy Commission in 1951 to study the effects of the first atomic bomb on the growth and development of exposed children. His professional discoveries concerning the dangers of radiation later moved Reynolds into a life of anti-nuclear activism. In 1958 he sailed with his wife Barbara, two of his three children and a Japanese yachtsman in the Phoenix of Hiroshima, a ketch he had designed himself, into the American nuclear testing zone in the Pacific. In 1961 the family sailed to the USSR to protest Soviet nuclear testing. During the Vietnam War Reynolds and his second wife, Akie sailed the Phoenix to Haiphong to deliver humanitarian and medical aid to victims of American bombing.

== Early life ==
Reynolds, an only child, was born Earl Frederick Schoene to William and Maude Schoene as the circus of which they were a part passed through Des Moines, Iowa. Earle's father and uncle Frederick performed as The Landry Brothers, trapeze artists and tightrope walkers for the John T. Wortham Shows (also known as John T. Wortham Carnival). Billboard noted, "The Landry Brothers work a neat and classy rope acrobatic turn for six minutes, in full stage, which brought the brawny lads one legit.". Before World War I made German names unpopular, according to Reynolds, the pair were billed as Schoene Brothers Aerial Artists. Depending on the season and the family's financial status, their circus acts alternated with vaudeville.

Earl took his stepfather's surname, added an "e" to his first name, earned the rank of Eagle Scout and graduated from Vicksburg High School in 1927. He went on to earn his BA and MA from the University of Chicago and his Ph.D. from the University of Wisconsin, all in Anthropology. He married Barbara Leonard in 1936 and they had three children: Tim (1936), Ted (1938), and Jessica (1944). From 1943 to 1951 Reynolds was Associate Professor of Anthropology at Antioch College and Chairman of the Physical Growth Department at the Fels Research Institute for the Study of Human Development, also at Antioch College.

== Career ==
In 1951, Earle joined the Atomic Bomb Casualty Commission (ABCC), established under the direction of the National Research Council's Division of Medical Sciences in March 1947. He was sent to Hiroshima to research the effects of radiation from the first atomic bomb on the growth of Japanese children. From 1951 until 1954, Earle completed the first of a series of longitudinal studies meant to be resumed after a one-year sabbatical. He wrote up his findings as "Report on a Three-Year Study, 1951-2-3, of the Growth and Development of Hiroshima Children Exposed to the Atomic Bomb, 1954." In summary he had found children exposed to radiation to be smaller than their counterparts with lowered resistance to disease and a greater susceptibility to cancer, especially leukemia. Because strontium-90 (produced by the atomic bomb) seeks the same areas of the bodies of growing children as calcium, such as the thyroid gland, children exposed to the bomb were also subject to thyroid cancer.

The Phoenix of Hiroshima (foreground) in Hong Kong Harbor, en route to North Vietnam, 1967.

While in Japan, Reynolds designed and had built a yacht of 50 feet (15 m), the Phoenix of Hiroshima. From 1954 to 1958, he, his wife Barbara, son Ted (16), daughter Jessica (10), and three young Japanese men from Hiroshima, Niichi ("Nick") Mikami, Motosada ("Moto") Fushima and Mitsugi ("Mickey") Suemitsu, sailed around the world.

The building of the boat took 18 months, one year longer than had been previously expected. The first leg of the voyage, from Japan to Hawaii, took 48 days.

In Honolulu for the second time, what had been a pleasure cruise took a serious turn. Across the dock from the Phoenix was a ketch of 30 feet (9 m), the Golden Rule. Its crew, four Quaker pacifists, Albert Bigelow, George Willoughby, Bill Huntington and Orion Sherwood were attempting to sail to the Marshall Islands to protest the United States' testing of 35 nuclear devices there. An injunction against American citizens entering the test zone was passed after the Golden Rule left port and it was brought back by the Coast Guard. Impressed by the reasoning and character of these men, Earle and Barbara joined the Society of Friends (Quakers) and considered taking over their protest in the Phoenix.

Reynolds was at that time one of the world's experts on the effects of radiation. In determining whether to deliberately enter the test zone, he considered a number of factors, such as the effects the radiation from the series of nuclear tests would have on the world environment, specifically increasing incidents of cancer, and the effects of this additional radiation on the Hiroshima and Nagasaki population, since both wind and ocean currents from the test site would carry radiation that direction. He considered unconstitutional the United States government's injunction declaring 390,000 square miles (1,000,000 km^{2}) of ocean off-limits to American personnel during the series. Also, the forbidden zone blanketed any route by which the Reynolds family could conveniently sail back to Japan, as they had hoped to do as soon as possible to complete the circumnavigation. In addition, as the Marshall Islands were a Trust Territory of the U.S., Reynolds objected to the forced removal of Marshallese from their home islands for the purpose of detonating weapons which would almost certainly render their islands uninhabitable for years to come.

== Activism ==
Earle, Barbara, Ted (20), Jessica (14) and Mikami cleared "for the high seas" on June 11, 1958. The family had not decided whether or not to enter the forbidden zone but Mikami, whose mother and brother had been in the bombing, never wrestled with the question. For days after the nuclear weapon was dropped, his mother had crawled through the radioactive rubble, searching for her brother-in-law. She never found his body.

By July 1, at the edge of the invisible perimeter of the zone, everyone came to a consensus. Earle announced by radiotelephone, on the international frequency for ships at sea, "The United States yacht Phoenix is sailing today into the nuclear test zone as a protest against nuclear testing..."

The next morning, 65 nautical miles (120 km) inside the forbidden zone, the Phoenix was intercepted and stopped by the American Coast Guard cutter Planetree on July 2, 1958. Two armed Coast Guard officers jumped aboard and put Reynolds under arrest. He was flown back to Honolulu for trial. A jury convicted him of entering a forbidden area. The sentence was overturned on appeal.

Within 19 months Earle and his family were involved in another protest voyage. With the Pacific Ocean again open to American citizens, they sailed without incident back to Hiroshima.

In October 1961, the USSR resumed its own nuclear testing. The Reynolds family plus Tom Yoneda sailed to Nakhodka in protest (The nearest military port, Vladivostok, was inaccessible in winter).

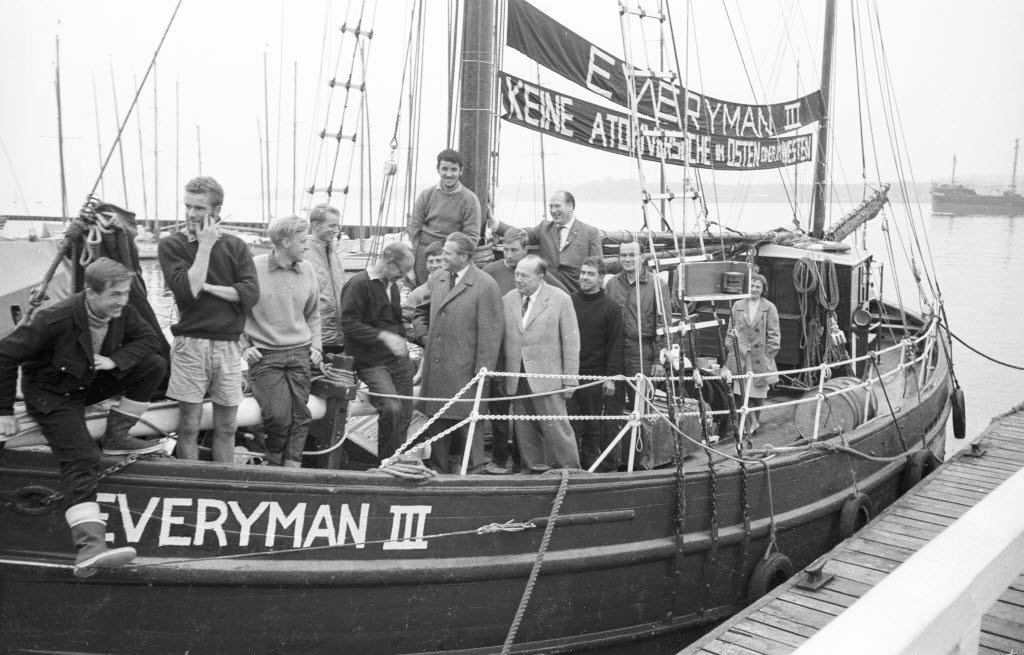
Everyman III in Kiel 1962

In 1962, Reynolds was invited to captain the Everyman III, on which members of A Quaker Action Group (AQAG) sailed from London to Leningrad via Belgium, the Netherlands, Germany, Denmark, and Sweden. This boat of 48 feet (15 m), too, was stopped at sea by armed soldiers. This time the crew were tied up with ropes. That same year, Reynolds and Professor Tatsuo Morito of the Hiroshima University co-founded the Hiroshima Institute of Peace Science (HIPS). Reynolds became a spokesman for the Japanese peace movement and attempted to work with its Gensuikyo branch until he found it too political for his taste, reporting to the press, "Peace cannot be achieved in an atmosphere of hatred."

Earle and Barbara divorced in 1964 and Earle married Akie Nagami, a citizen of Hiroshima and a graduate of Hiroshima Women's College where Earle was guest Professor of Anthropology. Together Earle and Akie continued his voyages in the Phoenix. In 1967 a multi-national crew delivered nearly a ton of medical aid to the Red Cross Society of North Vietnam for civilian victims of the Vietnam War. They spent eight days visiting hospitals in Hanoi and Hai Phong and observing the effects of American bombing on outlying villages. Two other voyages to Vietnam followed.

Earle and Akie made two attempts to sail the Phoenix to Shanghai as a gesture of "friendship and reconciliation" from an American and a Japanese citizen to the people of China, although the Japanese government refused to grant Akie a passport on the grounds China and Japan had no diplomatic relations. In 1968 the Phoenix was stopped on the high seas by a Japanese ship. Two years of litigation followed in Japanese courts. In 1969, with a crew of six Americans, the Phoenix was stopped 20 nautical miles (37 km) offshore by Chinese authorities and their entry was prohibited.

After these attempts to sail to China, the Japanese government passed a new immigration law cracking down on "undesirable aliens" (1970) and Reynolds was expelled from his adopted country of 13 years. He and his wife sailed to San Francisco and settled in Ben Lomond, California. He taught Peace Studies at the University of California, Santa Cruz and at Cabrillo College while Akie earned an MA in Peace Studies from Antioch College and worked as a career counselor at UCSC, specializing in peace-making careers and in placing students in overseas jobs. His seminar class founded the Peace Resource Center at Merrill College on the UCSC campus in 1975 but it became a casualty of financial cutbacks in the 1980s. Over a two-week period in 1981, 1900 activists were arrested at Diablo Canyon Power Plant. It was the largest arrest in the history of the U.S. anti-nuclear movement and against nuclear weapons research. Reynolds was one of those arrested.

In a 1986 interview, Earle commented on his life work: "I've been a kind of a renegade scientist. As soon as I stepped over the boundaries, as soon as my findings became politically sensitive, I lost my credibility as a scientist. Now a scientist will stand on a podium and say what I was saying 30 years ago. I'm like a voice in the wilderness that finally begins to hear answering voices."

== Bibliography ==
- Growth and Development of Hiroshima Children Exposed to the Atomic Bomb. Three Year Study (1951-3). Atomic Bomb Casualty Commission Technical Report 20-59, 1959. Cited in Joseph L. Belsky and William J. Blot, Adult Stature in Relation to Childhood Exposure to the Atomic Bombs of Hiroshima and Nagasaki.
- Penny Arcade (unpublished memoir) n.d., in Earle and Akie Reynolds Collection, UCSC: www.oac.cdlib.org/data/13030/99/tf6q2nb599/files/tf6q2nb599.pdf (See note by Reynolds' daughter above)
- with Barbara Reynolds, All in the Same Boat. New York: David McKay Company, Inc., 1962 Family's trip around the world in the Phoenix, 1954-60.
- "The Forbidden Voyage," The Nation, 15 November 1958
- The Forbidden Voyage. New York: David McKay Company, Inc., 1961. Non-fiction. The Reynolds family's protest voyage against American nuclear testing in the Pacific and aftermath, 1958-1960.

=== Scholarly Articles by Reynolds (chronological) ===
- Sontag, Lester Warren; Reynolds, Earle L. Ossification Sequences in Identical Triplets: A Longitudinal Study of Resemblances and Differences in the Ossification Patterns of a Set of Monozygotic Triplets (1944)
- Sontag, Lester W., M.D. and Reynolds, Earle L., Ph.D. The fels composite sheet. I: A practical method for analyzing growth progress J. Pediat. 26, p. 327 (1945)
- Sontag, Lester W., M.D. and Reynolds, Earle L., Ph.D. The fels composite sheet. II: Variations in growth patterns in health and disease J. Pediat. 26:4, pp. 336–354 (1945)
- Reynolds, Earle L. Sexual Maturation and the Growth of Fat, Muscle and Bone in Girls (1946)
- Reynolds, Earle L. and Schoen, Grace. Growth Patterns of Identical Triplets from 8 through 18 Years (1947)
- Reynolds, Earle L. and Clark, Leland C. Creatinine Excretion, Growth Progress and Body Structure in Normal Children (1947)
- Reynolds, Earle L. Distribution of Tissue Components in the Female Leg From Birth to Maturity The Fels Research Institute for the Study of Human Development, Antioch College, Yellow Springs, Ohio The Anatomical Record (1947 or 1948)
- Reynolds, Earle L., The appearance of adult patterns of body hair in man Department of Anthropology, Antioch College, and Physical Growth Department, Fels Research Institute for the Study of Human Development, Antioch College, Yellow Springs, Ohio The American Journal of Physical Anthropology (date?)
- Reynolds, Earle L. Degree of kinship and pattern of ossification: A longitudinal X-ray Study of the Appearance Pattern of Ossification Centers in Children of Different Kinship Groups The Samuel S. Fels Research Institute, Antioch College, Yellow Springs, Ohio The American Journal of Physical Anthropology (date?)
- Reynolds, Earle L., Toshiko Asakawa. The measurement of obesity in childhood. The Fels Research Institute for the Study of Human Development, Antioch College, Yellow Springs, Ohio The American Journal of Physical Anthropology (1948)
- Reynolds, Earle L., Ph.D., and Wines, Janet V., A.B. Individual Differences in Physical Changes Associated with Adolescence in Girls. Am J. Dis. Child. 75 (3):329-350 (March 1948)
- Steinberg, Arthur G.; Reynolds, Earle L. Further Data on Symphalangism. 1948
- Earle Reynolds cited in Harpenden Growth Study: J.M. Tanner. "Long-term longitudinal study of the growth of children in Harpenden. . . There was an excellent normative study before, made by Earle Reynolds and Janet Wines at the Fels Research Institute, who took their descriptions from the German literature of the 1930s and earlier, and excellent studies since, both in Zurich and in Stockholm, but ours was the only one in the period 1950-1980." (1948)
- Reynolds, Earle L. Anthropology and Human Growth. The Ohio Journal of Science, Vol. XLIX, No. 3 (May, 1949) From a speech given at the 57th Annual Meeting of the Ohio Academy of Science, University of Toledo, May 7, 1948.
- Reynolds, E.L., and Wines, J.V. Physical Changes Associated with Adolescence in Boys, Am. J. Dis. Child. 82 (5):529-547 (Nov. 1951)
- Reynolds and Wines, cited in Garn, Stanley Marion. Changes in Areolar Size during the Steroid Growth Phase. In Child Development, Vol. 23, No. 1 (March, 1952)
- Earle Reynolds cited in Garn, Stanley M., Growth Research in Medicine: Presented at the Symposium on Medical Anthropology, Thirty-first Annual Meeting of the American Association of Physical Anthropologists, 1962, page 1: "With the Grenlich-Pyle Radiographic Atlas of Skeletal Development ('59), Earle Reynolds' standards for sexual maturation (Reynolds and Wines, '48, '51) . . .we surely cover the normative front."
- Reynolds, Earle T. [sic] (June 12, 1952) The Growth and Development Program of the Atomic Bomb Casualty Commission: Analysis of Body Measurements Taken in 1951 on 4,800 Hiroshima children. Folder 7 NYO-4458 From Papers of Carl F. Tessmer Series II. M.D.
- Reynolds, Earle L. (Oct. 30, 1952) "Growth and Development Program of the Atomic Bomb Casualty Commission: Analysis of Observations on Maturation, Body Build and Posture taken in 1951 on 4,800 Hiroshima Children" later published as report NYO-4459 (Folder 100) from Papers of Wataru W. Sutow, M.D.
- Growth & Development: Earle Reynolds Reports etc: 1952-1967
- Reynolds, E.L. The Distribution of Subcutaneous Fat in Childhood and Adolescence (1953)
- Low, F.N., (Sept. 1953) Book Review of Earle L. Reynolds, The Distribution of Subcutaneous Fat in Childhood and Adolescence. The Quarterly Review of Biology, vol. 28, no. 3 doi:10.1086/399783
- Reynolds' paper presented at the 58th Annual Meeting of the American Anthropology Association in Mexico City, (Dec. 28th, 1959) revealed the unpopular truths to be found about the physical dangers of exposure to nuclear radiation. Report was published in The Processes of Ongoing Human Evolution, Gabriel W. Lasker, ed., Detroit: Wayne University Press, 1960.
- Lectures by Earle Reynolds given at Jogakuin College, Hiroshima, Japan, edited and printed in Virginia Naeve, ed. Friends of the Hibakusha. A Swallow Paperback (Alan Swallow, 2679 South York St., Denver, CO), 1964
- The Place of Hiroshima in World History, November 7, 1960.
- Comments on Movie: Still, It's Better to Be Alive (produced by Japan A and H Bomb Council, 1955) n.d.
- Radiation and Human Evolution, Dec. 13, 1960.
- Man's Future, Feb. 14, 1961
- Hiroshima, the Atom and the World, 1961
- Alex F. Roche, Stanley M. Garn, Earle L. Reynolds (University of California, Santa Cruz, California 95064), Meinhard Robinow, Lester W. Sontag. The first seriatim study of human growth and middle aging. (1980)
