= George Willoughby (activist) =

American peace activist (1914–2010)

George Willoughby (December 9, 1914 – January 5, 2010) was a Quaker activist who advocated for world peace, and conducted nonviolent protests against war and preparations for war.

== Biography ==
For the last two decades of his life, Willoughby lived next to the Old Pine Farm Natural Land Trust in Deptford, Gloucester County, part of the New Jersey Green Acres program. Born in 1914, he was raised in the Panama Canal Zone, and later lived in Iowa and Philadelphia.

He met his wife, Lillian Willoughby, in Iowa in the 1930s.

Willoughby was a conscientious objector during World War II and helped find homes for Japanese-Americans who had been put in camps at the outbreak of the war.

He was involved with the Committee for Non-Violent Action (CNVA), formed in 1957 to resist the US Government's program of nuclear weapons testing. CNVA was one of the first organizations to employ direct nonviolent action to protest against the nuclear arms race.

Willoughby was a volunteer crew member of the Golden Rule, a small boat that in 1958 sailed into the South Pacific to protest atomic testing there by the United States. With the other crew members, William R. Huntington, James Peck, Orion Sherwood, and skipper Albert Bigelow he was arrested 5 nautical miles (9 km) from Honolulu and sentenced to 60 days in jail. Their act of non-violent protest against the testing of nuclear arms and the nuclear arms race attracted worldwide media coverage and inspired similar actions by members of the Vancouver-based Don't Make a Wave Committee (which later became Greenpeace).

From 1971 to 1987, George and Lillian Willoughby were central to a group of 20 houses practicing communal living in West Philadelphia, called "The Life Center", devoted to helping the community. The Life Center was home to, and supported the activities of the Philadelphia branch of Movement for a New Society. The Willoughbys resided in a small, third-floor apartment where they practiced living simply. When a Philadelphia Daily News reporter encountered them there in June 1980, they were baking their own bread.

In 1981 Willoughby helped to start Peace Brigades International.

Taking on the simple life was also a way to keep any income away from the federal government. Even so, the IRS confiscated the Willoughbys' red Volkswagen for back taxes. During the auction at the IRS office in Chester, Pennsylvania, in 1970, the Willoughbys and supporters served lemonade in the hallway before submitting the winning bid of $900 to buy the car back.

In 1992, George and Lillian Willoughby provided more than 30 acres of undeveloped property along Big Timber Creek as the foundation of the Old Pine Farm Natural Lands Trust located in Deptford Township, NJ. Part of the New Jersey Green Acres Program, this open space has available to the public from dawn to dusk for more than 20 years.

Willoughby died on January 5, 2010. He was survived by three daughters, Sally Willowbee, Anita and Sharon Willoughby; a son, Alan Willoughby, and three grandchildren.

== See also ==
- List of peace activists
