= John Merritt Sammis =

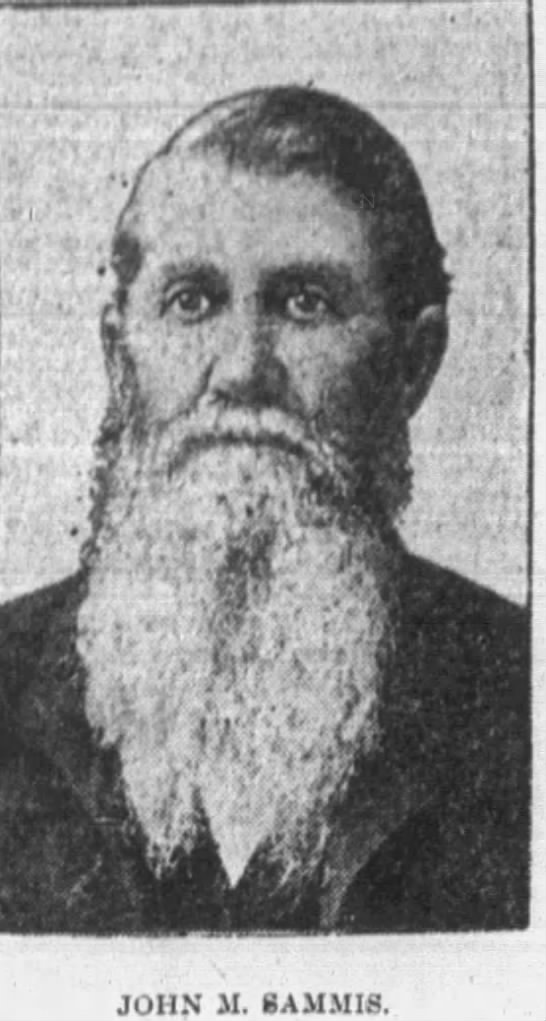
- Sammis at age 80
- Born: October 8, 1820; Oyster Bay, New York, U.S.
- Died: October 17, 1908 (aged 88); Oyster Bay, New York
- Occupation: Merchant
- Spouse: Rebecca Townsend

John M. Sammis (October 8, 1820 – October 17. 1908) was the son of Ezra Sammis and Anna Hawxhurst, born in Oyster Bay, New York, on October 8, 1820. He would live his whole life in Oyster Bay, and during that time became a leading merchant, property owner, and civic figure in Long Island. He was a close personal friend of U.S. President Theodore Roosevelt.

== Biography ==
Sammis was the son of Ezra Sammis and Anna Hawxhurst, born in Oyster Bay on October 8, 1820. In 1837 Sammis went to work at the general store and lumber yard in Oyster Bay Cove operated by Colonel Samuel Youngs. Sammis stayed with Youngs for several years learning the business. In 1843 he opened his own store in Oyster Bay and in 1846 he bought land on South Street opposite the intersection with East Main Street, where he built his own store building. The Walling Map of Kings and Queens County from 1859 shows "J.M.S." owning the building at the corner of South Street and West Main in Oyster Bay, just south of his store.

On January 6, 1847, John M. Sammis was married to Rebecca Townsend, daughter of Isaac Townsend, by the Rev. Marmaduke Earle. Sammis’ daughters would go on to marry influential figures in Oyster Bay. His daughter Sarah E. married Edward A. Hegeman who would late become responsible for managing Sammis’ store. His daughter Mary A. married James H. Ludlam who was responsible for building the brick Greek Revival Ludlam Building at the south-west corner of South and West Main Street that housed a store of his own.

Sammis would go on to make a fortune in the lumber and coal business. He was instrumental in founding of the First Presbyterian Church of Oyster Bay and through those activities became a close personal friend with Theodore Roosevelt. Sammis amassed substantial land holdings supporting his commercial interests. These included the wharf at the end of South Street and much of the property leading up to that especially along the west side of South Street.

Sammis sold the "J.M.S. Store" to Jones and Young in 1868. After selling his store in 1868, Sammis purchased the lumber yard and coal business of James Prior at the foot of White Street. Meanwhile, Jones & Young hired Sammis’ son Edgar to run the store. In 1872 an eighteen-year-old Edward A. Hegeman went to work in the store with his brother-in-law. A few years later Hegeman bought the business from Jones and Young around 1880 and the site became known as Hegeman’s Corner. Hegeman would also marry Sammis’ daughter Sarah.

By the start of the 20th century when John M. Sammis was in his 80s, his advanced age most likely caused him to sell properties he owned to his longtime tenants Arthur Snouder and his son Andrew Snouder. The former J.M. Sammis store was demolished in 1907. As a concession, plate glass windows from the store were removed and used as windows in Snouder's Drug Store a few buildings to the south. Very soon thereafter the North Shore Bank Building was built on this site of Sammis' store.

The demolition of his former store and sale of other properties marked physically and symbolically the transfer of influence over this important area in the heart of the downtown and vis-à-vis change of leadership in the business community in Oyster Bay. Sammis died on October 17, 1908, and services were held at the First Presbyterian Church of Oyster Bay.
