= Golden Rule (ship) =

- Name: Golden Rule
- Port of registry: United States
- Route: San Pedro, CA to Honolulu, HI (1958), Humboldt Bay, CA to San Diego, CA (2014, 2017)
- Builder: Hugh Angelman, Charles Davies
- Launched: 1958, 2010
- Completed: 1958, 2014
- Maiden voyage: 1958
- Out of service: early 1970s, 2010-2015
- Fate: restored/ relaunched
- Status: on peace mission for nuclear disarmament

General characteristics
- Class & type: Alpha
- Length: 30 ft at waterline
- Beam: 12 ft
- Draught: 5 ft
- Sail plan: fore-and-aft gaff rig ketch
- Speed: 8 kts maximum

Golden Rule is a 30-foot gaff ketch-rigged sailboat used for environmental direct action. She is currently operated by Veterans for Peace, and in September 2022 they launched an 11,000 mile Great Loop voyage to promote nuclear non-proliferation and disarmament.

== History ==
The boat was designed by Hugh Angelman and constructed from 1956 to 1958 in Costa Rica. She was originally constructed with sapele and purpleheart. Restoration has been done using, among other south American tropical woods, Hymenaea courbaril.

In 1958, four men associated with the Quaker religion sailed toward Enewetok atoll in the Marshall Islands aboard Golden Rule with the goal of preventing atmospheric nuclear weapons testing. The US Coast Guard stopped the vessel in Honolulu, arresting her skipper, Albert Bigelow, who once served as lieutenant commander in the United States Navy. Different people owned the vessel throughout the years. She sank twice: once in the early 1970s and again in March, 2010. She has been restored since. In July 2015, she had relaunched from Humboldt Bay, California, her present home dock. She continues to sail on a peace mission to promote non-violence and to spread an anti-nuclear message to the general public. Her stops are accompanied by public events to inform the public. In the summer of 2017, she sailed from Eureka, California down the full length of the California coast to San Diego with visits up the Sacramento River to the state capital.

== Veterans for Peace ==
The Golden Rule was rebuilt between 2010 and 2015 by a team led by Veterans For Peace. It has since sailed up and down the West Coast of the US, as well as to Hawai’i and back.

Veterans for Peace began a project in September 2022 to sail the Great Loop from Minnesota down the Mississippi to the Gulf, up the east coast and through the Erie Canal, through the Great Lakes, to end in Chicago in September 2023.

== See also ==
- Albert Bigelow
- Phoenix of Hiroshima
- Rainbow Warrior
- Fri (yacht)
