= The Meeting School =

Farm-based boarding school in New Hampshire, USA, which closed in 2012

Coordinates: 42°44′53″N 72°02′47″W

Information
- Religious affiliation: Quakers
- Established: 1957
- Closed: 2012
- Grades: 9-12
- Enrollment: 15 (2011)

The Meeting School (TMS) was a co-ed boarding school for grades 9-12 based on the practices and principles of the Religious Society of Friends (Quakers). It was located in Rindge, New Hampshire, United States, on a working organic farm with 142 acres (0.57 km^{2}) of field and forest. It closed in 2011.

The mission of TMS was to prepare students with life skills as well as academic knowledge. In a given year, 30-35 students participated in small classes, community living, growing food, and caring for farm animals. Students were engaged, at a highly empowered level, in community decision making.

== History of the school ==
In 1955 a group of Quaker educators found a shared concern, envisioning a school that would educate the whole person, where Quakerism could be a way of life, and where students could become inner directed rather than outer directed. Consulting with other Quaker groups throughout 1956 and ’57, and traveling through Europe and the United States to become familiar with innovative schools and colleges, three families came together in Rindge, and began their experiment. George Bliss, with his wife Helen, had taught at the Westtown Quaker boarding school, and was then executive secretary of the New England office of the American Friends Service Committee. Joel Hayden, a graduate of Deep Springs College, and his wife Ruth Hayden had been professors at Antioch College in Ohio, and Robert and Thera Hindmarsh were agronomists who advised farmers in Deerfield, Massachusetts. They settled on two converted farmsteads, land that had been farmed since 1771, and opened their doors to students in the fall of 1957.

== Suspension of school program ==
During the recession of 2008, The Meeting School dwindled to 15 students. In 2011 the school announced that it would take a "sabbatical" for the 2011-2012 school year with the hope of restructuring in a more financially sustainable business model.

TMS made a decision in early 2012 to terminate business for a variety of reasons.
