= Japan Council against Atomic and Hydrogen Bombs =

Japanese non-governmental organization

The Japan Council against Atomic and Hydrogen Bombs (原水爆禁止日本協議会, Gensuibaku Kinshi Nihon Kyōgikai), usually abbreviated Gensuikyō in Japanese, is a Japanese NGO founded in 1955 that seeks a worldwide ban on nuclear weapons.

== History ==
On March 1, 1954, the Japanese fishing vessel Lucky Dragon No. 5 was showered with radioactive fallout from the U.S. military's 15-megaton "Castle Bravo" hydrogen bomb test at nearby Bikini Atoll. The boat's catch was contaminated, spurring a panic in Japan about the safety of eating fish, and the crew was sickened, with one crew member eventually dying from radiation sickness. In response to these events, a number of Japanese civic groups banded together to form a "National Council for a Petition Drive to Ban Atomic and Hydrogen Bombs" (Gensuibaku Kinshi Shomei Undō Zenkoku Kyōgikai), which managed to accumulate a total of 30 million signatures by August 1955, an impressive figure given that Japan's total population was around 90 million at the time.

To build on this initial success and keep the movement going, the council established a more formal, permanent organization called the Japan Council against Atomic and Hydrogen Bombs (原水爆禁止日本協議会, Gensuibaku Kinshi Nihon Kyōgikai) in 1955. Within a short time, local affiliate organizations were established in all 47 prefectures and many cities and towns around Japan. The organization touted itself as apolitical in order to secure as broad a base of support as possible, and thus drew support from both left-leaning and conservative politicians alike In the later half of the 1950s, Gensuikyō became a vocal leader in the burgeoning worldwide anti-nuclear movement, deriving moral authority from Japan's unique status as the only nation to have been attacked with nuclear weapons.

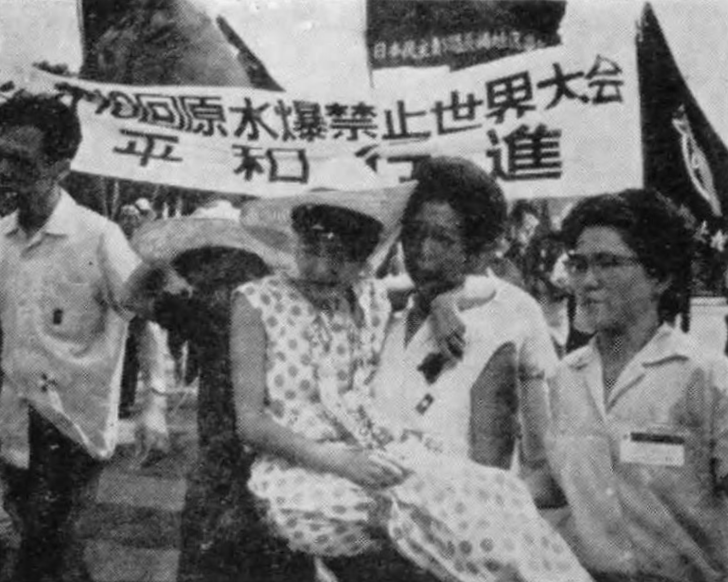
Peace March at the 10th World Conference against Atomic and Hydrogen Bombs (August 1964).

Gensuikyō played an active and enthusiastic role in carrying out the large-scale 1960 Anpo protests against revision of the U.S.-Japan Security Treaty, as many of its members believed that the treaty would place Japan in danger of future nuclear attack by having Japan side with the United States in the Cold War. Gensuikyō's extensive experience with organizing protest movements earned it one of 13 seats on the National Council that organized the Anpo protests. However, Gensuikyō's participation in the protests led the conservative Liberal Democratic Party and the centrist Democratic Socialist Party to leave the organization, as they both supported the new treaty.

The departure of members affiliated with the two more conservative political parties left Gensuikyō under the control of activists affiliated with the Japan Communist Party (JCP) and the Japan Socialist Party (JSP). However, the JCP and the JSP disagreed over the outcome of the Anpo protests and whether Gensuikyō should take part in future protests like that one that did not directly involve nuclear weapons. Moreover, the JCP refused to condemn the Soviet Union resuming atmospheric nuclear testing in 1961, or the People's Republic of China successfully testing a nuclear bomb in 1964, arguing that if the United States had nuclear weapons, the communist nation should too, whereas the JSP argued against all new nuclear weapons testing and development.

These disagreements led to a schism in Gensuikyō, with the JSP-affiliated groups splitting off to form a rival organization bearing the very similar name "Japan People's Council against Atomic and Hydrogen Bombs" (原水爆禁止日本国民会議, Gensuibaku Kinshi Nihon Kokumin Kaigi)), usually abbreviated Gensuikin. Today both groups remain active, and sometimes collaborate for large-scale protest events, but Gensuikyō remains largely under the control of the JCP, whereas Gensuikin has more diffuse political affiliations following the demise of the JSP in the 1990s.
