= Great Loop =

System of waterways in the eastern United States and part of Canada

The Great Loop Routes Overview
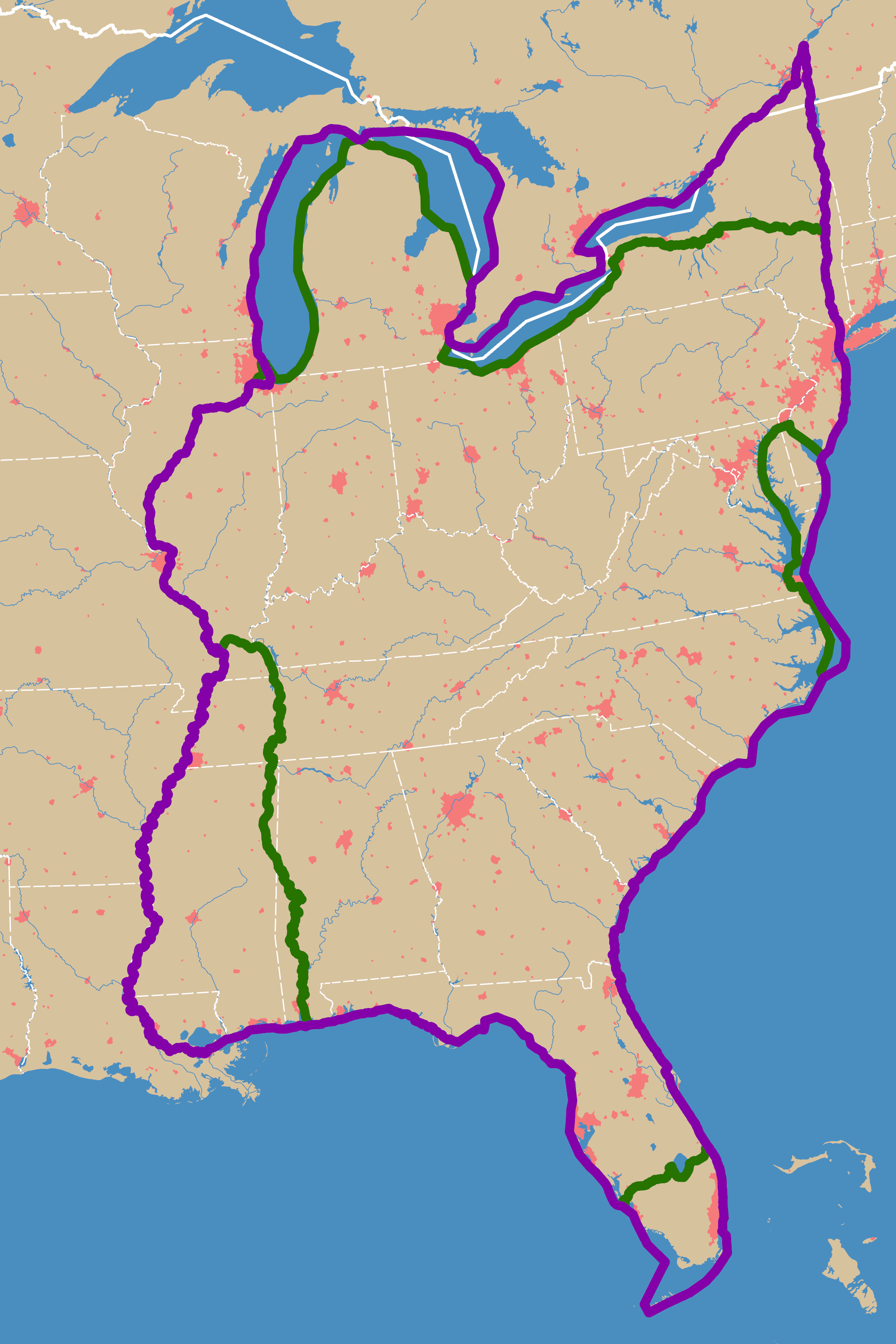
- Two possible routes to complete the Great Loop

Details
- Location: Eastern portion of the United States and part of Canada
- Length: 6,000 mi (9,700 km) +/-

The Great Loop is a system of waterways that encompasses the eastern portion of the United States and part of Canada. It is made up of both natural and man-made waterways, including the Atlantic and Gulf Intracoastal Waterways, the Great Lakes, the Erie Canal, and the Mississippi and Tennessee–Tombigbee Waterway. The entire loop stretches about 6,000 miles (9,700 km).

== Overview ==
There is no single route or itinerary to complete the loop. To avoid winter ice and summer hurricanes, boaters generally traverse the Great Lakes and Canadian waterways in summer, travel down the Mississippi or the Tennessee–Tombigbee Waterway in fall, cross the Gulf of Mexico and Florida in the winter, and travel up the Atlantic Intracoastal Waterway in the spring. Depending on speed of travel, the route can take as little as two months, but more typically it takes about a year to complete the trip. The route may also be completed in segments.

The current overall record time for completing the great loop is 12 days, 18 hours, and 10 minutes. This run took place between July 9 and July 21, 2025, by a team of four on the Lady Lor, a 40-foot (12 m) Contender Express. The solo and single engine records are 19 days, 13 hours, and 1 minute. This run took place between July 12 and July 31, 2025, and was completed by Robert Youens, a 71-year-old adventurer from Austin, Texas. The run was completed in a 16-foot (4.9 m) johnboat, the Ageless Wanderer.

== Route information ==
Assuming a boat ("Looper") begins in Chicago, either take the Chicago River and Chicago Sanitary and Ship Canal, or the Cal-Sag Channel to the Des Plaines River. The waterway passes Joliet and soon becomes the Illinois River. The Illinois River travels west, through several locks, then southward, through Peoria. At Grafton, Illinois, the Illinois River joins the Mississippi River.

Travel south past St Louis and Cape Girardeau, Missouri. At the confluence of the Mississippi and Ohio Rivers at Cairo, Illinois, either continue down the Mississippi to New Orleans, Louisiana, or follow the more typical route of briefly going upstream on the Ohio River, then turn south down the Tennessee-Tombigbee Waterway to the Gulf of Mexico. Because of heavy barge traffic, lack of marinas and scarcity of fuel sources on the Lower Mississippi River, most Loopers opt for the Tennessee-Tombigbee Waterway passage.

Traversing the 184 mile length of Kentucky Lake, continue up the Tennessee River and turn off onto the Tenn-Tom Waterway, near Iuka, Mississippi. A series of locks will lower boats to the Lower Tombigbee River, which eventually reaches Mobile, a major port on the Gulf of Mexico. Some boaters choose to continue up the Tennessee River to Chattanooga, TN and Knoxville, TN as a side-trip.

Continuing eastward along the Intracoastal Waterway (ICW) through the Florida Panhandle, at some point crossing the Gulf of Mexico to the main part of Florida. The ICW continues from St. Petersburg southward. Either cross South Florida via Lake Okeechobee, or go around it via the Florida Keys.

The Loop swings northward up the ICW along Florida's Atlantic Coast, through coastal Georgia, South Carolina, and North Carolina. To reach Chesapeake Bay, take the Dismal Swamp Canal or the Albemarle and Chesapeake Canal. Travel north through Chesapeake Bay to the Chesapeake and Delaware Canal and into the Delaware Bay. After crossing Delaware Bay to Cape May, New Jersey, all but the smallest boats can travel in the Atlantic Ocean to New York City.

Entering the Hudson River in New York, go to Waterford, New York. Here, some Loopers keep going north on the Champlain Canal and do a side-loop through Montreal, Canada. Most will traverse all or part of the Erie Canal. Shorter height boats may travel the entire canal to Buffalo, New York, then through Lake Erie, past Detroit, eventually reaching Lake Huron. Many others — especially those too tall for the Western Erie Canal Bridges — take the Oswego Canal north to Lake Ontario. This option allows Loopers to either take the Welland Canal to Lake Erie or to cruise along the scenic Trent-Severn Waterway in Ontario, Canada to reach Georgian Bay on Lake Huron.

Lake Huron is a destination for all Looper boats, regardless of route and any side-trips. All boats have to transit the Straits of Mackinac at the top of Michigan's Lower Peninsula and enter Lake Michigan. An optional side-trip is going through the Soo Locks and visiting Lake Superior.

Loopers have the option to follow either the Wisconsin or Michigan coasts as they make their way south on Lake Michigan and back to the starting point in Chicago.

== Looper culture ==
Those boaters who are on the loop often fly a white burgee, and those who have completed the loop fly a gold one.

The America's Great Loop Cruisers' Association (AGLCA) assists Great Loop cruisers by sharing safety and navigational and cruising information, while providing a networking platform for Loopers through its members-only discussion forum. Boaters can exchange information about topics such as marinas, locking through, water depth, hazards, repairs, fuel prices or dinner reservations and sight seeing. The AGLCA also hosts twice-yearly gatherings for Loopers currently on the Loop and those planning a Great Loop trip.

== See also ==
- Inland waterways of the United States
