= Ludlam Building =

Coordinates: 40°52′19.33″N 73°31′51.7″W

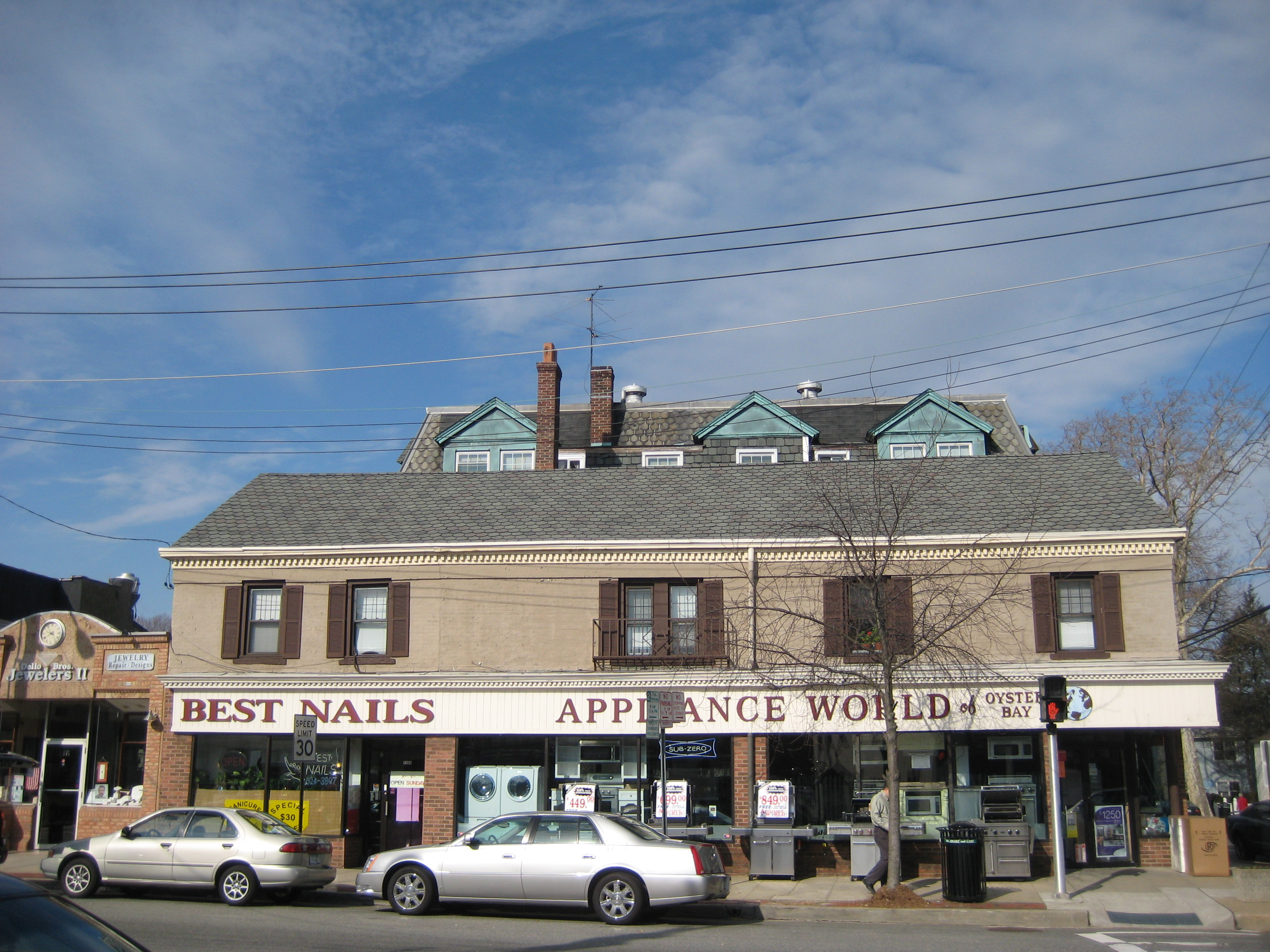
Photo of the Ludlam Building, 2008

The Ludlam Building is a Greek Revival styled building, located in Oyster Bay, New York. Past occupants include a dry goods store, a grocery store, and a haberdashery. Despite a number of fires, the brick shell of the building remains.

== History ==
This building is called the Ludlam Building after James Ludlam, who built it in 1849. This date does not mark the beginning of Ludlam's business in Oyster Bay, however; he had been the proprietor of a dry goods store since 1836 in a building on the corner of Spring Street and West Main (or Broadway as it was then called). To the east was a building occupied by a cabinetmaker, a tailor, and the Sons of Temperance.

After closing time on November 6, 1848, a fire started in the cabinetmaker's shop, which burned it to the ground and spread to Ludlam's store, completely destroying it. Instead of rebuilding on that site, he bought a plot of land on the corner of West Main and South Street and built the two story building that stands here today. He passed his thriving business on to his sons James and Fredrick who later sold it to Roger Royce. Mr. Royce was operating a grocery store in 1907 when he faced their father's worst nightmare.

Nearby was the Long's Opera House whose cast had just closed up for the night after a performance of "Driven Home." In the back of the Opera House a fire started which quickly spread throughout the adjacent buildings. Luckily for Royce, the Atlantic Steamer Fire Company responded with their Silsby Steamer drawn by a team of horses. They drafted water from Anthony's Brook which flowed down South Street and valiantly fought the blazing fire. The Opera House was destroyed as well as a private home and a millinery shop, but the Post Office and the Ludlam Building, though scorched were saved. Soon after the fire, Mr. Royce sold the building to the Kursman brothers, who ran a dry goods and clothing store.

The Kursman's, later joined by David Bernstein, continued with their business into the 1930s. Then, on April 12, 1932, fire struck again. This time the interior of the Ludlam Building was gutted, including all the inventory and fixtures; only the brick walls remained. Afterwards David Bernstein rebuilt the structure and operated a popular haberdashery called Dave's Shop for more than thirty years. This Greek Revival brick building survives as one of the oldest commercial storefronts in the village, and for over a decade has been the home of Appliance World.

== See also ==
- Oyster Bay History Walk
- List of Town of Oyster Bay Landmarks
- National Register of Historic Places listings in Nassau County, New York
