= First Presbyterian Church of Oyster Bay =

Historic church in New York, United States

- U.S. National Register of Historic Places
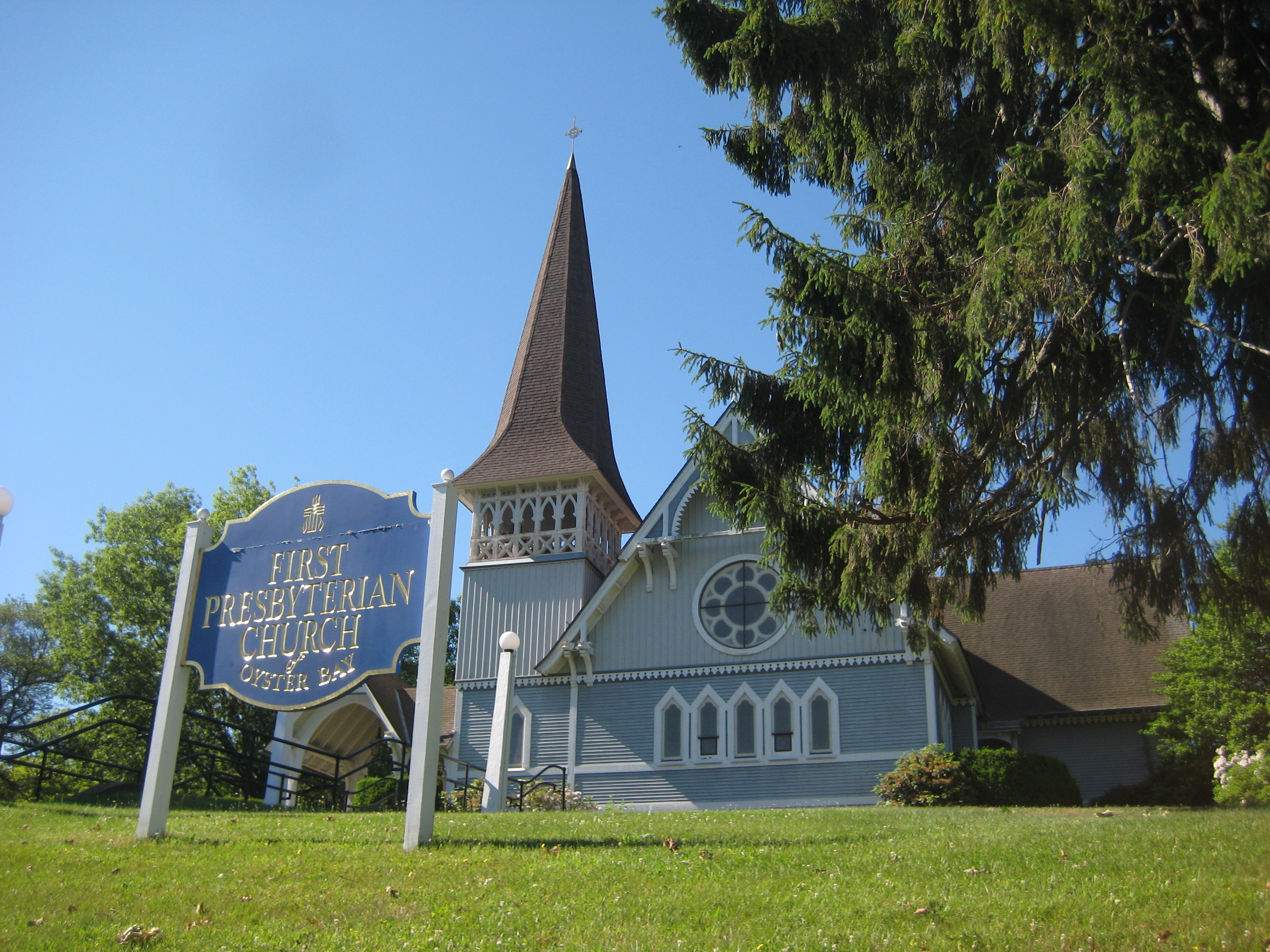
- Oyster Bay Presbyterian Church, 2008

- Location within New York Location within the United States
- Location: E. Main Street, Oyster Bay, New York
- Coordinates: 40°52′18.25″N 73°31′45.35″W
- Area: 1 acre (0.40 ha)
- Built: 1873
- Architect: J. Cleaveland Cady
- Architectural style: Stick/Eastlake
- NRHP reference No.: 76001232
- Added to NRHP: December 12, 1976

First Presbyterian Church built in 1873 is classified as an historic Stick/Eastlake style Presbyterian Church building located at 60 East Main Street in Oyster Bay, in the U.S. state of New York. Its architect was J. Cleaveland Cady, who was just beginning his career and would go on to design the original Metropolitan Opera House, the American Museum of Natural History, buildings at Yale University, Trinity College, and 23 other churches including the Plantsville Congregational Church, Southington, CT in the similar Gothic Revival style.

The congregation which dates back to 1842, is noted for its association with Theodore Roosevelt Sr., his wife, Martha Bulloch Roosevelt, and their children including their son, Theodore Roosevelt Jr., the future President of the United States. The funeral of Theodore Roosevelt Sr. was held in this building in 1878.

On December 12, 1976, the church building was added to the National Register of Historic Places.

== History ==
First Presbyterian Church's ministry began in Oyster Bay, New York, in 1842. In its early days the congregation had no permanent church building. A traveling pastor from Hempstead, the Rev. Mr. Woodbridge, preached at the Oyster Bay Academy or at the Baptist Church on West Main Street.

The first church building was located on East Main Street at the rear half of the present Nobman's Hardware. In the 1850s the congregation faced financial difficulties and was unable to function. Growth and reorganization occurred in the 1860s so that by 1872 led by pastor Benjamin L. Swan, it began building this church on the hill. The architect selected was J. Cleaveland Cady.

Dramatic arched entryways inside the church are inscribed with Biblical verses. A Hillborn Roosevelt pipe organ was placed at the front of church. William L. Swan donated and played the organ for next 52 years. The future President, Theodore Roosevelt, attended his father's funeral service held here and later wrote in his diary how he saw his father sitting beside him in the pew, "as distinctly as if he were alive."

== See also ==
- Oyster Bay History Walk
- List of Town of Oyster Bay Landmarks
- List of New York State Historic Markers, Town of Oyster Bay
- National Register of Historic Places listings in Nassau County, New York
