= James Peck (pacifist) =

American activist and pacifist

- Born: December 19, 1914; Manhattan, New York, U.S.
- Died: July 12, 1993 (aged 78); Minneapolis, Minnesota, U.S.
- Known for: Civil rights activism

James Peck (December 19, 1914 – July 12, 1993) was an American activist who practiced nonviolent resistance during World War II and in the Civil Rights Movement. He is the only person who participated in both the Journey of Reconciliation in 1947 and the first Freedom Ride of 1961, and has been called a white civil rights hero. Peck advocated nonviolent civil disobedience throughout his life, and was arrested more than 60 times between the 1930s and 1980s.

== Biography ==
=== Overview ===
James Peck (usually called "Jim") was born in Manhattan, the son of Samuel Peck, a wealthy clothing wholesaler, who died when his son was eleven years old. He attended Choate Rosemary Hall, a private boarding school in Wallingford, Connecticut. Even though Peck and his family had converted from Judaism to the Episcopalian Church, Peck was still considered a social outsider at Choate. Peck preferred the fellowship of scholarly intellectuals, and in their company he developed a reputation as an independent thinker. At the same time, he adopted idealistic political doctrines. He enrolled and studied at Harvard in 1933.

While studying at Harvard, Peck polished his skills as a writer and engaged in radical acts that ended up shocking his classmates and forcing him to become the outsider once again. Peck wrote that his mother "referred to Negroes as 'coons'" and he chose to defy her and his classmates by asking a black girl to be his date at the Freshman dance. He dropped out of school at the end of his freshman year when "his alienation from his family and the American establishment was complete".

Peck was married to the former Paula Zweier for twenty-two years. She was a teacher of cooking and author of The Art of Fine Baking (1961) and Art of Good Cooking (1966). Paula Peck died in 1972. They had two sons, Charles and Samuel.

Peck was critical of both U.S. political parties throughout his life, leaning toward a radical form of democratic-socialism. He thought a Utopian world was impossible, and that there would always be a battle between what he called the "Upperdogs" and "Underdogs." He considered himself on the side of the underdogs.

Peck was a member of numerous antiwar and civil rights organizations, and spent his life as a radical journalist. He assisted the War Resisters League, and eventually became editor of WRL News until the 1980s. He also edited the Workers' Defense League News Bulletin. In the 1930s he wrote a labor column for a paper published by the WRL, The Conscientious Objector.

Beginning in 1938, he worked at Federated Press and reported on union activism and joined the American Newspaper Guild. Peck worked as editor of CORE-lator, CORE's newsletter, from the 1940s to the 1960s. Beginning in 1967, Peck became news editor of WIN magazine, a youth antiwar magazine. At times he wrote articles in numerous pacifist publications, such as Liberation magazine.

=== Labor Activism in the 1930s ===
Peck's first protest was in New York City at an anti-Nazi rally in 1934. His second protest was participating in the New York City May Day parade that year.

Peck was hired as a deck boy in 1935, and he joined in a labor strike for better food on the boat during his first voyage. Later in 1935, Peck was on a boat that anchored in Pensacola, Florida, where Peck joined the longshoremen who were on strike. Peck claimed the union hall was fully integrated at the time by the striking longshoremen. Peck remained there for two weeks before police arrested him for distributing rank-and-file literature on a boat, marking his first arrest.

Peck helped to found what later became the National Maritime Union, a radical union for sailors and other maritime workers that split from the more conservative International Seamen's Union in 1937. That union grew out of a strike of workers aboard a ship anchored in New York City led by Joseph Curran in March 1936; Peck picketed with the longshoremen for the first time on March 22, 1936, and again from November 1936 to January 1937. Peck later criticized Joseph Curran's transformation from a rank-and-file champion into an autocrat once in power in the NMU.

On May 11, 1936, Peck was arrested for the second time in his life. Police clashed with striking seamen that day, with Peck being beaten and arrested. This marked Peck's first mass arrest, as one of 221 strikers arrested that day. That night they were arraigned, making it the largest group every arraigned at the same time in that courtroom.

=== World War II Draft Resistance ===
During World War II, Peck was a conscientious objector and an anti-war activist, and consequently spent three years in jail at Danbury Correctional Institution in Connecticut (1942–1945). While in prison, he helped start a labor strike that eventually led to the desegregation of the mess hall.

During this time, he participated, as did many other conscientious objectors, in medical experiments, especially a yellow jaundice experiment which permanently damaged his liver. Peck viewed it as volunteering to help discover a cure for the disease, and for humanity.

=== World War II Amnesty Movement ===
Peck immediately joined protests to grant amnesty to WWII conscientious objectors (COs) after his release from Danbury prison in 1945. Peck worked with the Committee for Amnesty for All Objectors to War and Conscrption in organizing protests and writing press releases. Peck took part in the first amnesty protest at the White House on October 15, 1945. Peck picketed outside Danbury Prison on February 12, 1946, demanding amnesty, while prisoners were on strike inside. On May 11, 1946, Peck joined the largest amnesty protest until then of 100 people at the White House, while CO prisoners carried out hunger strikes.

On December 22, 1946, Peck was one of 15 activists outside the White House, who managed to get press attention because they all wore black-and-white prison outfits to represent WWII COs remaining in prison. In June 1947, Peck attended another theatrical amnesty rally. A small group staged a "mock funeral" in front of the White House. Pallbearers dressed in formal attire and carried a coffin marked "justice." On September 25, 1947, Peck joined 40 amnesty demonstrators, at the NYC station for the "Freedom Train" - a patriotic train filled with U.S. declarations and documents that ran through 48 states in two years beginning in 1947. Demonstrators once again wore prison outfits, which gained the attention of thousands of bystanders and reporters at the station. Police ordered them to move, but 19 activists, including Peck, refused to move and were arrested. Those arrested won in court, and years later the police chief was ordered to issue a public apology.

On Christmas Day, 1947, Peck joined 15 activists outside the White House, two days after President Truman granted amnesty on solely religious grounds to 1,523 COs out of more than 15,000. This meant Peck's sentence was not removed from his record. In January 1948, Peck wrote in a letter to the editor in the New York Times, stating that 16 other countries granted amnesty to all WWII COs, and the refusal to do so by the U.S. "seriously belies our professions of democracy."

WWII Amnesty protests continued into the 1950s, but without successfully changing any laws. On December 10, 1955, Peck led a picket of 40 people wearing his Uncle Sam outfit, demanding a Christmas amnesty.

=== Anti-draft Activism in the 1940s ===
Peck and a small handful of WWII COs led the protests against the military draft in the 1940s. On March 25, 1946, Peck was among nine activists arrested for picketing outside a D.C. hotel that hosted a dinner for U.N. Security Council delegates. Peck handed out literature encouraging people not to sign up for military service.

In 1947, President Truman introduced a peacetime draft in Congress, which Peck protested. Peck worked with Bayard Rustin and A.J. Muste to organize a nationwide protest against the draft on February 12, 1947. More than 500 demonstrators burnt their draft cards in more than 30 states. Peck led the most popular action that day, when 15 people burned their draft cards at the White House without any arrests.

Peck worked with A. Philip Randolph, a Black union leader, after President Truman proposed the Universal Military Training Act (UMT), which continued segregation in the military. In April 1948, the WRL assigned Peck to head the Committee on Publicity, which was tasked with printing letters of support for Randolph's call of nonviolent resistance to the draft. The peacetime draft passed on June 19, 1948. Continued protests by Randolph and pacifists led to Truman passing Executive Order 9981, which abolished segregation in the military. This brought an end to Peck working with Randolph.

On June 5, 1948, Peck joined 75 demonstrators in a creative picket outside the White House against UMT. Peck and seven other demonstrators wore red, white and blue Uncle Sam outfits, as they goose-stepped in circles. After the passage of UMT, Peck took on an individual protest at the White House on June 22, 1948. Peck entered the White House in a public tour and quickly chained himself to a banister, and then removed his jacket to reveal a shirt with the hand-painted slogan: "Veto the Draft." This became one of his most famous protests at the time, and it garnered the attention of most news stations. He was interrogated and accused of being a Communist after being removed from the White House, but was let go without charges.

Protests broke out in several cities on August 30, 1948, the first day to register for the peacetime draft. Peck joined Bayard Rustin at a rally in New York City without arrests. Peck and Rustin were arrested on September 3, 1948, at an anti-draft picket in New York City. Both Peck and Rustin received 15 days in Rikers Island, after the judge yelled racial slurs at Rustin. Peck protested outside a New York City courthouse on October 15, 1948, in support of Stuart Perkoff, who was the first person in New York City to defy the Selective Service Act. Two weeks later Perkoff changed his mind, fearing a long sentence.

Peck supported the World Citizens Movement headed by Garry Davis, who objected to conscription and war. WWII COs supported Davis when he was in court in France in October 1949. October 4 was announced as an international pacifist day of solidarity, and Peck was one of a dozen activists arrested for protesting at the French embassy in D.C.

On April 29, 1950, Peck was assaulted by two American Legion members at the third annual Loyalty Day Parade in New York City, for passing out pacifist literature. He did not press charges.

On July 7, 1950, Peck traveled to the U.N. Assembly at Lake Success (its temporary headquarters), where it was discussed whether the U.S. should enter the Korean War. Peck and three other pacifists passed out literature against the war, and Peck made it into the building without being noticed. Peck found himself at the delegates entrance door, and entered when the meeting began. He passed out his literature to most delegates before security realized what he was doing. Peck was carried out of the room by security, which gained the attention of most newspapers, and he was released without charges.

=== Anti-Nuclear Movement ===
In 1946, Peck was arrested in New York City for being involved in the "first nonviolent direct action against nuclear tests." On July 24, 1946, Peck and 35 demonstrators pulled around a stuffed goat rented from a taxidermist in New York City, representing the actual goats left on the Marshall Islands, where the U.S. conducted the Bikini atom bomb experiment that day. Peck was arrested that day and received a $10 fine. A few weeks later Peck and a similar size group marched from the Pentagon down Pennsylvania Avenue, and were arrested for marching without a permit.

Peck and a small group of pacifists protested at the Easter Parade in New York City on May 27, 1947, passing out antinuclear literature. Peck and nine other activists were arrested while marching along the side of the parade. Peck refused to pay the $10 fine, and served 15 days in Rikers Island.

Peck marched in the Easter Parade against nuclear weapons on April 17, 1949, along with eight other activists. Police ordered the group to disperse, but Peck and Mat Kauten refused, and were both arrested. Peck was carried to the police squad by four cops, and his arrest landed in the New York Times. Peck served five days in jail. Peck was arrested again at the Easter Parade with three other people in 1952.

In April 1950, Peck joined the peace vigil at the Maryland office of the United States Atomic Energy Commission (AEC) to protest the atomic bomb. Peck was briefly arrested for passing out literature in New York City during an air raid drill on September 25, 1953, but was released with no charges. In 1955 and 1956, he was arrested for refusing to take cover during the simulated air raid drills in New York City, which were brought to an end in the early 1960s due to massive civil disobedience. On June 15, 1955, Peck was one of 28 people arrested for standing in New York City Hall Park during the first major protest against the nationwide air raid drills. Peck was arrested with other pacifists such as A.J. Muste, Bayard Rustin and Ralph DiGia, as well as Catholic Worker members Dorothy Day and Ammon Hennacy.

Peck was arrested with 17 other people in Washington Square Park on July 20, 1956, during the second major protest against the air raid drills. He was arrested again with Dorothy Day and Ammon Hennacy, and was joined by George Willoughby and Quaker Robert Gilmore, who later became a leader for the anti-nuclear organization, SANE. In May 1960, Peck refused to take shelter during the New York City air raid drill along with 500 other persons, marking the largest act of civil disobedience against the program.

In 1957, Peck was one of the founding members of the new organization Non-Violent Action Against Nuclear Weapons, one of the leading antinuclear groups at that time. Peck was arrested with ten others at the organization's first event on August 6, 1957, for engaging in civil disobedience at the nuclear test site in Nevada. Beginning in 1958, Peck took part in the large "Walk for Peace" campaigns conducted internationally, and became involved in the "Golden Rule" campaign. The "Golden Rule" was a 30-foot ketch that set sail into the nuclear testing sites in the Pacific Ocean as an act of protest. Peck was not part of the initial crew, but participated in a week-long fast inside an AEC building, with roughly a dozen other persons in support of the "Golden Rule".

In June, Peck filled an open spot on the "Golden Rule," and was arrested with the crew six miles off the shore of Honolulu. The entire crew served 60 days in jail. Peck became one of the most famous antinuclear activists in the country following the "Golden Rule" campaign. He traveled to the Geneva Conference that fall to advocate for a mutual test ban treaty between the US and Soviet Union.

On June 18, 1960, when Peck was picketing nuclear bases in New London, he was attacked by a mob of workers, who destroyed his placard. When the Soviet Union resumed nuclear tests in August 1961, Peck was part of a delegation that delivered a peace statement to the Soviet embassy. Peck returned to the Soviet embassy on October 28 with 2,000 demonstrators, and he was part of the delegation that delivered the peace declaration.

In 1962, Peck was directly involved in the growing antinuclear movement. On January 30, he and 200 other persons demonstrated outside an AEC building in New York. On March 3, Peck was one of 42 demonstrators arrested near Times Square, after police violently attacked nonviolent anti-nuclear activists. On April 21, Peck was involved in the massive Easter protest of 5,000 demonstrators in New York City, and was quoted in the "New York Times" the next day about the need for direct action. On May 10, more than 600 persons protested nuclear tests at the UN in NYC. Peck led one of the delegations to the British embassy, where he performed a sit-down. In October, Peck joined over 10,000 demonstrators in protesting against nuclear war in New York City, which was the largest antinuclear rally up until then.

Then on Easter in 1963, Peck was a guest speaker for the rally in Detroit that gathered over a thousand demonstrators. When the Test-Ban Treaty was signed by the U.S. and U.S.S.R in 1963, Peck claimed the credit was due to the nonviolent direct actions over the past decade. Throughout the antinuclear campaign, Peck opposed the use of nuclear weapons by all nations, and he chanted the popular pacifist slogan: "No Tests – East or West." In October 1964, when China conducted its first nuclear test, Peck took part in the first American protest against China's use of nuclear weapons. After the signing of the Test-Ban Treaty, the antinuclear movement was overshadowed by the antiwar movement, and didn't gain momentum again until the 1970s.

=== Civil Rights Movement: 1940s-1950s ===
After the war he became a "radical journalist". Peck joined the Congress of Racial Equality (CORE) in 1946, where he worked as the publicity officer, and later as the editor for the "CORE-lator". CORE was a tiny organization with only a handful of members throughout the 1950s, providing Peck the opportunity to take a leading role in the organization as the head editor, until CORE grew dramatically in the 1960s. Peck was removed from this position in 1965 when the organization ousted white leaders.

Peck was arrested with Bayard Rustin in Durham, North Carolina, during the Journey of Reconciliation in April 1947, which was an interstate integrated bus journey through the South, and acted as a precursor to the later Freedom Rides of 1961. In Chapel Hill, North Carolina, during the Journey, Peck was attacked by an angry white mob, with one mob member punching him in the side of the head, but Peck remained nonviolent and safely walked away. Peck was arrested a second time during the Journey for sitting in an integrated group on the bus in Asheville, North Carolina.

In the summer of 1947, Peck was beaten and arrested two times during a CORE campaign that aimed to integrate Palisades Park in New Jersey, which directly led to the passage of the New Jersey 1949 Freeman Bill. He was first arrested with six other people on August 3, 1947, for picketing in front of the pool ticket booth. On August 31, 1947, Peck was one of 28 people were arrested outside the park, and he claimed a police officer knocked him unconscious.

Peck endorsed Martin Luther King Jr.'s Montgomery Campaign, while debating Roy Wilkins of the NAACP about how direct action was just as critically needed as legal procedures in winning civil rights. During the southern sit-in movement in 1960, Peck and other CORE members performed weekly pickets outside Woolworth stores for 15 months straight in New York City.

Peck was also the leading civil rights activist in the "Proxies Campaign," a method where Peck protested segregated businesses stockholder meetings. From 1948 to 1955, Peck attended the stockholder meetings for Greyhound Company, usually holding one share of stock in the company or representing others who held stock. He was joined by Bayard Rustin a few times, and CORE members protested outside the building during the meetings. From the floor, Peck argued that the company should enforce integration in the south.

Similarly, he attended W.T. Grant's 1954 stockholder meeting, where he successfully convinced business owners to desegregate their chains in Baltimore, Maryland. In 1960, Peck used this same formula at stockholder meetings for Woolworth, Grants and S. H. Kress & Co., as well as protesting at McCrory Stores's meeting in April 1961. The Proxies Campaign was later popularized by Saul Alinsky, although he didn't perform such actions until the late-1960s.

=== Freedom Rides and Civil Rights Activism: 1960s-1970s ===
In 1961, Peck and 15 other volunteers traveled South in the famous Freedom Rides. Peck was arrested on May 10 in Winnsboro, South Carolina, for sitting in an integrated group at a lunch counter. On May 14, Peck was on the second Trailways bus leaving Atlanta, Georgia for Birmingham, Alabama. The first bus, a Greyhound, left an hour earlier and was burned in a firebombing in Anniston, Alabama, seriously injuring the passengers. An hour later, the Trailways bus pulled in at the terminal in Anniston. Eight Klansmen boarded and assaulted the Freedom Riders. Peck, a frail, middle-aged man at the time, was severely injured in the beating and required fifty stitches.

Later, in Birmingham, Peck and Charles Person, a black student from Atlanta, were the first to descend from the bus, into a crowd of Klansmen who, with the organizational help of Birmingham Public Safety Commissioner Bull Connor, were waiting for the Freedom Riders. Howard K. Smith, reporting on-the-scene for CBS, described the ensuing violence on the radio, in words cited by John Lewis in his 1998 autobiography, Walking with the Wind: "Toughs grabbed the passengers into alleys and corridors, pounding them with pipes, with key rings, and with fists. One passenger was knocked down at my feet by twelve of the hoodlums, and his face was beaten and kicked until it was a bloody pulp." Lewis adds, "That was Jim Peck's face."

Peck was severely beaten and needed 53 stitches to his head. Peck was taken to Carraway Methodist Medical Center, a segregated hospital, which refused to treat him. He was later treated at Jefferson Hillman Hospital.

External videos
- “Interview with James Peck” conducted in 1979 for America, They Loved You Madly, a precursor to the Eyes on the Prize documentary in which he describes participating in the Freedom Rides.

The Freedom Ride was Peck's most famous action, resulting in him gaining popularity as a white civil rights hero. He traveled around the nation representing CORE in speeches, and gained even more attention for the Movement on June 5, when he confronted former President Truman about his recent remarks denouncing the Freedom Riders, making Truman seem behind the times in racial justice. At Peck's suggestion, a Route 40 Freedom Ride project was launched by CORE in December 1961, resulting in half the restaurants desegregating along Route 40 in Baltimore. Peck was arrested along with 14 others after attempting to integrate a restaurant.

In May 1962, after he published his book "Freedom Ride," Peck was one of the main leaders for the Project Baltimore campaign, which led to more restaurants desegregating. That summer, Peck was one of the leaders of the Freedom Highways campaign, which sought to integrate highway restaurants in North Carolina.

Following the Freedom Rides, Peck became good friends with William Lewis Moore, a white civil rights worker who became a martyr for the movement after he was shot and killed in the south during his solo Freedom March in the spring of 1963. When Moore was killed, Peck delivered the eulogy at his funeral. Peck gave the opening speech on May 19, when several dozen activists continued the march from where Moore was shot down. After the walkers were arrested and taken to jail, Peck and others marched to the jail singing Freedom songs.

On August 2, 1963, Peck was one of 30 people arrested for performing a sit-down in the street, while protesting the discriminatory state policies for the construction of the Downstate Medical Center in Brooklyn. On October 20, Peck spoke about the racist policies in front of 700 demonstrators at a New York City rally. Peck took part in the August 28, 1963 March on Washington for Jobs and Freedom, which over 250,000 persons attended, on behalf of CORE.

On December 7, Peck traveled to the newest Levittown in Bowie, Maryland, to picket discriminatory housing policies. On April 22, 1964, Peck was one of the leaders for CORE's campaign at the opening day of New York's World Fair, protesting the discriminatory policies held by most companies sponsoring the Fair. More than 300 demonstrators were arrested on the Fair's opening day, including CORE leader James Farmer, Bayard Rustin, Michael Harrington and Peck.

In March 1965, Peck represented CORE at the historic march from Selma to Montgomery, concluding with 50,000 demonstrators entering Montgomery on March 25. Peck spoke as a CORE representative that day, honoring William Moore in his speech. When Peck returned home after the march, he was removed from CORE, after working there for 17 years, because he was white. Peck denounced the decision as "reverse-racism," and never accepted the slogan of Black Power.

After he was removed from CORE, Peck personally funded King's campaigns, especially his 1968 Poor People's Campaign. A year after being removed from CORE, Peck took part in the March Against Fear in June 1966. During this campaign the slogan Black Power arose, which Peck bitterly denounced. At a concert held one night during the march, Peck wrote King a letter, stating:

I wanted to assure you that, despite the dirty deal I have received from CORE, I am still with The Movement and shall be as long as I live.

When King was assassinated in April 1968, Peck honored him by traveling to Memphis on April 8, to join 40,000 other demonstrators marching in support of the Memphis Sanitation strike that King had supported prior to his death. After the Memphis March, Peck traveled to Atlanta for King's funeral, which concluded with 50,000 demonstrators marching over four miles. In May 1969, Peck joined Coretta King and Ralph Abernathy in Charleston, South Carolina, to support black nurses on strike.

Peck continued civil rights activism into the 1970s. On March 8, 1975, he joined 3,000 people in Selma, Alabama, to commemorate the ten-year anniversary of Bloody Sunday. On December 14, 1974, Peck joined 20,000 people marching to the Boston Common, to demand an end to the racist attacks on school busing. Peck returned to Boston on in May 1975, when he joined 15,000 people in a large NAACP march. On April 15, 1978, Peck joined 10,000 people in D.C. to protest the reverse discriminationBakke case then pending before the Supreme Court.

=== Vietnam War Protests ===
Peck continued his activism by demonstrating against the Vietnam War. Peck began demonstrating against the Vietnam War in 1963 through the WRL-initiated Committee of Public Conscience and the Crisis Subcommittee, which quickly organized demonstrations in crisis situations. In October 1964 he helped launch the weekly Times Square Vigil against the war, which he participated in nearly every week for 8 1/3 years, from October 1964, to January 1973. Between 1965 and 1975, Peck attended every major rally in Washington, D.C., and was arrested 12 times for protesting the war. On February 19, 1965, when demonstrations against the war occurred in 30 cities nationwide, Peck was one of 14 people arrested in New York City for conducting a sit-down at the US Mission to the UN.

On August 9, 1965, Peck was one of 356 demonstrators arrested outside the Capitol Building during the Assembly of Unrepresented People for taking part in a massive sit-in against the war, marking the largest amount of arrests at the Capitol up to that time. Starting in October 1965, Peck took part in the massive New York demonstrations coordinated by the single largest city coalition - the Fifth Avenue Vietnam Peace Parade Committee - which organized the nation's largest demonstrations on international days of peace. Peck openly advocated for coalition building, along with civil disobedience. In November 1965, Peck joined 25,000 demonstrators in D.C. for a rally organized by SANE.

In 1966, Peck signed two tax resistance declarations and began advising young people to avoid the draft. On February 23, 1966, Peck attended a dinner that honored President Johnson with a "Peace Award" at the Wardolf-Astoria hotel in New York City. Peck painted on the front and back of his shirt, "Peace in Vietnam," but was covered by his coat. When Johnson was about begin his speech, Peck took off his coat, stood on his chair and yelled: "Mr. President, Peace In Vietnam!" He was dragged out of the room, but he managed to repeat his plea three more times. He later served 60 days in jail.

In April 1967, Peck marched with hundreds of thousands of people in New York City, as Martin Luther King Jr. led the antiwar rally. On April 28, Peck attempted to crash the 1967 Montreal Expo by performing a sit-in on stage to protest the war, but he failed in his attempt to get arrested. In October 1967, Peck took part in the famous "Stop the Draft Week" as a speaker in New York City who introduced draft-card burner David Miller on stage, while also demonstrating in support of hundreds of youths as they burned their draft cards. On October 21, Peck was one of 683 demonstrators arrested for performing civil disobedience at the famous March on the Pentagon. In jail that night he spoke with fellow inmates linguist Noam Chomsky and author Norman Mailer. Peck appeared in Mailer's 1968 award-winning book on the protest, The Armies of the Night: History as a Novel, the Novel as a History.

On December 5, during the second "Stop the Draft Week," Peck was arrested along with 263 other demonstrators outside an induction center in New York City. He was arrested along with Dr. Benjamin Spock and poet Allen Ginsberg. In 1968 Peck briefly joined students during their takeover of Columbia University, and was gassed and clubbed at the notorious beatings during the Democratic Convention in Chicago. In 1969, Peck spoke out against burning draft files, but still supported those arrested for doing so. He was arrested on August 6, 1969, outside the office of the Secretary of Defense for reading antiwar quotations. He was one of four people arrested, along with WRL members Edward Gottlieb and Bent Anderson, as well as Barbara Reynolds. Peck took part in the massive moratorium demonstrations on October 15 and November 15, which gathered hundreds of thousands of people.

On March 19, 1970, Peck was one of 182 demonstrators arrested for obstructing government operations at Manhattan's Armed Forces Examining & Entrance Station, during nationwide, decentralized protests against the war. Peck was arrested that day along with draft file burner Jerry Elmer, who later recorded the arrest in his book Felon for Peace: The Memoir of a Vietnam-Era Draft Resister. On April 24, 1971, Peck joined the massive march on Washington that over 750,000 people took part in. On May 3, the first day of the May Day demonstrations in D.C., Peck was arrested along with 7,200 demonstrators in the single largest mass arrest in history, ending with over 13,000 arrested between May 3 and May 5.

On October 26, he was arrested at the "Evict Nixon" protest in Washington, D.C., along with nearly 300 people. He was arrested outside the White House with 104 other demonstrators on November 9, during the two-week "Daily Death Toll" demonstrations, where activists performed die-ins to dramatize the continuation of Vietnamese deaths from American bombing. Peck was arrested in D.C. on April 15, 1972, for performing a sit-down that resulted in 240 arrests.

On May 22, Peck was among 224 demonstrators arrested for performing civil disobedience during the "People's Blockade" at the Pentagon. On June 10, Peck was arrested in New Jersey with 36 other demonstrators for being involved in the "People's Blockade" campaign, that was conducted at navy ship yards to prevent ammunition from being sent to Vietnam. In August 1972, Peck was injured by a tear gas canister hitting him above the eye, and was hospitalized during an anti-war rally in Miami at the Republican National Convention.

On October 1, 1974, Peck was one of a dozen people arrested at the UN for setting up a tiger cage replica, protesting the mistreatment of Vietnamese political prisoners by U.S.-backed forces. Beginning in 1974, Peck became involved in the Amnesty Campaign, that aimed to protect the rights of deserters and COs during the war. On March 1, 1975, Peck was one of 62 demonstrators arrested for engaging in sit-downs during a tour of the White House in protest against President Ford's conservative amnesty plan. This marked the largest arrest on White House grounds up to that time. Peck attended the last major anti-war rally in New York City on May 11, 1975, when more than 50,000 people filled up Central Park.

=== Anti-Nuclear Movement: 1970s-80s ===
Following the Vietnam demonstrations in the 1970s, there was a revival in the anti-nuclear movement, which Peck took a major part in. In 1973 and 1974, Peck was part of several smaller demonstrations against nuclear testing by France. In 1974 and 1975, he joined Japanese delegates in NYC in protesting nuclear weapons. In 1975, he attended the first two organized demonstrations against the government's first strike nuclear policy. Throughout 1976, Peck was heavily involved in the Continental Walk for Disarmament and Social Justice, a nine-month march with 20 routes covering 34 states. Peck joined the Southern leg of the march that launched from New Orleans on April 4.

The southern leg members, consisting mostly of Japanese Monks and poor blacks, were arrested six different times while marching through the south. Peck was present and arrested at four of these: Birmingham, Alabama; Rocky Mount, NC; New Bern, NC; and Ahoskie, NC. The last day of the Continental Walk for Disarmament and Social Justice was in Washington, D.C., on October 18, attended by 700 people. Peck joined the "Procession of Death" to the Pentagon, where he and 52 other people were arrested for laying coffins on the steps of the building.

On October 12 and November 17, 1976, Peck joined in protesting China's resumption of nuclear tests. In the summer of 1977, Peck and American poet Millen Brand traveled to Japan and joined the march from Nagasaki to Hiroshima, the most famous feeder route of the thirteen involved in the Japanese Peace Walk. Peck and Brand attended numerous meetings with a variety of groups, spoke with government officials, and were the leading speakers at every event for the 30-day march. When Peck returned home from the Japanese Walk, he shared his experiences in a tour through the U.S., sponsored by the WRL and the Mobilization for Survival, one of the largest coalitions of antinuclear groups.

His tour concluded in Colorado, where he joined a meeting hosted by Rocky Flats National Action Committee (RFNAC), an anti-nuclear group opposed to the major nuclear bomb plant in Rocky Flats, CO. At the meeting Peck was the first out-of-state person to endorse the RFNAC's rally at Rocky Flats for April 29, 1978. Peck was one of 6,000 people demonstrating at Rocky Flats. After the rally, he was one of 150 people who launched a 14-hour sit-down on the railroad tracks leading to the plant. Although Peck was only on the tracks for the first day, the sit-down was sustained for several months.

Peck returned to Rocky Flats for a second major rally on August 6, where he sang a Japanese peace song he learned during the Japanese Walk. On August 9, he was one of 79 people to perform a Die-In, along with Allen Ginsberg and Daniel Ellsberg, at the Rocky Flats plant, resulting in all of them being arrested. He returned to Rocky Flats again on April 29, 1979, along with 15,000 demonstrators, and he joined the sit-down on the tracks with 250 others, for which he was arrested for.

During the Special Session on Disarmament at the United Nations in New York City in the spring of 1978, Peck joined in the major actions launched by the Mobilization for Survival. On May 27, Peck joined over 10,000 demonstrators in a march on the UN. On June 12, he was arrested along with 380 other demonstrators at the US Mission to the UN for employing civil disobedience during the Sit-In for Survival, one of the largest mass arrests in New York City history. Later in June, Peck demonstrated for the third time at the Seabrook plant in New Hampshire. On October 16, the opening day of the Arms Bazzar in Washington, Peck joined a picket line to protest the manufacturing of military weapons.

On February 12, 1979, during the trial of the "White House 11," Peck held up a giant banner in court that read: "NO NUCLEAR WEAPONS/NO NUCLEAR POWER USA OR USSR." He then led a march to the White House, where he was one of 22 persons arrested for performing a sit-down.

When the near-meltdown almost occurred at Three Mile Island in March, the anti-nuclear movement expanded dramatically. Only two days later, when Peck marched in an antinuclear demonstration in New York City, he was amazed that a thousand bystanders joined.

In the pouring rain on April 21, he marched with over a thousand people in a protest to shut down the Consolidated Edison's Indian Point nuclear reactor. On May 6, Peck participated in the massive Washington demonstration that over 120,000 persons participated in, led by Ralph Nader. On June 3, 1979, over 45 major demonstrations took place across the US, as part of Europe's International Days of Protest. Peck was one of 560 people arrested that day for occupying the site at the Shoreham Nuclear Power Plant on Long Island, after the largest rally that day was attended by 15,000. A major antinuclear concert was held in September for several days, with performances by bands such as Tom Petty and Bruce Springsteen.

On September 23, Peck joined over 200,000 people in Manhattan for the concluding rally, marking one of the largest antinuclear rallies up to that time. Peck found one of the most significant actions to be the "Wall Street Action" on October 29, the 50th anniversary of the Stock Market Crash, since it brought the fight to the financiers of the nuclear industry. That day, Peck was one of 1,045 demonstrators arrested, along with David Dellinger and Daniel Ellsberg, for attempting to block the entrances of the stock market exchange building.

On April 28, 1980, Peck marched with 1,200 demonstrators to the Pentagon, where he and nearly 600 others were arrested for blocking the entrances of the building, including Daniel Ellsberg, Dr. Benjamin Spock, David McReynolds and Grace Paley. Peck also took part in the largest antinuclear rally held in New York City on June 12, 1982. With one million people in attendance, it marked the single largest demonstration in the country for any cause. The rally marked the peak of antinuclear movement, and led to dramatic changes in the political realm.

Following the largest rally in history, a massive civil disobedience campaign was set for June 14 at the UN. That day over 1,600 persons were arrested for blocking the entrances of the five nations possessing nuclear weapons, making it the single largest arrest in the city's history. Peck was part of the first group arrested that day outside the U.S. Mission to the U.N. This was possibly Peck's last arrest in his life, having been arrested nearly 60 times overall.

=== Prison Movement of the 1970s ===
The Prison Movement, stemming from the radical protests of the 1960s, was crystallized by the Attica Prison riot in September 1971. It ended with New York state officials sending in reinforcements to crush the riot, resulting in dozens of deaths. On October 2, 1971, in memory of the deaths from Attica, protests were held at nearly 20 prisons nationwide. Peck attended the largest protest that day at Danbury, Connecticut, Prison, where he had been held during WWII. Peck rallied with 2,500 people at Kenosia Park, before hundreds rallied at the prison. On October 24, Peck joined a thousand people, 1971, protesting an award dinner for Governor Rockefeller, who was responsible for the decision to move in on Attica prison.

A wave of prison strikes swept the nation in 1972. Prisoners at Danbury prison went on strike due to poor working conditions and slave wages. On March 2, 1972, Peck joined activists in picketing outside Danbury prison. On October 7, 1974, Peck joined 800 people outside Cooper Union to protest Gov. Rockefeller's planned speech, over his orders during the Attica riot. Peck criticized the young people at the rally who later broke the windows at Chase Manhattan Bank, which became a big part of the story the following day in the New York Post.

Peck revealed the pop-culture of the prison movement found in movies and books. Peck wrote a review in WIN magazine in 1972, covering Leon Dash's book, The Shame of the Prisons. He also enjoyed the 1970 publication of An Eye for an Eye, and the 1972 pamphlet by draft resister John Bach and Mitch Snyder (reprinted by the War Resisters League from the May 1972 issue of Liberation magazine), Danbury: Anatomy of a Prison Strike because it showed how the Vietnam protests were intertwined in the prison strikes.

Peck wrote in the 1974 WIN magazine that his two favorite prison plays were The Jail and Attica. Peck became involved in the case of former boxer Rubin "Hurricane" Carter, who was sentenced to prison in the 1960s, after reading his 1974 book, The Sixteenth Round: From Number 1 Contender to Number 45472. On February 1, 1975, Peck joined a march from the Trenton, New Jersey State House to the Trenton Prison in support of Carter, hosted by the NJ Workers Committee Against Police Repression.

=== Death Penalty Movement: 1970s ===
From 1972 to 1976, the U.S. had a de facto moratorium on capital punishment, but in 1976 it became legal again after Gregg v. Georgia. Peck took part in one of the dozen southern vigils held on Christmas Eve, 1976, against the death penalty. Peck joined the candlelight vigil in New Orleans, one of the dozen cities to hold vigils orchestrated by the Southern Coalition on Jail & Prisons. Peck joined the national "Easter Witness Against Executions" protests in April 1977, organized by the Southern Coalition on Jail & Prisons. On April 9, Peck marched with 3,000 activists in Atlanta, Georgia, to end the death penalty and protect the "Dawson 5." On April 10, Peck attended a similar rally in New York City, where he heard famed activist attorney William Kuntsler.

On March 9, 1977, Peck protested North Carolina Governor James Hunt at a New York City Symphony Orchestra performance because the Governor refused to intervene in the notorious international case of the Wilmington 10. On March 18, 1978, Peck joined 8,000 people in a march on the White House to free the Wilmington 10. On April 5, 1979, Peck joined a night vigil against the scheduled Alabama execution of John Louis Evans, which ended in celebration when the judge granted a last minute reprieve.

On August 11, 1979, Peck was one of 66 demonstrators arrested for violating a court order by attempting to cross a bridge in Reidsville, Georgia, in order to reach Georgia State Prison on the other side. Peck was arrested there along with Dick Gregory to show support for the "Reidsville Six," who were accused of starting a prison riot the year before.

On November 23, 1979, Peck was one of 24 persons arrested at a protest against capital punishment at the Supreme Court building in D.C., sponsored by People Against Execution (PAX). The rally was called "Florida Day" to represent the more than 100 prisoners facing the death penalty in the state. A series of "mock executions" were conducted upon the 24 people risking arrest, who sat in a hand-made electric chair and pretended to be executed. The 24 bodies were carried across the street and placed on the steps of the Supreme Court, where they performed die-ins until their arrests.

=== Labor activism in the 1970s ===
Peck continued his 1930s labor activism in the 1970s. On October 25, 1972, he protested alongside a dozen Asian-American organizations against employment discrimination, outside the headquarters for the International Ladies Garment Workers Union, for running advertisements that promoted the idea the idea that Japanese imports threatened American jobs. Peck openly supported more radical rank-and-file unions because they could win victories in wildcat strikes, but he protested what he considered to be a more conservative union, the United Steelworkers.

Peck joined 200 people in protesting the United Steelworkers convention in Atlantic City, NJ, on September 23, 1974, over the union's "experimental negotiating agreement" with U.S. Steel Corporation, which prohibited any type of strike. Peck took part in the first international demonstration against multinational corporations on Earth Day, March 21, 1975. Launched by the Coalition Against Global Enterprises (CAGE), half a dozen protests were held within the U.S., and protests were held internationally in Brussels, Norway, Stockholm and Tokyo. Peck protested in New York City outside the ITT building, where he held signs quoting Anthony Sampson's 1973 book, The Sovereign State of ITT.

On June 4, 1975, Peck went to what he said was the largest Wall Street protest he attended up to that time of 12,000 union demonstrators. The Municipal Labor Committee, representing the major municipal unions, organized the rally against the 1975 crisis budget proposed by the Mayor of New York City, which threatened thousands of municipal jobs. The demonstration was associated with an economic attack by the union, which threatened to withdraw millions of dollars from First City National Bank if the crisis budget went through.

Peck protested J.P. Stevens in the 1970s, an anti-union company that paid significantly lower wages than most factory jobs. On September 12, 1978, four men were arrested inside a J.P. Stevens store for standing in front of scab products and wearing shirts that read: "Boycott J.P. Stevens." This was noted as the first "T-In." On November 17, another dozen people, including Peck and David McReynolds, were arrested inside the New York City J.P. Stevens location. Peck's group had all their charges dropped December 7.

By the early 1970s, Peck considered Cesar Chavez of the United Farm Workers (UFW) to be one of the greatest leaders in nonviolent resistance. Peck joined weekly pickets for six years in support of UFW's grape and lettuce boycotts. Peck met Caesar Chavez and spoke with him at length in May 1970, during a mass march from Baltimore to D.C. to protest The Pentagon's purchases of scab grapes to export to troops in Vietnam. The Baltimore-to-Washington march marked the first one of its kind on the east coast.

Peck traveled to Pacific Grove, California, to attend the three-day War Resisters League 50th anniversary conference in August 1973. When the conference ended Peck was one of 65 persons to join a motorcade to Fresno, in order to challenge the anti-mass picketing injunction against the UFW, which resulted in more than 400 arrests a week earlier. Early in the morning on August 8, Peck, along with Joan Baez, Daniel Ellsberg and others, picketed near a big ranch without problems. Peck's group then went to the second vigil at the courthouse where the injunction was debated.

Peck joined 5,000 people protesting at Union Square in NYC on May 10, 1975, for the second annual UFW week, which was observed in more than 50 cities. Some time prior to the rally, UFW singled out Gallo wine to boycott, along with the continuing boycott of grapes and lettuce, and speeches at Union Square were made by Cesar Chavez, Dorothy Day and Bella Abzug. On June 16, 1977, Peck joined 100 UFW members in picketing outside the Connecticut Mutual Life Insurance Company in Hartford, Connecticut. The insurance company owned a significant number of citrus fruit groves along the west coast and had stalled previous negotiations for a union contract.

Peck protested New York City's subway fare increases in the 1970s, explaining it unfairly made money off the working class. When the subway fare increased from 30 cents to 35 cents in 1971, Peck walked through the subway gates without paying and encouraged others to do the same. He was arrested for this in 1972 and was fined $25. In 1975, NYC's subway fare nearly doubled to 50 cents, and Peck joined the first day of protests on September 2, 1975, and walked through the gates without incident and held gates open for other people to walk through without paying. He was arrested three times in 1976 for continuing protests against the fare increase.

=== FBI Court Case ===
In 1975, Gary Thomas Rowe Jr. testified that he was a paid FBI informant in the Klan, and that on May 14, 1961, the KKK had been given 15 to 20 minutes to attack Freedom Riders without interference by the police. Peck filed a lawsuit against the FBI in 1976, seeking $100,000 in damages. In 1983, he was awarded $25,000, and by this time was paralyzed on one side after a stroke. Peck had been working for Amnesty International until his stroke.

=== Death ===
In 1985, Peck moved into a nursing home in Minneapolis. He died there on July 12, 1993, at age 78.

== Selected works ==
- Peck, James, "The Ship That Never Hits Port", in Cantine, Holly R.; Rainer, Dachine, Prison etiquette: a guide for incarcerated individuals, Bearsville, N.Y. : Retort Press, 1950. (reprinted 2001, Carbondale : Southern Illinois University Press). Cf. pp. 46–71.
- Peck, James (1958). We Who Would Not Kill. L. Stuart.
- James Peck, ed. (1960). Sit Ins: The Students Report (PDF). CORE. Archived from the original (PDF) on May 5, 2010.
- Peck, James (1962). Freedom Ride. New York: Simon & Schuster. OCLC 890013.
- Peck, James (1969). Underdogs vs. Upperdogs. Canterbury, NH: Greenleaf Books.

== See also ==
- List of peace activists
- Timeline of the civil rights movement
