= Barbara Leonard Reynolds =

American writer

Barbara Leonard Reynolds (born Barbara Dorrit Leonard; Milwaukee, Wisconsin, June 12, 1915 – February 11, 1990), was an American author who became a Quaker, peace activist and educator.

In 1951, Reynolds moved with her husband to Hiroshima where he conducted a three-year study on the effects of radiation on children who had survived the first atomic bomb. She and her family then became peace activists, sailing around the world to protest nuclear weapons. In the early 1960s, she traveled around the world with atomic bomb survivors to show world leaders, first-hand, the horrors of nuclear warfare. In 1965, she established the World Friendship Center in Hiroshima, Japan in order to introduce international visitor to atomic bombing sufferers (hibakusha) so that they could fully convey their experience of nuclear war to the global community. In 1975, Reynolds established the Peace Resource Center at Wilmington College to spread awareness of the nuclear threat and the experiences of hibakusha to the American public.

After this, she continued her peace and anti-nuclear activism, and after 1978, in California, she helped to resettle Cambodians fleeing Pol Pot, among other humanitarian pursuits.

== Early life ==
She was born Barbara Dorrit Leonard in Milwaukee, Wisconsin, the only child of Dr. Sterling Andrus Leonard, a Professor of English and Education at the University of Wisconsin and prolific author of books on English composition and literature and Minnetta Florence Sammis, an educator who evaluated the safety of new toys for children. Barbara's paternal grandmother, Eva Leonard, was a syndicated daily columnist in over 200 newspapers during World War II and later wrote advice to the lovelorn under the name Elizabeth Thompson.

Barbara was fifteen years old — and one month from graduating from high school — when her father, 43, a popular English teacher at the University of Wisconsin, drowned in Lake Mendota. A colleague from Cambridge University, Dr. I. A. Richards, 38, had come to Madison to meet Dr. Leonard and learn more of Leonard's original perspectives on English usage. Dr. Richards had spoken at the University of Wisconsin the night before and the two were spending the afternoon canoeing together. The canoe capsized and after two hours in the cold water, Leonard lost his grip on the canoe and sank. Dr. Richards was later rescued exhausted and in shock. Dr. Leonard's death was the top story in both The Capital Times in Madison, Wisconsin and the Chicago Daily Tribune. The failure of lifeguards on shore to see the overturned canoe and save the two professors became a local scandal, resulting in an investigation. Dr. Leonard's body was never recovered.

In 1935, Barbara married Earle L. Reynolds, and they had three children: Tim (1936), Ted (1938) and Jessica (1944). In 1951, Dr. Reynolds was sent by the Atomic Energy Commission to Hiroshima to conduct a three-year study on the effects of radiation on children who had survived the first atomic bomb (1951–54). Barbara and the family went with him. They lived in Nijimura, an Army occupation base nearby. During their three years there, he designed and built a 50-foot (15 m) yacht, Phoenix of Hiroshima.

== Peace activism ==
In 1954, Reynolds and her family sailed around the world in the Phoenix of Hiroshima, a yacht that Earle had designed. In 1958, the family (minus their eldest son Tim) and a crew member, Niichi (Nick) Mikami, arrived back in Honolulu. Across the dock was a 35-foot (11 m) yacht, the Golden Rule, in which four Quaker men had attempted to protest American nuclear testing in the Pacific. They were arrested under an injunction put into effect while they were at sea, forbidding American citizens to enter the 390,000-square-mile (1,000,000 km^{2}) area of the ocean where the weapons were being tested. On July 2, 1958, the Reynolds family and Nick sailed the Phoenix into the test zone and were stopped 65 miles (105 km) by the American Coast Guard ship Planetree. Dr. Reynolds, as captain, was put under arrest. He was ordered to sail the Phoenix to Kwajalein Atoll, from which he, Barbara and Jessica were flown back to Honolulu by Military Air Transport Service plane for Earle's trial. Unable to find a third man to help Ted and Nick, who had stayed with the Phoenix, Barbara flew back to Kwajalein and the three sailed the yacht back to Hawaii, a trip which took sixty days. After Reynolds' conviction and its reversal after a two-year appeal, the family completed their circumnavigation, which made Mikami the first Japanese yachtsman to sail around the world.

On arriving in Hiroshima to an enthusiastic welcome, the Reynolds family were surprised at the appreciation expressed by hibakusha (literally, explosion-affected people), the atomic bomb survivors, for their protest against nuclear weapons. Walking along a Hiroshima street one day, Barbara was stopped by a hesitant woman in full kimono. The woman pulled up her sleeve to show gnarled keloid scars typical of atomic bomb burns. With tears in her eyes she thanked Barbara for giving her a voice to share the cry of her heart, "No More Hiroshimas", with the world. Barbara often mentioned this in talks, saying, with tears in her own eyes, "it had never occurred to us to represent anyone but ourselves." Barbara committed herself to speaking out against nuclear weapons and for disarmament.

In 1961, to protest USSR nuclear testing, the family sailed to Nakhodka and were stopped within the 12-mile (19 km) limit claimed by the USSR by a Soviet Coast Guard boat. The captain and several other officers boarded the Phoenix. Although the Reynolds were able to have a two-hour discussion about peace with him, Captain Ivanov would not accept the hundreds of letters from Hiroshima and Nagasaki survivors, begging for peace. Upon their return to Hiroshima, Barbara decided to bring a survivor from Hiroshima to take the letters personally to show to government leaders around the world and to the United Nations. When asked why hibakusha, Barbara reportedly said, "Because they are the prophets of this present age." A committee of Hiroshima leaders choose two survivors to represent the city, a 29-year-old woman, Miyoko Matsubara, a schoolgirl at the time of the bomb, and an 18-year-old student, Hiromasa (Hiro) Hanabusa, who had been orphaned by the bomb as a baby.

Peace Pilgrimage, 1962

She organized the Peace Pilgrimage in 1962, accompanying the two hibakusha around the world as they shared their personal experiences of atomic war, appealing to world leaders to ban nuclear weapons. Over five months, the three Peace Pilgrims traveled through 13 countries, including the Soviet Union, appealing for nuclear disarmament and receiving a warm and open reception from public leaders, churches, schools and the media. During their six weeks in the United States, they spoke to 187 groups and met with many leaders in Washington D.C. and at the United Nations. In Geneva the three attended the 1962 Disarmament Conference.

Two years later Barbara organized the World Peace Study Mission, taking 25 survivors of both cities plus 15 interpreters to every nuclear nation, including the USSR. Teachers went to meet with teachers, doctors with doctors and at the UN they appealed to the U.S. government to return Hiroshima – A Documentary of Atomic Bombing, to the Japanese, who had made it. (It had been impounded and classified by the U.S. military forces soon after the occupation of Japan.) Dr. Tomin Harada, a physician who dedicated his life to the continuing medical needs of the hibakusha due to delayed radiation sickness, and who had named a species of rose he developed after Barbara, wrote in one of his two books about her, "Through Barbara's World Peace Study Mission the survivors of the atomic bomb were introduced to the world and the anti-nuclear movement gained strength."

Upon their return, Earle and Barbara divorced.

== World Friendship Center and Hiroshima Nagasaki Memorial collection ==
Barbara envisioned a place visiting foreigners could stay, where they could meet and hear the stories of survivors. Dedicated in 1965, the World Friendship Center has established lines of communication between hibakusha and the world through various peace efforts. Barbara was its first director, Dr. Harada the first chairman of a board of ten non-political persons and an international board of honorary sponsors. Dr. Albert Schweitzer, accepted a position as a sponsor in one of the last letters he wrote. Tens of thousands of people have stayed at WFC since its founding.

She spent the next 13 years getting to know the people who had experienced the bomb. They lived in shacks overhanging Hiroshima's seven rivers. They were self-conscious about their scars and never appeared in public during the day, ostracized by newcomers to the city who wanted to forget the past. Many had disfigurements or compromised immune systems which prevented them from getting or keeping jobs. Barbara developed "Hibakusha Handicrafts," finding people to teach them to make simple coin purses and other things which she would bring to the States to sell for them. She often visited the Hiroshima A-Bomb Hospital where the survivors were still succumbing to lethal radiation sickness years after the war had ended.

Upon the death of Hiro Hanabusa's grandmother, Barbara adopted him and put him through college in the States. An orphan and a survivor of Hiroshima, Hiro's prospects for marriage were slight. Barbara negotiated with the parents of Atsuko, to arrange a marriage for Hiro with the woman he loved. Hiro, himself an orphan, fathered seven children.

In August 1975, Barbara found a home for the 3,000 books and documents she had gathered regarding Hiroshima, Nagasaki, nuclear weapons and peace in both Japanese and English. During an academic symposium, "Hiroshima and Nagasaki After Thirty Years" on the Wilmington (Ohio) College campus in August 1975, the Hiroshima Nagasaki Memorial Collection was inaugurated. It is the largest collection of materials related to the bombings of Hiroshima and Nagasaki outside Japan.

== Later life ==
Barbara with adopted Vietnamese family: Dao Phuong Mai and children Ahn (Annie), Diep and Yen (Jenny) c. 1983

Barbara moved to Long Beach, California in 1978. Almost immediately she was caught up in the needs of Cambodian refugees fleeing "the Killing Fields" of Pol Pot. She helped them get settled in what they hoped would be their temporary country, finding them housing, employment, education and giving them moral support.

During this time she was working to persuade senators to let a badly-wounded young Vietnamese woman, Mai Phuong Dao, out of Ho Chi Minh City. Dao worked in an orphanage in Saigon but when the American troops pulled out, the Viet Cong entered the city and took over the orphanage as a military barracks. Dao, fearing for the lives of the five half-American orphans, took two of them into her own home, with a baby of her own. When the family, including Dao's own child, were finally permitted to come to America, Barbara housed them in her own apartment.

Indignant at having to pay taxes for war, Barbara deliberately lived below the poverty level so she wouldn't owe taxes. She vowed she would never have an easier life than the survivors of the bomb had, nor than the Cambodian refugees around her from the war in South-East Asia.

== Author ==
Coming from a family of writers, Barbara, her husband Earle, all three of their children and two of their nine grandchildren would become published authors

Barbara's writing closely mirrored her family's adventures. After her first book, a murder mystery, Alias for Death, she wrote books for each of her children: Pepper, about Tim and his raccoon; Hamlet and Brownswiggle, about Ted and his hamsters; and Emily San, about an American girl living with her family in Japan. She wrote Cabin Boy and Extra Ballast about a brother and sister sailing with their family from Japan to Honolulu. After the family had sailed around the world in a yacht designed and built by her husband, Barbara switched back to adult non-fiction to co-author All in the Same Boat with him.

== Humanitarian awards ==
For her contributions to the welfare of survivors, including the founding of the World Friendship Center, Barbara was presented with a key to the city of Hiroshima in 1969 and in 1975 was made an honorary citizen by Mayor Araki, the first woman so honored and only the second American, the first being Norman Cousins for raising the funds to bring 25 "Hiroshima Maidens" to the States for surgery for their severe injuries from the atomic bomb.

Barbara received one of 15 Wonder Woman awards in 1984. Fifteen women, all over 40, were chosen for trying to right wrongs "people don't want to talk about," according to Koryne Horbal, Executive Director of the Wonder Woman Foundation, a non-profit organization founded in 1981. "They are role models for the next generation, they are living history."

== Death ==
In 1990 she died suddenly in Wilmington, Ohio. Memorial services were held in Wilmington, in Long Beach, in Philadelphia and in Hiroshima. Every Japanese TV network and major newspaper covered her life and passing. Dr. Tomin Harada, the doctor who performed surgery on Mai Phuong Dao, attended the service in California with his wife. He wrote afterward, "Her obituary in the Los Angeles Times was smaller than those carried in Japanese newspapers. Although the American people are known for their generosity, it seemed that they had not understood Barbara." When he returned to Hiroshima, he organized a memorial service for her there.

Survivors designed a monument to Barbara, featuring her statement, "I, too, am a hibakusha." It was unveiled in the Hiroshima Peace Park (Ground Zero) on June 12, 2011, which would have been her 96th birthday.

== Bibliography ==
- Alias for Death (mystery). New York: Coward-McCann (1950)
- Pepper. New York: Charles Scribner's Sons (1952)
- Hamlet and Brownswiggle (1954)
- Emily San (1955)
- Cabin Boy and Extra Ballast (1958)
- All in the Same Boat (with Earle Reynolds, 1962)
- The Story of Leopons (with Hiroyuki Doi, 1967)
- The Phoenix and the Dove. Japan (1986)
- Cry to Your Heart's Content (unpublished)
- Dear My Mother (unpublished)
- Upwind (unpublished)
- A Walk Through the Peace Park (unpublished)
- Sailing into Test Waters in Reweaving the Web of Life: Feminism and Nonviolence (by Pam McAllister, 1982)
- A Little Toad Shall Lead Them? (Reynolds, Barbara, with Shaver, Jessica Reynolds, 1991)

== Articles regarding Barbara ==
=== English ===
- Harada, Tomin, MD. Moments of Peace: Two Honorary Hiroshimans: Barbara Reynolds and Norman Cousins. Garvier Products Co., Ltd. Hiroshima, 1998. (Translated by Robert L. Ramseyer)
- Linner, Rachelle Linner. "The Symbolic American: Barbara Reynolds," in City of Silence: Listening to Hiroshima. Maryknoll, New York: Orbis Books, 1995.
- Mehren, "Winners of Wonder Woman Awards: Profiles in Courage." Los Angeles Times, November 15, 1984.
- Parrish, Beth. "Barbara Reynolds: Friend of the Hibakusha," in Lives That Speak: Stories of 20th-century Quakers. Quaker Press of Friends General Conference, 2004
- Sherman, Kris. "Longtime pacifist: Spotlight has dimmed, but Barbara Reynolds still working for peace in her own quiet way," Independent Press-Telegram (Long Beach, CA) December 12, 1979
- Totten, Sam and Totten, Martha Wescoat. "Barbara Reynolds," in Facing the Danger: Interviews with Twenty Anti-Nuclear Activists. Trumansburg, New York: The Crossing Press, 1984.

==== By family ====
- Reynolds, Earle. "We Crossed the Pacific the Hard Way," Saturday Evening Post, May 7, 14 and 21, 1955.
- Reynolds, Jessica, Jessica's Journal. New York: Henry Holt & Co., 1958. Eleven-year old's diary account of sailing from Hawaii to New Zealand in the Phoenix.
- Reynolds, Earle, "The Forbidden Voyage," The Nation, 15 November 1958.
- Reynolds, Ted. "Voyage of Protest," Scribble, Winter, 1959.
- Reynolds, Earle, The Forbidden Voyage. New York: David McKay Company, Inc., 1961. Non-fiction. The Reynolds family's protest voyage against American nuclear testing in the Pacific and aftermath, 1958-1960.
- Reynolds, Jessica. To Russia with Love (Japanese translation). Tokyo: Chas. E. Tuttle Co., 1962. The Reynolds family's protest voyage against Soviet nuclear testing in the U.S.S.R.
- Shaver, Jessica Reynolds. "After the flood, a mission to 'rescue' Dad," (Long Beach, CA) Press-Telegram, January 14, 1982.
- Shaver, Jessica Reynolds. "Healing Wounds and Playing Games," Moody Magazine, February 1982.
- Shaver, Jessica Reynolds. "Let us spare children our nuclear fears," (Long Beach, CA) Press-Telegram, December 1, 1983.
- Reynolds, Jessica Shaver (sic). "Amer-Asians: a call for compassion," Long Beach (CA) Press-Telegram, October 21, 1984.
- Shaver, Jessica Reynolds. "IRS quietly moves on a white-haired woman of peace," Long Beach (CA) Press-Telegram, August 13, 1986.
- Shaver, Jessica. "To the man who mugged my mother," The Orange County Register, March 17, 1988.
- Shaver, Jessica Reynolds. "An Education I Wouldn't Trade," Home Education Magazine, May–June 1991.
- Shaver, Jessica Reynolds (with Barbara Reynolds). "A Little Toad Shall Lead Them?" Quaker Life, June 1991.
- Shaver, Jessica. "Breaking the Bitterness Barrier," Friends Journal, August 1991.
- Shaver, Jessica Reynolds. "Hiroshima: August 6, 1990 in memory of my mother" (poem), Japan Times, May 2, 1995.
- Shaver, Jessica. "Growing up in Hiroshima," The Orange County Register, August 6, 1995.
- Renshaw, Jessica Shaver, New Every Morning. Enumclaw, WA: Pleasant Word 2006.
- Reynolds, Jessica. To Russia with Love (English original): Wilmington, OH: Peace Resource Center, Wilmington College, due out in 2010.

=== Japanese ===
- Harada, Tomin, MD. Moments of Peace. Two Honorary Hiroshimans: Barbara Reynolds and Norman Cousins. Keiso-shobo Publishers, 1994.
- Kotani, Mizuhoko. Pilgrimage to Hiroshima. Chikuma-shobo Publishers, 1995.
- Harada, Tomin, MD. Haha-to-Kodemiru (A6): Hiroshima-ni-Ikite, Aru Geka i no Kaiso (Meditations of a Surgeon), (Publisher?), 1999.
- Yamakawa, Takeshi. Kibo-o-Katari, Kibo-o-Manabu: Korekara-no Heiwa Kyoiku (Talking Hope, Learning Hope). Kai-sho-sha Publishers, 2005.

== Peace Activism Centres ==
- World Friendship Center - founded August 6, 1965 (twenty years after the atomic bombing of Hiroshima)
- Peace Resource Center, Wilmington College, Wilmington, OH - founded by Barbara Reynolds in August 1975 to house the largest collection of materials related to the bombings of Hiroshima and Nagasaki outside Japan (Peace Resource Center Barbara Reynolds Memorial Archives)
- Swarthmore College Peace Collection - Committee for Non-Violent Actions Records, 1958–1968
- Swarthmore College Peace Collection - Archival holdings related to Barbara Leonard Reynolds
