= William R. Huntington =

American architect (1907–1990)

William Reed Huntington (1907–1990) was an American architect who represented the American Friends Service Committee (AFSC) to the United Nations. He directed a program outlining the AFSC.

During World War II, Huntington co-directed a camp in Big Flats, N.Y. for conscientious objectors. From 1947 to 1949, he co-commissioned relief operations in Europe representing the American Friends Service Committee.

In 1958, to protest the United States' nuclear testing in the South Pacific, Huntington and his fellow Quakers sailed to the nuclear test site. The under-sized vessel, aptly named Golden Rule, is considered to be the first watercraft to attempt the disruption of a nuclear test.

Golden Rules's crew soon found themselves under arrest and shortly thereafter sentenced to sixty days in jail. However, the arrests attracted global media coverage and inspired similar actions by members of the Vancouver-based Don't Make a Wave Committee, which later became known as the Greenpeace Committee.

From 1961 to 1963, Huntington directed assistance operations in Tunisia and Algeria for refugees displaced by the French-Algerian War.

== Death ==
Huntington died of lung cancer at his home in Norwich, Vermont.
