= John H. Sammis =

American songwriter

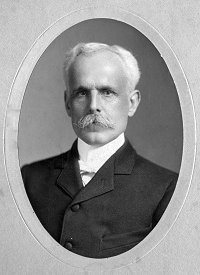
John H. Sammis

John H. Sammis (1846–1919) was the writer of the Christian hymn "Trust and Obey" with Daniel B. Towner in 1887. Sammis also wrote the hymn "He's a Friend of Mine".

== Biography ==
Sammis was born in 1846, in Brooklyn, New York. He was a businessman who became a Presbyterian minister. He taught at the Bible Institute of Los Angeles.

Sammis wrote over 100 hymns. Most of them can be categorized as "songs of trust" and "songs of obedience". They were compiled by T. C. Horton (a founder of Bible Institute of Los Angeles) and R. A. Torrey in 1918.

Sammis died in Highland Park, Los Angeles on June 12, 1919, and was buried at Forest Lawn Memorial Park in Glendale.
