= War Resisters' International =

International anti-war organisation

- Logo incorporating the broken rifle symbol
- Abbreviation: WRI
- Established: March 1921; 105 years ago
- Founders: Kees Boeke; Helene Stöcker; Wilfred Wellock
- Founded at: Bilthoven, Netherlands
- Origins: Bilthoven Meetings
- Publication: The Broken Rifle
- Website: wri-irg.org/en
- Remarks: purpose: Anti-militarism
- Formerly called: Paco

War Resisters' International (WRI) is an international anti-war organisation headquartered in London, with members and affiliates in over 40 countries.

== History ==
War Resisters' International was founded in Bilthoven, Netherlands in 1921 under the name Paco, which means "peace" in Esperanto. WRI adopted a founding declaration that has remained unchanged:

War is a crime against humanity. I am therefore determined not to support any kind of war and to strive for the removal of all causes of war.

It adopted the broken rifle as its symbol in 1931.

Many of its founders had been involved in the resistance to the First World War: its first Secretary, Herbert Runham Brown, had spent two and a half years in a British prison as a conscientious objector. Two years later, in 1923, Tracy Dickinson Mygatt, Frances M. Witherspoon, Jessie Wallace Hughan, and John Haynes Holmes founded the War Resisters League in the United States.

Notable members include Dutch anarchist Bart de Ligt, Quaker Richard Gregg and Tolstoyan Valentin Bulgakov. WRI attracted some of the world's greatest pacifist thinkers and activists, including George Lansbury, Mahatma Gandhi, Bertrand Russell, Bayard Rustin, Martin Niemöller and Danilo Dolci. The group had a close working relationship with sections of the Gandhian movement. In January 1948, Gandhi attended a preparatory meeting for the World Pacifist Meeting he called, at the behest of WRI, and which eventually took place in December 1949. It took the form of 50 international pacifists meeting with 25 of Gandhi's close associates in an "unhurried conference" in Santiniketan, West Bengal.

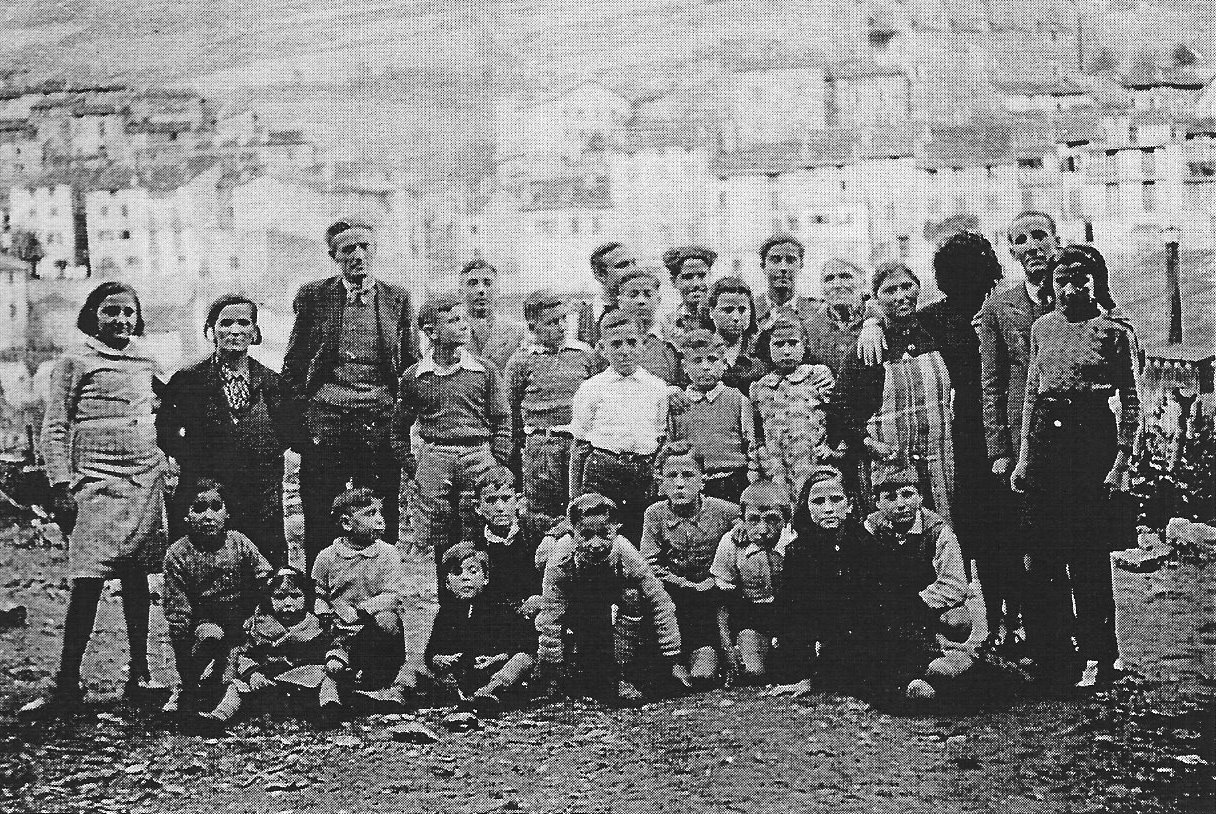
Refugees from the Spanish Civil War at the War Resisters' International children's refuge at Prats-de-Mollo in the French Pyrenees, some time between 1937 and 1939. The warden of the home, Professor José Brocca is standing third from left in the photograph.

In the 1930s and 1940s, WRI helped to rescue people from persecution in Fascist Italy and in Nazi Germany under Adolf Hitler. WRI found many people safe homes with WRI members in other countries. One of the leaders of the Norwegian branch of WRI (FmK), Olaf Kullmann, was arrested by the German cccupation forces for his pacifist agitation; he was sent to the Sachsenhausen concentration camp, where he died in 1942.

The Internationale der Kriegsdienstgegner/innen (IDK) is a German section of War Resisters' International. It is an organization of anti-militarists, pacifists and conscientious objectors. The office of the IDK is located in Berlin-Hermsdorf (until March 2005 in the Mehringhof). The IDK archive is located in the Archive active (Hamburg). It was established in 1947, in Hamburg, as the successor of the Bundes der Kriegsdienstgegner (BdK), which continued the tradition of the radical Kriegsdienstgegner society. Theodor Michaltscheff was a founding member and IDK chairman.

During the Cold War, WRI consistently sought out war resisters in the Soviet bloc: first individuals, and later groups. After the 1968 invasion of Czechoslovakia, WRI organised protest demonstrations in four Warsaw Pact capitals.

Daniel Ellsberg's attendance at a talk by Randy Kehler (as Kehler was preparing to submit to his sentence for draft resistance) at the WRI's 13th Triennial Meeting, held at Haverford College in August 1969, was a pivotal event in Ellsberg's decision to copy and release the Pentagon Papers. (It was Ellsberg's release of the Pentagon Papers which led President Nixon to create a group of in-house spies, who undertook the ill-fated Watergate break-in, which led to Nixon's resignation).

In 1971, when Pakistani troops were blockading what was then East Pakistan, WRI launched Operation Omega to Bangladesh. More recently, the International Deserters Network associated with WRI has offered support for people resisting the Gulf War of 1991 and, on a much larger scale, the wars in the Balkans, where it was also engaged with several other peace organisations in an experiment in international nonviolent intervention, the Balkan Peace Team.

In 1988, a WRI advert was cited as one of the reasons for the seizure of an edition of the Weekly Mail in South Africa, after the banning of the local End Conscription Campaign.

The WRI office in London has supported three programmes: work on conscientious objection, supporting nonviolent movements against war and countering youth militarisation.

== Organisation ==
War Resisters' International is a network of member groups. An international conference takes place at least once every four years.

The Chair has been elected at international conferences (Assembleys) or by postal vote in advance of the international conference. Since the office of chair was created in 1926, chairs have been:

- Fenner Brockway (1926–1934)
- Arthur, Lord Ponsonby (1934–1937)
- George Lansbury (1937–1940)
- Herbert Runham Brown (1946–1949)
- Harold Bing (1949–1966)
- Michael Randle (1966–1973)
- Devi Prasad (1973–1975)
- Myrtle Solomon (1975–1986)
- David McReynolds (1986–1988)
- Narayan Desai (1989–1991)
- Jørgen Johansen (1991–1998)
- Joanne Sheehan (1998–2006)
- Howard Clark (2006–2013)
- Christine Schweitzer (2014–2019)

The office of Chair has been abolished at the 2019 Assembly meeting in Bogotá, Colombia, and the former responsibilities of the Chair are now shared between the members of the executive committee.

== Quotes ==
In 1929, at a meeting of the Council of War Resisters in Zurich, chairman Fenner Brockway stated:

The object of the War Resisters International was not to escape war service but to put an end to war. War had its roots in capitalism and imperialism, and would only be removed by the construction of a new social and international order. Pending that, the resistance psychology and a resistance organization was necessary in order to prevent war.

At the same time, Albert Einstein, who collaborated with the organization, stated, when asked what his attitude would be in the event of another war:

I should unconditionally refuse every direct or indirect war service and try to induce my friends to adopt the same attitude, irrespective of the general opinion of the causes of war.

== See also ==
- List of anti-war organizations
- List of peace activists
- Nonviolence
- Pacifism
- Antimilitarism
- War resister
- War Resisters League
