= War Resisters League Peace Award =

Since 1958, the War Resisters League, the pacifist group founded in 1923, has awarded almost annually its War Resisters League Peace Award to a person or organization whose work represents the League's commitment to radical nonviolent action.

== Laureates ==
Year	Awardee	Speaker at ceremony	Notes
1958	Jeannette Rankin		
1959	AJ Muste	Martin Luther King Jr.	
1960		Fenner Brockway and Bayard Rustin	
1961	Tracy Mygatt and Frances M. Witherspoon	Murray Kempton and Bayard Rustin	
1962	Jim Peck	Douglas Campbell and Bayard Rustin	
1963	Dorothy Day	Evan Thomas and AJ Muste	
1964	James Bevel and Diane Nash	A. Philip Randolph	
1965	Bayard Rustin	Milton Mayer	
1966	Norman Thomas	Mulford Sibley	
1967	Barbara Deming	Ralph DiGia	
1968	The Resistance		
1969	Ammon Hennacy		Dinner was canceled
1970	People Resisting within the Military		
1971	Majorie Swann	Lanza del Vasto	
1972	Ann Upshure		Recognition only; not an official award
1973	No dinner		
1974	Daniel Berrigan	Allen Ginsberg	
1975	Dave Dellinger		
1976	Julius Eichel		
1977	Marion Bromley and Ernest Bromley		
1978	David Berkingoff and Prafulla Mukerj		
1979	Igal Roodenko		
1980	Grace Paley		
1981	Ralph DiGia		Recognition only; not an award
1982	Bent Andreson		
1983	Virginia Eggleston, Thomas Grabell, and Ashley King		
1984	Larry Gara		
1985	Barbara Reynolds		
1986	Plowshares Disarmament Community		
1987	Dorie Bunting		
1988	Don Luce, Vietnam Veterans Against the War (VVAW), John McAuliff, David Truong, Bob Eaton, and Lady Borton		
1989	Children of War		
1990	Esther Pank and Riley Bostrom		
1991	Gulf War Resisters		
1992	War Tax Resisters, especially activists in Colrain, Massachusetts, An Act of Conscience		
1993	WRL’s 70th Anniversary		
1994	No dinner/award		
1995	No dinner/award		
1996	The Living Theatre		
1997	Bob Moses		
1998	Odetta, Charlie King, People's Voice Cafe, and Pete Seeger		
1999	David McReynolds		
2000	Committee for the Rescue and Development of Vieques, Puerto Rico		
2001	Kate Donnelly and Clay Colt		
2002	Christian Peacemaker Teams		
2003	September Eleventh Families for Peaceful Tomorrows		
2004	Fernando Suarez del Solar of Military Families Speak Out		
2005	Karl Bissinger and Ralph DiGia		
2006	Women Resisting War from within the Military: Diedra Cobb, Anita Cole, Kelly Dougherty and Katherine Jashinski	Presented by Ann Wright	
2007	Center for Constitutional Rights and Torture Abolition Survivors and Support Coalition International Posthumous lifetime achievement award: Grace Paley		
2008	Kali Akuno and Shana Griffin representing grassroots groups working to rebuild New Orleans	A concert with Steve Earle, Allison Moorer, Stephanie McKay, Red Baraat Festival, and Jan Bell and the Cheap Dates	
2009	Dennis Brutus, Women of Zimbabwe Arise (WOZA), and Gays and Lesbians of Zimbabwe (GALZ) Grace Paley Lifetime Achievement Award: Bill Sutherland, Pan-Africanist and WWII Conscientious Objector		
2010	Kathy Kelly		
2011	Afghan Youth Peace Volunteers		Award was declined. The group didn’t want to distract from the people in Afghanistan needing support and a voice.
2012	Asma Mohammed, Suez Port Worker and Labor Leader		
2013	Joan Baez, Harry Belafonte, Daniel Ellsberg Ralph DiGia Award: Joanne Sheehan, New England WRL		
2014	No Peace Award Ralph DiGia Award: Ruth Benn		
2015	Mumia Abu-Jamal		
2016	Jannat Al Ghezi		
2017	Mariame Kaba Grace Paley Lifetime Achievement Award: Rasmea Odeh		
2018	Corrina Gould and The Peace Poets Grace Paley Lifetime Achievement Award: Mandy Carter (activist)		
2019	Highlander Research and Education Center		
