= Federal Correctional Institution, Sandstone =

Low-security prison in Minnesota, US

Coordinates: 46°06′31″N 92°51′13″W

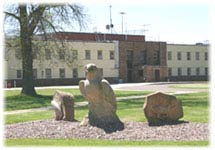
- Interactive map of Federal Correctional Institution, Sandstone
- Location: Sandstone, Pine County, Minnesota
- Status: Operational
- Security class: Low-security
- Population: 1,337
- Managed by: Federal Bureau of Prisons

The Federal Correctional Institution, Sandstone (FCI Sandstone) is a low-security United States federal prison for male offenders in Sandstone, Minnesota. It is operated by the Federal Bureau of Prisons (BoP), a division of the United States Department of Justice.

FCI Sandstone is located approximately 100 miles (160 km) northeast of Minneapolis/St. Paul and 70 miles (110 km) southwest of Duluth.

== Notable inmates (current and former) ==
†Inmates who were released from custody prior to 1982 are not listed on the Bureau of Prisons website.

=== Celebrities and sports figures ===
Inmate name	Register number	Photo	Status	Details
Tim Allen	04276-040		Released from custody in 1981 after serving 28 months under his birth name, Timothy A. Dick.	Comedian and television actor; pleaded guilty in 1979 to drug trafficking after being found in possession of 1.4 pounds of cocaine at Kalamazoo/Battle Creek International Airport in Michigan.
Mike Danton	10096-111		Transferred to Kingston Penitentiary in Canada in 2009 after serving 4 years; later released that year.	Former National Hockey League player and Canadian citizen; convicted in 2004 of conspiracy to commit murder for attempting to hire a hitman to kill his agent, David Frost.
Con Errico	13274-053		Released from custody in 1985 after serving 4 years.	Former horse jockey; convicted in 1980 of racketeering for fixing races and contempt of court for refusing to provide grand jury testimony.
Fetty Wap	71943-509		Served 3 years of a 6-year sentence; Released on January 8th 2026 after serving 3 years.	American rapper, singer, and songwriter; pleaded guilty to charges of conspiracy to distribute and possess controlled substances in 2022.

=== Political prisoners ===
Inmate name	Register number	Photo	Status	Details
James P. Cannon	Unlisted†		Released from custody in 1945 after serving 18 months.	National Secretary and Labor Secretary of the Socialist Workers Party, convicted under the Smith Act in Minneapolis in 1941.
Farrell Dobbs	Unlisted†		Released from custody in 1945 after serving 18 months.	National Secretary and Labor Secretary of the Socialist Workers Party, convicted under the Smith Act in Minneapolis in 1941.
Vincent R. Dunne	Unlisted†		Released from custody in 1945 after serving 16 months.	Socialist Workers Party member and leader in the International Brotherhood of Teamsters Local 544, convicted under the Smith Act in Minneapolis in 1941.
Igal Roodenko	Unlisted†		Released from custody in 1947 after serving 20 months.	American pacifist, conscientious objector, and member of the War Resisters League during World War II. Imprisoned for refusing to serve in the military or perform mandatory Civilian Public Service in lieu of military service.

=== Others ===
Inmate name	Register number	Photo	Status	Details
Manuel Arturo Villarreal-Heredia	95354-198		Scheduled for release on April 4, 2031.	Manuel Arturo Villarreal was arrested along with Javier Arellano Félix “El Tigrillo” on August 14, 2006 in international waters and was transferred to San Diego, California, United States, accused of trafficking hundreds of tons of drugs to that country, ordering some homicides and pay millions of dollars in bribes to authorities. In 2008 he was sentenced by the Federal Court for the Southern District of California to a sentence of 30 years in prison and to pay a fine of 5 million dollars.
Xengxai Yang	16979-089		Serving a 14-year sentence. Scheduled for release in 2031.	Bank robber sentenced for his role in a robbery of a credit union, apparently armed with a short-barreled rifle. Yang was convicted of armed bank robbery, brandishing a short-barreled rifle during a crime of violence, and possession of a short-barreled rifle.
Cecil Price	Unlisted†		Sentenced to six years by Supreme Court case United States v. Price; served four-and-one-half years before being released in 1974.	Deputy sheriff of Neshoba County, Mississippi and member of the White Knights of the Ku Klux Klan; convicted of civil rights violations in the murders of Chaney, Goodman, and Schwerner in 1964.
David Brankle	07411-028		Was serving a 21-year sentence; released on June 18, 2023.	Serial bank robber; pleaded guilty in 2004 to robbing 43 banks in six states in 2002 and 2003, stealing over $175,000; Brankle's story was featured on the CNBC television program American Greed.
Marc Dreier	70595-054		Serving a 20-year sentence; scheduled for release in 2025. Currently in the custody of RRM New York.	Disbarred attorney; pleaded guilty in 2009 to securities fraud, wire fraud and money laundering for bilking hedge funds and investors of over $700 million. Dreier's story was featured on the CNBC television show American Greed.
Rigoberto Yanez-Guerrero	71652-279		Was serving a 16-year sentence; released from custody on September 11, 2019.	Chief operator of the Arellano-Felix drug cartel in Mexico City between 1995 and 2001; directed the shipment of 5 to 10 tons of cocaine from Colombia to Mexico en route to the United States.
Anton Joseph Lazzaro	59637-509		Sentenced to 21 years, scheduled for release in 2039.	Minnesota political activist who sex-trafficked five minors.
Joshua Ryne Goldberg	63197-018		Released from custody on April 1, 2024.	Posed as someone connected to the terrorist group ISIS in an attempt to provoke terrorist attacks.
Mohamed Osman Mohamud	73079-065		Serving a 30-year sentence; scheduled for release in 2036.	US citizen from Somalia; convicted in 2013 of attempting to use of a weapon of mass destruction for trying to detonate what he thought was a car bomb supplied by undercover FBI agents posing as members of Al-Qaeda at a Christmas tree lighting in Portland, Oregon in 2010.
James Weiss			Currently serving a 5 1/2 year prison sentence; due to be released in August 2028	Politically connected Illinois-based business who is also the husband of former Illinois state legislator Maria Antonia "Ton" Berrios and son-in-law of former Cook County Assessor and Chairman of the Cook County Democratic Party Joseph Berrios. Would be convicted in a bribery case which also involved two Illinois state legislators Terry Link and Luis Arroyo. On October 11, 2023, Weiss would be sentenced to 5 1/2 years in prison. Weiss has since been serving his sentence at the Minnesota-based federal prison facility and is not due to be released until August 2028.

== See also ==
- List of U.S. federal prisons
- Federal Bureau of Prisons
- Incarceration in the United States
