= Committee for Nonviolent Revolution =

US pacifist organization

The Committee for Nonviolent Revolution (CNVR) was a pacifist organization founded in Chicago at a conference held on February 6 to 9, 1946. Many of the founding members were conscientious objectors who had served time in prison or in Civilian Public Service camps for their refusal to fight in World War II. They included Dave Dellinger, George Houser, Lew Hill, Ralph DiGia, and Igal Roodenko. Other members included Larry Scott, Alexander Katz, and A.J. Muste.

The activists, having been radicalized by their experiences during the war, were dissatisfied with the War Resisters League and other, more traditional pacifist organizations, such as the Fellowship of Reconciliation. They announced that "the time has come for radical elements from the groups devoted to war resistance, socialism, militant labor unionism, consumer cooperation, and racial equality to attempt to come together in a common program of revolutionary action."

The CNVR promoted civil disobedience, and it opposed the formation of the United Nations, picketing outside the Waldorf Astoria Hotel in 1946. The group also published a number of bulletins and managed to sponsor another conference, whose theme was Radicalism in the Next Five Years, from August 8 to 10, 1947. However, the wide variety of views held by the members, ranging from pacifism to anarcho-syndicalism, made effective organization difficult. By 1948, the group was essentially inactive, and many of its members had regrouped to form Peacemakers.

Former members of the CNVR also went on to found listener supported public radio stations in the Bay Area, including KPFA.

== See also ==
- List of anti-war organizations
