= War resistance in the United States =

War activities by north american citizens

War resistance in the United States refers to efforts by individuals and groups to oppose, avoid, or refuse participation in warfare conducted by the United States or military service on its behalf. War resistance has taken many forms throughout American history, including conscientious objection, draft resistance, draft evasion, desertion, tax resistance, anti-war activism, and organized political opposition to particular wars.

Resistance to military service has existed since the colonial era, particularly among religious groups such as Quakers, Mennonites, and Brethren who opposed participation in war on grounds of conscience. During periods of conscription, including the American Civil War, World Wars I and II, the Cold War, and the Vietnam War, some Americans sought exemption from military service as conscientious objectors or resisted the draft through legal and illegal means.

War resistance became especially visible during the Vietnam War, when opposition to conscription contributed to a broader anti-war movement. Methods of resistance included applications for conscientious objector status, refusal to report for induction, draft-card burning, and emigration to countries such as Canada.

== Forms of war resistance ==
- Conscientious objection
- Draft resistance
- Desertion
- Tax resistance
- Anti-war activism

== History ==
=== Colonial era and early United States ===
Religious opposition to military service existed in North America before the founding of the United States. Quakers, Mennonites, and other peace churches often sought exemptions from compulsory military service based on religious beliefs.

=== Civil War ===
Resistance to the Union draft increased following the passage of the Enrollment Act of 1863. Opposition to conscription led to protests and, in some cases, violent unrest, most notably the New York City draft riots of July 1863, which remain among the deadliest episodes of civil disorder in United States history.

=== World War I ===
The Selective Service Act of 1917 provided exemptions for members of recognized religious groups whose beliefs prohibited participation in war. Conscientious objectors were often assigned to noncombatant military duties, although some objectors refused all forms of military service and faced imprisonment or other penalties.

=== World War II ===
During World War II, the Selective Training and Service Act of 1940 expanded provisions for conscientious objectors. Many objectors performed alternative civilian service through the Civilian Public Service (CPS) program, which assigned participants to work in conservation, public health, mental health institutions, and other civilian projects considered important to the national interest.

=== Vietnam War ===
The Vietnam War produced the largest war-resistance movement in United States history. Millions of men were subject to the draft, and resistance took the form of conscientious objection, deferment strategies, refusal of induction orders, draft-card burning, and emigration abroad.

=== Post-Vietnam era ===
Although the United States ended active conscription in 1973, war resistance continued through anti-war movements opposing conflicts such as the Gulf War, the Iraq War, and the War in Afghanistan. Some members of the armed forces have also sought discharge as conscientious objectors based on religious, moral, or ethical beliefs.

== See also ==
- Copperhead (politics)
- Aftermath of World War I
- American popular opinion on invasion of Iraq
- Canada and Iraq War Resisters
- Canada and the Vietnam War
- Conscription in the United States
- Criticism of the war on terror
- Emigration from the United States
- Foreign Policy of the United States
- Gulf War syndrome
- Legality of the Iraq War
- List of Iraq War Resisters
- Loss of Strength Gradient
- Mennonite
- New York Draft Riots
- Oil Campaign of World War II
- The Oil Factor
- Timeline of United States military operations
- United States non-interventionism
- United States v. Burns
- Vietnam Veterans Against the War
- War Resisters' International
- War Resisters League Peace Award
- War Resisters Support Campaign
