= Fifth Avenue Vietnam Peace Parade Committee =

The Fifth Avenue Vietnam Peace Parade Committee was a coalition of organizations which coordinated events opposing the Vietnam War in the mid-1960s. It coordinated its constituent groups to stage anti-war parades, rallies, and "peace-ins" primarily in New York City. Named after Fifth Avenue in Manhattan, it was based on 17th Street near Union Square. In 1967, they organized a rally and march with the Spring Mobilization against the War in Vietnam which featured Martin Luther King Jr., Stokely Carmichael, Benjamin Spock, and Dave Dellinger in Central Park. At the start of 1968, the committee included more than 100 groups.

Leader Norma Becker was a member of the established War Resisters League. Chairman David Dellinger later became known as one of the Chicago Eight.
