= Christine Schweitzer =

German pacifist

Christine Schweitzer (born 1959) is a German pacifist whose PhD was as a peace researcher. In 2009, she completed her doctorate on interventions in the former Yugoslavia at Coventry University under the supervision of Andrew Rigby.

In addition to her work as a peace researcher, she is active as a practitioner in the field of civil conflict transformation and in the peace movement.

== Life ==
Christine Schweitzer was born in 1959 in Hamburg. She studied ethnology as well as prehistory and early history in Göttingen and Cologne from 1978 to 1987, graduating with a Master of Arts (M.A. phil.) degree. Subsequently, she was politically active in the Federation of Nonviolent Action Groups – Grassroots Revolution (FöGA) and worked at the "Graswurzelwerkstatt" (Grassroots Workshop) in Cologne until 1992. In 1988 and 1989, she was involved in founding the Bund für Soziale Verteidigung (Association for Social Defense) (BSV).

During the 1990s, she focused on conflicts in the former Yugoslavia through various projects, including as a co-founder of the international Balkan Peace Teams. From 1995 to 1998, she was employed as a scientific advisor under contract by the State Chancellery of Düsseldorf in the "Foreign Relations" department; in this role, she supported the state government in tasks such as developing a training program for peace specialists within the framework of the emerging Ziviler Friedensdienst (Civil Peace Service). Schweitzer served as Executive Director of the BSV for the first time from 1998 to 2000 and has also been employed by the Institute for Peace Work and Nonviolent Conflict Resolution (IFGK) since 2001. Concurrently, she began working (2000–2008) as Research Director and later Programme Director for the international non-governmental organization (NGO) Nonviolent Peaceforce.

From 2010 to 2012, she primarily conducted commissioned studies and twice served as Interim Programme Director for Nonviolent Peaceforce. Since October 2012, she has worked concurrently as a research associate for the IFGK and—until her retirement in March 2025—also served as Executive Director of the BSV. She is also a long-standing editor of FriedensForum, a publication issued by the Peace Cooperative Network (Netzwerk Friedenskooperative). Her various volunteer activities in the peace movement and peace research included serving on the boards of War Resisters’ International, the journal Wissenschaft und Frieden, the Arbeitsgemeinschaft für Friedens- und Konfliktforschung (Working Group for Peace and Conflict Research, AFK), and the BSV. She is also involved with the Platform for Civil Conflict Transformation and the Archiv aktiv (Hamburg). From 2014 to 2019, she served as Chair of War Resisters' International (WRI).

== Publications ==
=== As Author ===
- (2025) Unarmed Civilian Protection. Lessons for Planning for Social Defence, IFGK AP 29, February 2025, and the German version:
  - (2025) Unbewaffneter ziviler Schutz. Anregungen für die Planung von Sozialer Verteidigung, IFGK AP 30, February 2025
- (2016) with Jörgen Johansen: To Prevent or to Stop Wars: What Can Peace Movements Do? Irene Publishing ISBN 9789188061126
- (2016) Unarmed Civilian Peacekeeping: Effectively Protecting Civilians Without Threat of Violence. Ellen Furnari, Rachel Julian and Christine Schweitzer, Editor: Bund für Soziale Verteidigung, Hintergrund- und Diskussionspapier Nr. 52, September 2016, 24 p.
- (2015) Gewaltfrei gegen Terror. Nichtmilitärische Optionen gegen den Islamischen Staat. / Non-violent Action Against Terror: Non-military Options Against the Islamic State. With essays by Christine Schweitzer and Kristin Williams. Edited by the Association for Social Defense (Bund für Soziale Verteidigung), November 2015.
- (2015) Soziale Verteidigung und Gewaltfreier Aufstand Reloaded. Neue Einblicke in zivilen Widerstand (Social Defense and Nonviolent Uprising Reloaded: New Insights into Civil Resistance). Hintergrund- und Diskussionspapier Nr. 40, February 2015. Bund für Soziale Verteidigung, Minden.
- (2013) Krieg überwinden – hat das halb volle Glas einen Sprung? / Overcoming war – does the half-full glass have a crack? Hintergrund- und Diskussionspapier Nr. 33. Bund für Soziale Verteidigung, Minden, April 2013.
- (2012) with Clemens Ronnefeldt, Karl Grobe-Hagel and Andreas Buro: Syrien zwischen gewaltfreiem Aufstand und Bürgerkrieg. Dossier V des Monitoring Projekts Zivile Konfliktbearbeitung. / Syria between non-violent uprising and civil war. Dossier V of the Civil Conflict Transformation Monitoring Project. Hrsg. Kooperation für den Frieden, Bonn (online).
- (2010) Strategies of Intervention in Protracted Violent Conflicts by Civil Society Actors. The Example of Interventions in the Violent Conflicts in the Area of Former Yugoslavia. 1990–2002. Soziopublishing, Vehrte, ISBN 978-3-935431-17-0 (online; PDF; 1,7 MB).
- (2010) Für eine Welt ohne Rüstung und Militär. Nachdenken über gewaltfreie Alternativen / For a world without armaments and the military. Reflecting on non-violent alternatives.. AP 24, September. IFGK, Wahlenau (online; PDF; 378 kB).
- (2009) Erfolgreich gewaltfrei. Professionelle Praxis in ziviler Friedensförderung. / Successfully Non-Violent: Professional Practice in Civil Peacebuilding. Hrsg. IFA, IFA, Berlin (online).
