= G. Simon Harak =

American Jesuit and peace activist (1948–2019)

The Reverend G. Simon Harak SJ
- Born: April 15, 1948; Derby, Connecticut, US
- Died: November 3, 2019 (aged 71)
- Education: Fairfield University; Jesuit School of Theology at Berkeley; University of Notre Dame
- Occupations: Jesuit priest; theologian; peace activist; author

Ecclesiastical career
- Religion: Christianity (Roman Catholicism)
- Church: Latin Church

G. Simon Harak SJ (April 15, 1948 – November 3, 2019) was an American Jesuit, author, peace activist and professor of theology and Director of the Center for Peacemaking at Marquette University.

From 2003 to January 2007, Harak served as the Anti-Militarism Coordinator of the National Office of the War Resisters League. He also helped found Voices in the Wilderness, which was nominated for the Nobel Peace Prize in 2001, 2002, and 2003. Harak was named "Metro New York Peacemaker of the Year" and "National Peacemaker of the Year" by Pax Christi Metro New York and Pax Christi Long Island in 2005.

Born in Derby, Connecticut, Harak earned his Bachelor of Arts degree from Fairfield University, a Master of Divinity degree from the Jesuit School of Theology at Berkeley, and Master of Arts and Doctor of Philosophy degrees in ethics from the University of Notre Dame. He died on November 3, 2019, of a rare form of dementia.

== Bibliography ==
- Living in the Company of Jesus: A Practical, Scripture-Based Guide to Deepening Your Journey within His Nonviolent Kingdom with Philip J. Harak [2022]
- Nonviolence for the Third Millennium: Its Legacy and Future (editor) [2000]
- Virtuous Passions: The Formation of Christian Character [1994]

== See also ==
- List of peace activists
