= Ralph DiGia =

American activist (1914–2008)

- Born: December 13, 1914
- Died: February 1, 2008 (aged 93)
- Education: City College of New York
- Known for: pacifism
- Spouse: Karin

Ralph DiGia (December 13, 1914 – February 1, 2008) was a World War II conscientious objector, lifelong pacifist and social justice activist, and staffer for 52 years at the War Resisters League.

Born in the Bronx to a family of Italian immigrants (his father was an anarchist barber) in 1914, DiGia grew up on Manhattan's Upper West Side. A 1927 rally for Italian anarchists Nicola Sacco and Bartolomeo Vanzetti set him on the path he would follow for 80 years.

At the College of the City of New York, where he was studying bookkeeping, DiGia signed the "Oxford Pledge," refusing to participate in the coming war. In 1942, when the Selective Service System ordered him to report for induction, he said he was a conscientious objector. But his objections to war were based on ethics, not religion, and the draft board had no category for secular COs. The U.S. Attorney's office referred him to pacifist lawyer Julian Cornell, at the War Resisters League; Cornell lost his case, and DiGia spent the next three years in federal prisons.

At Danbury Federal Correctional Institution in Connecticut, and later at Lewisburg Federal Penitentiary in Pennsylvania, he met other draft resisters, like Dave Dellinger, who some decades later would be a defendant in the Chicago Seven case, and Bill Sutherland, who would move to Africa after the war and eventually become a pan-Africanist advocate for nonviolence. While in prison, DiGia and other COs conducted hunger strikes to compel the prison system to integrate its dining halls. They succeeded. In 1946, along with Dellinger, Igal Roodenko, and others, DeGia helped found the radical pacifist Committee for Nonviolent Revolution.

== Opposition to the Cold War ==
After his release, he joined a New Jersey commune with Dellinger. In 1951, DiGia, Dellinger, Sutherland, and fellow CO Art Emery bicycled from Paris to Vienna, handing out antiwar leaflets as they went, urging Cold War soldiers everywhere to lay down their arms and refuse to fight. In the early 1950s, he left the commune and moved to the Manhattan area that would later be called Soho, where he lived for the rest of his life, and in 1955 he joined the War Resisters League staff as a bookkeeper. The following year he convinced the organization to help him to refuse his war taxes by not withholding federal taxes from his paycheck. In the early 1960s, he was arrested more than once for not taking shelter during the "civil defense" drills. In 1964 he served four weeks in jail in Albany, Georgia (with, among others, the late peace theorist Barbara Deming) in the Quebec-Washington-Guantánamo Peace Walk organized by the Committee for Non-Violent Action.

== Opposition to the Vietnam War ==
During the Vietnam War, DiGia did necessary office work at WRL but also organized demonstrations and counseled draft resisters. In 1971 he was among 13,500 arrested in the May Day antiwar actions in Washington.

== Anti-nuclear work ==
When the Vietnam War ended, WRL took on anti-nuclear work. In 1977, he protested nuclear power at the Seabrook Nuclear Power Station in New Hampshire. In 1978 he was arrested on the White House lawn while he was demanding nuclear disarmament. He was in New York's Central Park in June 1982 when a million people said, "No Nukes!" He was at dozens of demonstrations at the United Nations.

== Later life ==
In the 1990s, he traveled frequently to Bosnia with his wife, Karin DiGia, and worked with her relief agency Children in Crisis, which Karin created, but also continued to demonstrate for peace and justice at home. In 1996, he became a volunteer instead of a paid staffer at WRL, but continued to work there five days a week. In 1998, he was arrested in Washington at WRL's "A Day Without the Pentagon" in 1998 and at the mass protests against the acquittal of the New York City police officers who shot Guinean immigrant Amadou Diallo in 1999. He continued his work at the WRL office until his 93rd birthday, in December 2007. He often said he was even an activist at the ball park: an ardent New York Mets fan, he remained seated, on principle, during the national anthem.

In 1996, the Peace Abbey, the multifaith retreat center in Sherborn, Massachusetts, gave DiGia its Courage of Conscience award "for his example as a conscientious objector and for over forty years of dedicated service at the War Resisters League." In 2005, WRL gave the 40th annual War Resisters League Peace Award to DiGia and his longtime colleague, former photographer Karl Bissinger.

He continued his war opposition, including opposing the Iraq War.

== Death ==
In the winter of 2007-2008, after a fall and hip fracture, he developed pneumonia and died February 1, 2008, at 7:22 AM (2:22 AM GMT)

== Memorials ==
- Ralph DiGia Fund for Peace and Justice
