= Katherine Jashinski =

American conscientious objector

- Born: 1982 (age 42–43); Milwaukee
- Known for: Conscientious Objector

Katherine Jashinski (born 1982) is an American conscientious objector who was the first female soldier to refuse duty in American military operations following September 11, 2001. Katherine was born in Milwaukee, Wisconsin and enlisted in the Army National Guard as a cook (MOS 92G) in April 2002 signing a six-year service contract. She cited a desire to experience military life as a primary reason for enlisting in the Army. In June 2004, she applied for discharge as a conscientious objector. The Army denied her claim a year and a half later. In late 2005, she was ordered to weapons training at Fort Benning in preparation for deployment to Afghanistan at which time she refused and was brought up on charges. In court on May 23, 2006, Katherine was acquitted of the more serious charge of missing movement by design, but pleaded guilty to refusal to obey a legal order. She received a bad conduct discharge and was sentenced to 120 days confinement, with credit for 53 days already served (at Fort Benning), and 20 days off for good behavior. Katherine was released from custody on July 9, 2006. She graduated from the University of Texas at Austin.

== Honors ==
- One of four recipients of the 2006 Peace Award from the War Resisters League.

== See also ==
- Anti-war movement
