= Con Errico =

American jockey (1921–1993)

Personal information
- Born: November 4, 1921 United States
- Died: March 21, 1993 (aged 71) Deerfield Beach, Florida
- Occupation: Jockey

Horse racing career
- Sport: Horse racing
- Career wins: 707

Major racing wins
- Travers Stakes (1949); Gulfstream Park Handicap (1952); Princess Elizabeth Stakes (1958)

Significant horses
- Arise, Crafty Admiral
- Updated on March 13, 2007

Con Errico (November 4, 1921 – March 21, 1993) was an American Thoroughbred horse racing jockey who went to prison after being convicted of race fixing.

Among his noted race wins, Errico captured the 1949 Travers Stakes aboard the future Canadian Horse Racing Hall of Fame colt, Arise and rode Crafty Admiral for part of the 1952 season when the horse was voted U.S. Champion Handicap Male Horse.

After twenty-nine years as a jockey, Errico's career came to an end when he was indicted on race-fixing charges. In his 1980 New York trial in 2nd Circuit Court (United States v. Errico, 635 F. 2d 152), the chief government witness was jockey José Amy who himself would be banned from New York racing for almost twenty-five years for his role in the scandal. Amy testified that Con Errico paid him and other jockeys as much as $7,500 per race to hold back their horses. Convicted, Errico was fined $25,000 and sentenced to 10 years in prison. In poor health, in 1985 he was released from the Federal Correctional Institution in Sandstone, Minnesota.

In 1993, Con Errico was living at Deerfield Beach, Florida, when he suffered a stroke after open-heart surgery and died a short time later on March 21.
