= Tracy Dickinson Mygatt =

American dramatist

- Tracy D. Mygatt, from a 1932 newspaper.
- Born: March 12, 1885; Brooklyn
- Died: November 22, 1973 (aged 88); Philadelphia
- Occupations: Political activist, pacifist
- Known for: Co-founder of the War Resisters League
- Partner: Frances M. Witherspoon
- Relatives: Daniel S. Dickinson (grandfather); John Tracy (great-grandfather)

Tracy Dickinson Mygatt (March 12, 1885 – November 22, 1973) was an American writer and pacifist, co-founder with Frances M. Witherspoon of the War Resisters League, and longtime officer of the Campaign for World Government.

== Early life and education ==
Mygatt was born in Brooklyn, New York, and raised by her widowed mother, Minnie Clapp Mygatt. Her great-grandfather Daniel S. Dickinson and great-great-grandfather John Tracy were both prominent politicians in New York State. Tracy D. Mygatt graduated from Bryn Mawr College in 1909. After some years as a suffrage and labor organizer in Pennsylvania, she and Witherspoon moved to New York City in 1913.

== Career and activism ==
In New York City, Witherspoon and Mygatt joined the Woman's Peace Party, and together edited their publication, Four Lights. They also organized the Socialist Suffrage Brigade, and edited an issue of The Call about suffrage. Mygatt joined Jessie Wallace Hughan and John Haynes Holmes in launching the Anti-Enlistment League in 1915.

Witherspoon and Mygatt continued with peace work after the war, as active members of the Women's Peace Union, and as founders of the War Resisters League in 1923. They were charter members of the Episcopal Pacifist Fellowship when it was founded in 1939. In 1961 they were recognized jointly with the WRL Peace Award.

In 1932, Mygatt ran for the New York State Assembly as the Socialist Party candidate.

=== Campaign for World Government ===
From 1941 to 1969, Mygatt worked full-time for the Campaign for World Government, and was their accredited representative to the United Nations. In 1969, after moving into a retirement home in Philadelphia, she continued to serve as part-time East Coast Secretary of the Campaign for World Government till her death in 1973.

=== Works ===
Witherspoon and Mygatt co-wrote two Biblical novels, The Glorious Company (1928) and Armor of Light (1930), and a play about Vincent van Gogh, Stranger Upon Earth, among other literary collaborations. Mygatt also wrote several plays on her own (Children of Israel, Watchfires, Grandmother Rocker, Good Friday, The Noose, Sword of the Samurai, His Son, Thim Socialists, and Bird's Nest), and published Julia Newberry's Sketch Book: or, The Life of Two Future Old Maids (1934), a biography of her mother and her mother's cousin.

== Personal life and legacy ==
Mygatt lived and worked with Frances M. Witherspoon for over sixty years, in New York City, and later in Brewster, New York and Philadelphia, Pennsylvania. The pair were active in the Episcopal Church. They died within a month of each other, in late 1973, in Philadelphia; Mygatt was 88 years old, and had been in poor health for some time. The couple's papers were donated to the Swarthmore College Peace Collection.
