= Maris Cakars =

American activist of Latvian origin

Maris Cakars (Latvian: Māris Čakars) (1942-1992) is best known as having served as editor of WIN (Workshop in Nonviolence) Magazine, a bi-weekly journal of the nonviolent anti-Vietnam War movement, from 1965 to 1976.

During his leadership at WIN, authors such as Grace Paley, Barbara Deming, Andrea Dworkin, Abbie Hoffman, and many others from the nonviolent Left appeared in its pages. It also published excerpts from secret files stolen by persons unknown from the FBI offices in Media, Pennsylvania. The files were described by the New York Times as "a virtually complete collection of political materials" from the FBI's regional offices, dealing with secret FBI surveillance of student, civil rights and anti-war groups.

According to Tad Richards:

As part of his work with Win, the War Resisters League and the Committee for Non-Violent Action, Cakars helped organize demonstrations at the Pentagon and in New York, including a demonstration at a Manhattan military induction center where Dr. Benjamin Spock was arrested. Cakars managed to get himself arrested by both superpowers in the '70s, and for the same reasons. He was arrested in Moscow by the KGB for passing out anti-war leaflets in Red Square.

His social conscience led him beyond international movements and into the local community. At a time when America seemed to be divided into hostile camps between radical peaceniks and the establishment, Cakars joined the St. Remy Volunteer Department, and rose to the rank of lieutenant. At the time of his death, he was director of publications for the New York City Fire Department.

Cakars was born in Riga, Latvia, which he left with his parents in 1944 to escape Soviet occupation. The family arrived in America in 1949, and he was raised in Oceanside, Long Island, New York. He studied at Lafayette College and Columbia University. He married Susan Kent, and together they had two children, a daughter, Andrea, and a son, Jānis.

After he left WIN in 1976, he lived in Brooklyn. He edited Women's World and managed production for Seven Days magazine, and served as sports editor for the Guinness Book of World Records.

He died of internal hemorrhaging in 1992 at the age of 49.

== See also ==
- War Resisters League
- Committee for Non-Violent Action
