= Orlie Pell =

American pacifist

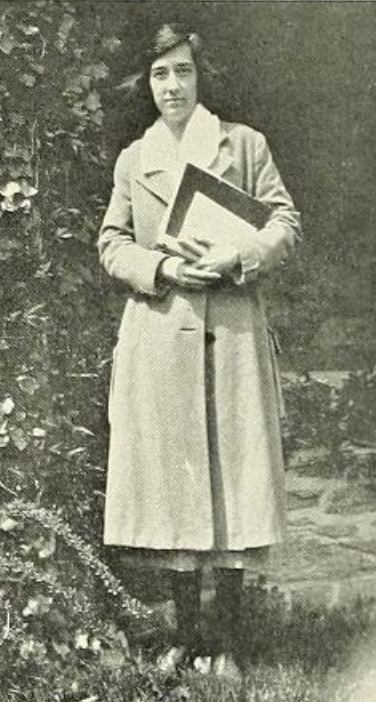
- Orlie Pell, from the 1922 Bryn Mawr yearbook
- Born: Orlie Anna Haggerty Pell; December 13, 1900; Paris, France
- Died: April 11, 1975 (aged 74); Clinton Township, New Jersey, U.S.
- Occupations: Pacifist, philosopher, activist

Orlie Pell (December 13, 1900 – April 11, 1975) was an American pacifist, philosopher, and activist.

== Early life ==
Orlie Anna Haggerty Pell was born in Paris in 1900, and raised in New York City, the daughter of American parents Howland Haggerty Pell and Mary W. Willetts Pell. Her father was a stock broker. She was part of the prominent extended Pell family that included Claiborne Pell, Stephen Hyatt Pell, William Ferris Pell, and Duncan Pell, among others.

Pell attended St. Timothy's School in Catonsville, Maryland, and graduated from Bryn Mawr College in 1922. The following year, she completed a master's degree at the University of Wisconsin–Madison. She completed doctoral studies in philosophy at Columbia University in 1930, with a dissertation titled "Value Theory and Criticism".

== Career ==
Pell was a philosophy professor and trustee at Hollins College in Virginia. Later in life she taught political science at Bryn Mawr College. Her academic writing appeared in journals including Adult Education Quarterly; she also wrote for The Woman Today and other publications on workers' rights.

During the 1930s, Pell was involved with the Association of Unemployed Single Women, and taught at the Summer School for White-Collar Workers in Chicago, and at a Summer School for Office Workers in Oberlin, Ohio, funded by the Federal Emergency Relief Administration (FERA). At the latter, she came under press scrutiny when she admitted that the summer students sang "The Internationale" and other songs associated with communism.

She was the US president of the Women's International League for Peace and Freedom (WILPF) from 1957 to 1961, and attended international meetings of the WILPF in Copenhagen, Birmingham, and Stockholm, and represented the League at the United Nations. She served on the national board of the Young Women's Christian Association (YWCA).

Pell served on the executive board of the National Committee for Sane Nuclear Policy. She was a member of the Civil Defense Protest Committee, with Dorothy Day, Bayard Rustin, Ralph DiGia, Ammon Hennacy, A.J. Muste, James Peck and Judith Malina Beck. Pell was president of the League of Women Voters of Hunterdon County from 1966 to 1967, and president of the Raritan Township Citizens' Housing Corporation, to secure affordable housing for senior residents.

== Personal life and legacy ==
Pell died in 1975, aged 74 years, in Clinton Township, New Jersey. Her papers are archived at Rutgers University. The papers of the Civil Defense Protest Committee are in the Swarthmore College Peace Collection. Video of a 1974 interview featuring Pell, Eleanor G. Coit, and Hilda Worthington Smith, speaking about their experiences at the Bryn Mawr Summer School for Women Workers in Industry, was released on DVD in 2011. The city of Lambertville, New Jersey has a Dr. Orlie Pell Fund for emergency relief.
