= Norma Becker =

American activist (1930–2006)

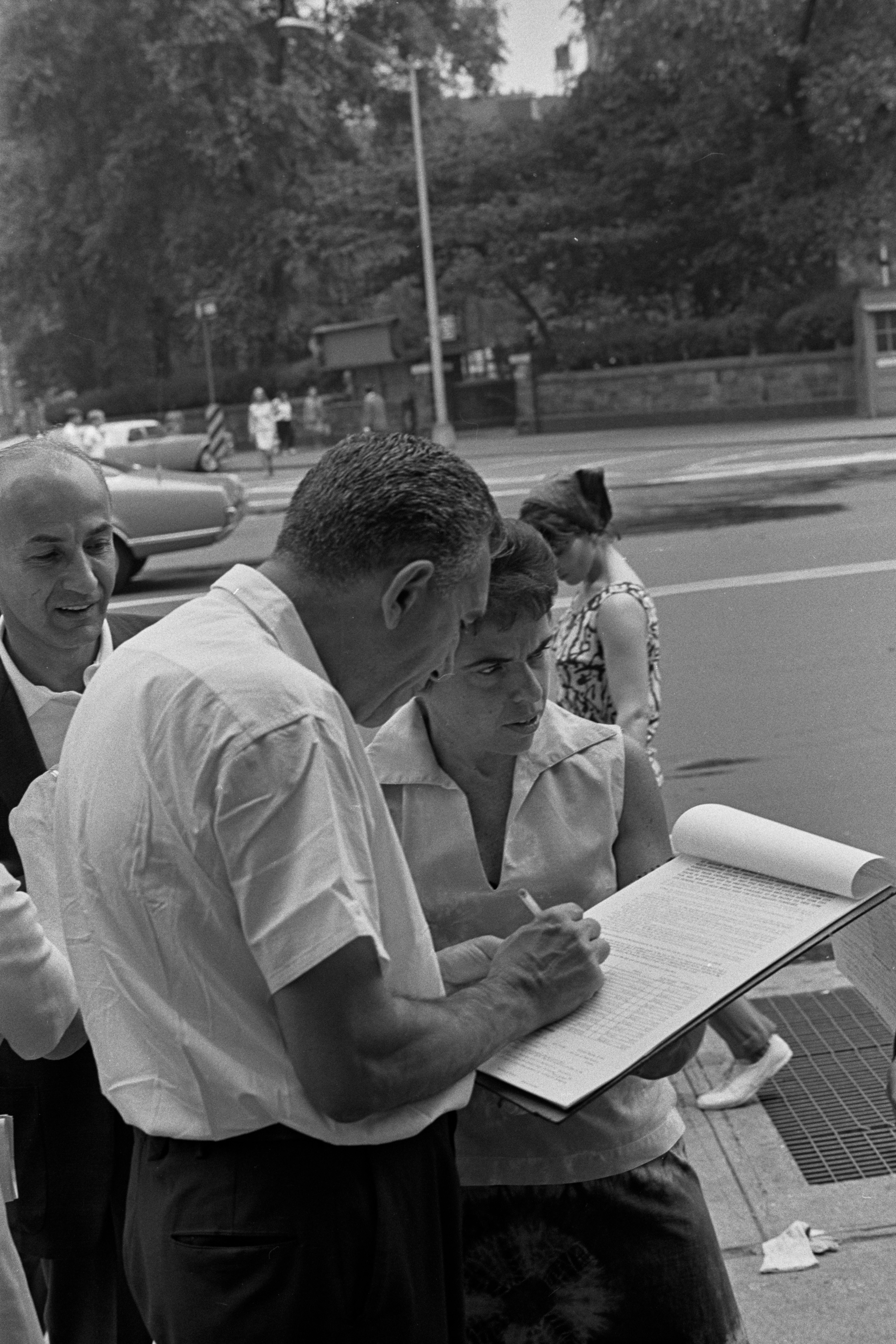
Becker collects signatures for a "Peace Referendum," July 8, 1967

Norma Becker (1930–2006) was an American activist. She was a founder of the Fifth Avenue Vietnam Peace Parade Committee, which drew tens of thousands to protest the Vietnam War, and of the Mobilization for Survival coalition. She served as chairperson of the pacifist War Resisters League from 1977 to 1983.

Born in the Bronx in 1930, Becker graduated from Hunter College in 1951. She began teaching social studies at a Harlem junior high school and received her master's degree in education from Columbia University in 1961. In 1963, as she said later, she was "recruited into the civil rights movement by Sheriff 'Bull' Connor of Birmingham [Alabama]." Appalled by media accounts of Connor's use of dogs to subdue civil rights demonstrators, Becker went South to teach in the summer Freedom Schools. Over the next years, she rose to leadership in the burgeoning movement against the war in Vietnam. In 1965, she helped to start the Peace Parade Committee. In 1970 she was on the working committee of War Tax Resistance, a group that was practicing and advocating tax refusal as an anti-war measure.

In 1977, after the Vietnam War ended, Becker helped create the Mobilization for Survival, which linked the emerging movement against nuclear power to opponents of nuclear weapons and the wider antiwar movement. On June 12, 1982, the "Mobe" drew some 700,000 people to Central Park, in what The New York Times later described as "a boisterous and festive call for the end of the nuclear arms race."

== See also ==
- Vera Williams
