= Seven Days (magazine) =

American alternative news magazine

- August 1978 edition of Seven Days magazine
- Frequency: Irregular
- Publisher: Institute for New Communications, Inc.
- Founder: David Dellinger, Dick Goldensohn, Gwenda Blair
- Founded: 1975
- First issue: March 3, 1975
- Final issue: April 1980
- Country: U.S.
- Based in: New York, New York
- ISSN: 0162-1289

Seven Days was an American alternative news magazine written from a leftist or anti-establishment perspective. Founded by antiwar activist David Dellinger and others, it was published from 1975 to 1980 by the Institute for New Communications, a non-profit organization in Manhattan. The magazine ran without advertising for its first year, and relied heavily on private donors through its final issue.

== Background ==
The first preview edition of Seven Days magazine was published on March 3, 1975. One year later, the Los Angeles Times reported that Seven Days was starting publication as a monthly magazine, which would eventually be published weekly. David Dellinger, a defendant in the Chicago Seven trial, was one of the founders of Seven Days, which aspired to become a mass-circulation news magazine for the American Left. While its format was modeled on Time, Newsweek, and U.S. News, the editors positioned Seven Days as an "alternative, oppositional news magazine".

In media circles, Seven Days was viewed as the successor to the radical Ramparts magazine, which ceased publication in October 1975 due to infighting, and turned over its subscriber list to Dellinger after it folded. Working Papers for a New Society noted that Dellinger, Gwenda Blair, and Dick Goldensohn, who were involved in the original planning of Seven Days, had worked together on the staff of the pacifist Liberation magazine in the early 1970s. Others suggested that the magazine was in the anti-establishment spirit of I. F. Stone's Weekly, as well as The Nation and The New Republic of the 1920s and 1930s.

After publishing "preview" issues to build its subscriber base, Seven Days attempted to move to biweekly publication in 1977. In January 1977, Dellinger told the New York Daily News that the magazine was running without advertising for one year to ensure editorial freedom. According to Dellinger, Seven Days had startup funding from 100 donors who had contributed between $500 and $20,000 each.

== Format and critical reception ==
Seven Days featured national and international news stories incorporating more political opinion and commentary than conventional news weeklies. It also had recurring columns and reviews of arts and culture. While it was "oppositional" in its approach, the editors sought to avoid "the jargon and rhetoric of other leftist publications".

In a widely syndicated review, Newsday media specialist Tom Collins noted in May 1977 that the publication was "backed by a group of individuals associated with the feminist, civil rights, and antiwar movements" and called it a "very clean, well-edited publication with a different point of view and a genuine 'alternative' to the giants." As an example, he cited the magazine's coverage of the cancellation of The Mary Tyler Moore Show, which took a leftist stance "[deploring] the fact that Mary, Ted, Lou Grant and Murray were apolitical and never thought of unionizing."

A review in The Record called Seven Days "an ambitious undertaking" because it was trying to "speak to the Left as a whole" instead of focusing on niche interest groups. Journalist Alan Finder wrote that the magazine was so new, it was still "in the process of finding its voice", taking risks that made it "uneven", but viewed it as "a refreshing new venture, unlike anything else in American journalism."

== Editorial staff ==
In early 1977, the magazine had 13 members of staff, including six editors, working with writers from all over the world. By 1978, members of the Seven Days editorial staff included film editor Peter Biskind, Maris Cakars, Barbara Ehrenreich, Robert Ellsberg, Elizabeth Hess, Alfredo Lopez, Jill Nelson, and many others, in addition to Dellinger.

== Circulation ==
By March 1977, circulation of Seven Days had reached 45,000 subscribers, including 30,000 who had been acquired from the defunct Ramparts, which had 250,000 subscribers at its peak in the 1960s. Goldensohn told Working Papers that their objective was to reach 100,000 subscribers by 1978, while The Record reported that Seven Days needed 200,000 subscribers to break even.

By November 1979, the publication had run out of funds and was unable to pay for printing and computer use. In April 1980, Seven Days published a final "special issue" after raising enough money to cover costs for that issue only. Activist David McReynolds, who had worked with Dellinger at Liberation magazine, later reflected that Seven Days had fallen apart, much as the anti-war movement had collapsed after the Vietnam War.

== Topics ==
The January 1977 issue of Seven Days covered the new Carter administration, including an in-depth analysis of the likely positions it would adopt concerning the economy, foreign policy, and the Justice Department. It included an article by Noam Chomsky exploring the impact that David Rockefeller's Trilateral Commission might have on the new president and his administration, and an interview with Jean-Paul Sartre. The February 1977 issue featured several articles on American steelworkers, including an interview with Edward Sadlowski, a young member of the union's rank-and-file who had tried unsuccessfully to become the leader of the United Steelworkers of America. Lighter topics covered in the first three issues included essays defending rock-and-roll music and describing an interview with Colombian author Gabriel García Márquez.

Poet June Jordan wrote a lengthy essay that was published in the August 1978 issue, "In the Valley of the Shadow of Death", concerning an attack on a Black boy by Hassidic Jews in the Crown Heights area of Brooklyn. In her 1995 book, Civil Wars, Jordan wrote that the magazine “reluctantly published” the story after "an enormous dirty fight, in fact the most disillusioning fight I have ever waged with editors." She said the magazine's cover headline "appalled" her and she accused Seven Days of having lied about how the essay was assigned.

=== H-Bomb satire ===
In 1979, the United States federal government obtained a court order to prevent The Progressive magazine from publishing an article called "The H-Bomb Secret". The editorial team at Seven Days decided to publish its own satirical article titled, "How to Make Your Own H-Bomb", to demonstrate solidarity with The Progressive and to dramatize their defense of free speech. The tongue-in-cheek instructions advised readers to "Never make an A-bomb on an empty stomach" to avoid ingesting plutonium orally. To enrich uranium hexafluoride, the article instructed: "Attach a six-foot rope to a bucket handle. Now swing the rope (and bucket) around your head as fast as possible. Keep this up for about 45 minutes. Slow down gradually, and very gently put the bucket on the floor. The U-235, which is lighter, will have risen to the top, where it can be skimmed off like cream." According to the article, the aerated uranium should then be put into two stainless steel salad bowls and placed in a hollowed-out vacuum cleaner. It was written by Barbara Ehrenreich, Peter Biskind, Jane Melnick, and scientist Michio Kaku.

On April 2, 1979, the publishers of Seven Days sued the federal government, alleging that a U.S. assistant attorney had intimidated its printer into stopping publication of its "H-bomb issue", which was originally scheduled to hit newsstands on March 31. Attorneys for Seven Days, Martin Stolar and William Kunstler, asked Federal Judge Kevin Duffy to issue an order to stop government interference, but Duffy refused after American Press Service of Gordonsville, Virginia, agreed to print the magazine after all. The article was finally published as the April 13, 1979, issue cover story. Excerpts from the Seven Days article were later published in The Washington Post.

In 2009, lawyers for Binyam Mohamed said they believed their client was wrongfully detained at Guantanamo Bay prison for seven years, after having "confessed" to reading the article from Seven Days.
