= Jessie Wallace Hughan =

American activist (1875–1955)

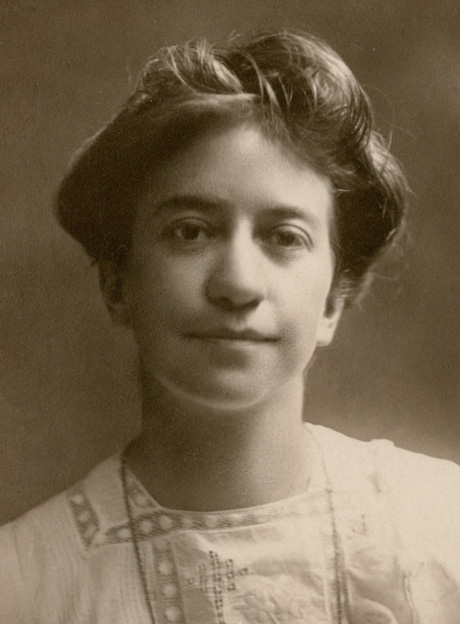
- Hughan c. 1898
- Born: December 25, 1875; Brooklyn, New York, U.S.
- Died: April 10, 1955 (aged 79)
- Education: Barnard College, BA; Columbia University, MA
- Occupation: Educator

Jessie Wallace Hughan (December 25, 1875 – April 10, 1955) was an American educator, a socialist activist, and a radical pacifist. During her college days she was one of four co-founders of Alpha Omicron Pi, a national fraternity for university women. She was the founder and first Secretary of the War Resisters League, established in 1923. For over two decades, she was a perennial candidate for political office on the ticket of the Socialist Party of America in her home state of New York.

== Early life and education ==
Jessie Wallace Hughan was born December 25, 1875, in Brooklyn, New York City. She was the third of four children born to Margaret and Samuel Hughan, who were of Scottish, English, and French ancestry. Her father was an accountant.

Hughan attended grammar school on Staten Island, and then went on to Northfield Seminary, a theologically liberal Unitarian college preparatory school for girls located in Northfield, Massachusetts.

Hughan enrolled at Barnard College in New York City in 1894. In January 1897 she co-founded there with three other students the international sorority Alpha Omicron Pi. In 1898 she graduated, earning her A.B. degree, for which she authored an unpublished senior thesis on "Recent Theories of Profits." An excellent student, Hughan was a member of Phi Beta Kappa, a national honorary society.

After graduation from Barnard, Hughan enrolled in Columbia University, also located in New York City. There Hughan earned her Masters of Arts degree in 1899, writing a thesis entitled "The Place of Henry George in Economics," and her Ph.D. in 1910. Her dissertation was adapted by Columbia University Press and published in book form as The Present Status of Socialism in America, for which the prominent British-born socialist John Spargo wrote the introduction. The book was later reissued by a commercial publisher under a slightly revised title.

== Career ==
Hughan made her professional career as an educator, teaching in a series of public and private schools following her graduation from Columbia with her A.M. degree in 1899. She first taught in schools in Naugatuck, Connecticut and White Plains, New York before returning to New York City in the early 1900s to complete her doctorate. Following her graduate work, she taught in a number of high schools throughout New York City, primarily in Brooklyn. In the 1920s, Hughan was in charge of the English Department at Textile High School, a position which she retained until her retirement from the profession in 1945.

=== Socialist activism ===
Jessie Wallace Hughan joined the Socialist Party of America (SPA) in 1907.

Hughan's primary place in the socialist movement was as an officer of the Intercollegiate Socialist Society (ISS), an independent organization established by author Upton Sinclair in 1905 to provide a venue of topics related to socialism, pro and con, by university students across America. Hughan was elected to the Executive Committee of the ISS in 1907 and served continuously in that capacity until the end of the organization in 1921, continuing in a similar capacity in its successor organization, the League for Industrial Democracy (LID) through 1925. She also served as Vice President of the ISS from 1920 to 1921. Other so-called adult leaders of the ISS during this interval included Morris Hillquit, J.G. Phelps Stokes, Harry W. Laidler, as well as founding father Upton Sinclair.

In 1913, the ISS commissioned Hughan to write a book on the principles of socialism to serve as a text for study and discussion by the various chapters of the organization. The resulting publication, a tome called Facts of Socialism, was an influential text among the young intellectuals who participated in the Intercollegiate Socialist Society's activities, a group which included peace activist Devere Allen, journalist Heywood Broun, researcher and American Civil Liberties Union official Robert W. Dunn, historian Herbert Feis, and publicist Walter Lippmann.

=== Campaigns for electoral office ===
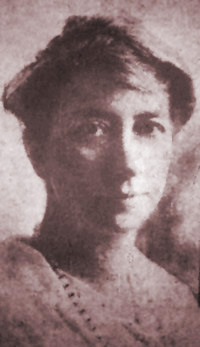
Jessie Wallace Hughan as she appeared in 1919.

For over two decades, Jessie Wallace Hughan was a candidate for public office on the ticket of the Socialist Party of America. Her first foray into politics came in a 1915 bid for Alderman in 1915. It was perhaps the only race in which she ran in which she had a measurable chance of winning. Hughan ran for office not so much intending to win, but rather as a means of advancing socialist ideas to a broader public and to put pressure on elected officials to co-opt and implement ideas from the Socialist Party's political platform. Hughan therefore was unfazed by electoral defeat, instead running for a steadily escalating series of political offices.

Hughan ran on the Socialist ticket for New York State Treasurer in 1918. In 1920, she ran for Lieutenant Governor of New York as a Socialist. The year 1922 marked Hughan's first bid for US Congress, an office which she sought four times — in 1922 in the New York 16th District; in 1924 in the New York 17th District; in 1928 in the New York 15th District; and in 1934 in the New York 15th District. In 1926 she took a break from her Congressional campaigns to launch a bid for election to the US Senate from New York. Hughan also ran for New York State Assembly in 1927, 1932, and 1938.

Hughan does not seem to have exited the Socialist Party with its so-called "Old Guard" faction in 1936 to join the Social Democratic Federation, instead remaining loyal to fellow radical pacifist Norman Thomas despite the SPA's descent into factional war as the decade of the 1930s came to a close. Tellingly, neither did she run for elective office again after 1938.

=== Anti-war efforts ===
A deeply religious person, Hughan was a committed pacifist who spent the whole of her life fighting the spread of militarism in America. Hughan joined Frances M. Witherspoon and Tracy Mygatt in forming a number of peace groups linking pacifism, Christianity, and socialist politics. Unlike other opponents of war, Hughan intellectually developed a sophisticated socialist-pacifist position. Prior to U.S. military intervention in World War I, she challenged prowar socialists, such as Graham Stokes. Following the eruption of the war in the summer of 1914, Hughan felt herself called to action. In 1915 she organized the Anti-Enlistment League, with a headquarters in her apartment. Hughan and her associates were able to gather the signatures of some 3,500 men to a declaration opposing military enlistment with a view to demonstrating to American political leaders the unpopularity of the European war. She was a devoted opponent of the coordinated "Preparedness" campaign which emerged across the nation in 1915 and 1916.

American entry into the war in April 1917 spelled the end of the Anti-Enlistment League, with the government seizing the organization's files and records.

While she was never fired from her public school teaching positions for her political views, Hughan was called into suspicion in the eyes of some New York politicians. In 1919, Hughan was called before the Lusk Committee of the New York State Assembly, a special committee convened to investigate and report upon radicalism in New York state. The Committee denied her the Certificate of Character and Loyalty due to her appending the words "This obedience being qualified always by dictates of conscience" to the state's teachers' oath.

Later in 1919, Hughan's name appeared with those of settlement house pioneer Jane Addams and liberal journalist Oswald Garrison Villard on a list of 62 "dangerous radicals" presented to the Overman Committee of the U.S. Senate, the first congressional body charged with the investigation of radicalism in the United States.

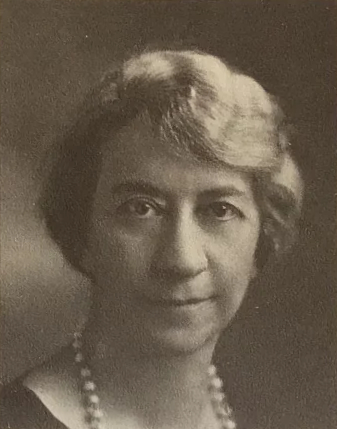
Hughan c. 1926

After World War I, Hughan led a campaign to organize an active war resistance movement in the United States. During the 1920s, she signed up numerous war resisters, delivered many speeches, and wrote pamphlets and tracts on the use of active nonviolence. She also organized various public protests against war and militarism, including some New York "NO More War" parades.

Hughan sat on the National Council and was a member of the New York Executive Committee of the Fellowship of Reconciliation, a religious pacifist organization, from 1920 to 1923. In 1923, she founded a new anti-militarist group, the War Resisters League (WRL), and presided over it as Secretary from the time of its formation. The intent behind the WRL was to provide an organizational framework for opponents of militarism who had no traditional religious basis for their pacifist beliefs. The organization of the WRL was supported by other pacifist groups, including the Fellowship of Reconciliation, the Women's Peace Society, and the Women's Peace Union.

In 1938, with another war looming in Europe, Hughan organized a new umbrella organization known as the United Pacifist Committee, designed to coordinate the educational and political activities of sundry pacifist groups. She helped with the organization of public demonstrations, including a series of "No More War" parades in New York City, and was a vigorous opponent of the return to military conscription in 1940. She continued to serve as Secretary of the War Resisters League continuously through the end of World War II in 1945, at which time she stepped down to become the group's "Honorary Secretary." She continued to remain active on the governing Executive Committee of the WRL.

== Death and legacy ==
Jessie Wallace Hughan retired in 1945. She stayed active in the War Resisters League as a member of the organization's Executive Committee until her death on April 10, 1955. She was 79 years old at the time of her death. She was survived by her sister Evelyn Hughan, with whom she had lived during her entire adult life, as well as her sister Marjorie Hughan Rockwell and Marjorie's four children, with whom Jessie was extremely close.

The organization that Hughan founded, the War Resisters League, as well as the organization she helped to found, Alpha Omicron Pi fraternity, both continue as vital and established institutions into the 21st century. Both of these organizations remember Hughan's name and her role in their formation. Alpha Omicron Pi annually awards a prize known as the Jessie Wallace Hughan Cup to the organization's outstanding chapter.

== Works ==
- The Present Status of Socialism in America. Introduction by John Spargo. New York: Columbia University Press, 1911. Reissued as American Socialism of the Present Day. New York: John Lane Co., 1911.
- The Facts of Socialism. New York: John Lane Co., 1913.
- "Woman and War," New York Call, Woman Suffrage Special, June 19, 1915, pg. 3.
- The Socialism of To-Day: A Source-book of the Present Position and Recent Development of the Socialist and Labor Parties in all Countries, Consisting Mainly of Original Documents. With Harry Laidler, J.G. Phelps Stokes, and William English Walling. New York: Henry Holt, 1920.
- What is War Resistance? New York: War Resisters League, n.d. [1920s].
- A Study of International Government. New York: Thomas Y. Crowell, 1923. Reissued in London by Harrap, 1924.
- What Is Socialism? New York: Vanguard Press, 1928.
- The Challenge of Mars, and Other Verses. New York: [Jessie Wallace Hughan], 1932.
- The Beginnings of War Resistance. New York: War Resisters League, 1937.
- What about Spain? New York: War Resisters League, 1937.
- If We Should Be Invaded: Facing a Fantastic Hypothesis. New York: War Resisters League, 1939.
- Pacifism and Invasion. New York: War Resisters League, 1942.
- Three Decades of War Resistance. New York: War Resisters League, 1942.
- A Preface to Post-War. New York: War Resisters League, 1943.
- Why Not Peace in 1944? New York: War Resisters League, 1944.
- New Leagues for Old: Blueprints or Foundations? New York: Plowshare Press, n.d. [c. 1945].
