= Lady Borton =

Writer

Lady Borton is a Quaker author and journalist. During the Vietnam War she volunteered for the American Friends Service Committee and then lived in Vietnam for many years. She was one of the few westerners who was allowed to live there after the end of the Vietnam war due to her works being sympathetic to the communist regime. Her works include After Sorrow, an account of her time in Vietnam and the people there.

== Bibliography ==
- The Defiant Muse: Vietnamese Feminist Poems from Antiquity to the Present
- After Sorrow: An American Among the Vietnamese
- Sensing the Enemy: An American Woman Among the Boat People of Vietnam
- Vietnam on the Move (The Gioi Publishers 2006)
- Karen Cadbury, "Our Enemy Is Not People: An Interview with Lady Borton", Friends Journal, Nov. 15, 1984
