= Richard Gregg (social philosopher) =

American philosopher (1885–1974)

Richard Bartlett Gregg (1885 – January 27, 1974) was an American social philosopher said to be "the first American to develop a substantial theory of nonviolent resistance" based on the teachings of Mahatma Gandhi, and so influenced the thinking of Martin Luther King Jr., Aldous Huxley, civil-rights theorist Bayard Rustin, the pacifist and socialist reformer Jessie Wallace Hughan, and the Peace Pledge Union. He was also a pioneer in developing the concept of companion planting, writing "Companion and Protective Plants" for the summer 1943 issue of Bio-Dynamics.

== Life and work ==
=== Law & labor relations ===
After graduating from Harvard Law in 1911, Gregg worked at several law firms in Boston. He joined Robert G. Valentine and Ordway Tead of Boston in the pioneering consulting firm of Valentine, Tead and Gregg who billed themselves as industrial counselors until Valentine's untimely death in November 1916. In 1916 he was employed in labor management by a private firm in Chicago. From 1917 to 1921 in Washington, D.C., at the NWLB, Gregg became the 'examiner in charge' for the Bethlehem Steel strike, publishing a 1919 law article. He then obtained a position at the Railway Department Employees Union. It involved traveling in support of its 400,000 workers during a time of strikes and labor disputes. These seven years in industrial relations he described as "investigation, conciliation, arbitration, publicity and statistical work for trade unions." The Union eventually was forced to capitulate. In an October 4, 1924 letter to his family Gregg explained his reasons for leaving the USA to take up residence in India. He indicated that over the previous decade he had worked in industry, government, and labor unions opposing strikes, running and settling strikes. This unique experience led him to conclude that government and industrialism were based on violence and that labor unions were ineffective as they worked within this framework and could not change it. He thought that there might be another approach to creating a humane social system in work of Gandhi in India.

=== Gandhi's Satyagraha ===
Disillusioned, he worked as a farmhand and took courses in agriculture at the University of Wisconsin in Madison. He wrote to Mohandas K. Gandhi who was then in jail. C. F. Andrews replied, inviting him to stay at the Sabarmati Ashram.

He sailed to India on January 1, 1925 for the study of Indian culture and to seek out Gandhi. First he lived at the ashram with Gandhi's family and his many followers (itinerant and permanent, many who were already well-known, or became so). He engaged in farming and spinning in local villages. Gandhi's spinning wheel later became an icon of the Swadeshi movement. Absorbing and integrating the nonviolent philosophy, Gregg became able to spread its teachings. He then taught on various subjects connected with Gandhi's activism, e.g., for three years the school run by Samuel Evans Stokes of Simla. Gregg corresponded with African-American leader W. E. B. Du Bois. After about four years in India, he returned to Boston. The next year he married. Drawing on his learning and experience with Gandhi's Satyagraha, he published pamphlets, essays, books. One of his titles later helped transmit Gandhi's inspiration to Martin Luther King Jr.

=== Ecology and farming ===
In the 1940s Gregg became involved in ecology and organic farming. He then worked eight years at the innovative farms in New England owned by Helen Nearing and Scott Nearing. In 1954 his first wife died, following a long illness. He remarried. In India from 1956 to 1958, he taught ecology and economics at Gandhigram Rural University in Tamil Nadu (near Madurai), a school associated with G. Ramachandran whom Gregg had met in 1925 at Gandhi's Sabarmati Ashram.

=== Martin Luther King Jr. ===
Also in 1956 Gregg began correspondence with Dr. King, during the Montgomery bus boycott. About the book The Power of Non-Violence King wrote to Gregg, "I don't know when I have read anything... that has given the idea of non-violence a more realistic and depthful interpretation." Gregg was "thrilled by the revival of Gandhi's method in Montgomery." For King's 1958 book Stride Toward Freedom Gregg provided some Gandhi background. He also aided King with scheduling and contacts when he and his wife visited in India in 1959. Gregg also took part in "nonviolent training sessions" for Black civil rights workers. King after the bus boycott listed his top five books: Gandhi's autobiography, Fischer's biography of Gandhi, Thoreau on "civil disobedience", Rauschenbusch on the social gospel, and Gregg.

== Publications ==
His most widely-known book, The Power of Non-Violence (Philadelphia: J. B. Lippincott 1934), was a presentation of Gandhi's teachings addressed to the western reader. He revised it for a 2d ed. in 1944, and again for a 3d ed. in 1959 with a 'Foreword' by Martin Luther King Jr.

His other writings referencing Gandhi include The Economics of Khaddar (1928), The Psychology and Strategy of Gandhi's Non-violent Resistance (1930), Gandhiji's Satyagraha (1930). In a 1939 pamphlet, Pacifist Program in Time of War, Threatened War or Fascism, he discussed a program for how American pacifists could use non-violence to oppose war and fascism in the United States.

An influential 1936 essay, "Simplified Living", his philosophical espousal of its need and benefit, was originally published in an Indian journal. He coined the term "voluntary simplicity". A Preparation for Science (1928) was aimed to prepare primary school teachers in rural India, to instruct village children helped by use of locally available materials.

Gregg authored A Compass for Civilization (Ahmedabad: Navajivan 1956), which was published under several titles.
