= War Resisters League =

American secular pacifist organization

- Abbreviation: WRL
- Formation: October 19, 1923; 103 years ago
- Founder: Jessie Wallace Hughan; Tracy Dickinson Mygatt; Frances M. Witherspoon; John Haynes Holmes
- Type: Non-profit secular pacifist organization
- Purpose: Pacifism, antimilitarism, social justice
- Headquarters: New York City, US
- Affiliations: War Resisters' International

The War Resisters League (WRL) is the oldest secular pacifist organization in the United States, having been founded in 1923.

== History ==
Founded in 1923 by men and women who had opposed World War I, it is a section of the London-based War Resisters' International. It continues to be one of the leading radical voices in the anti-war movement.

Many of the organization's founders had been jailed during World War I for refusing military service. From the Fellowship of Reconciliation many Jews, suffragists, socialists, and anarchists separated to form this more secular organization.

Although the WRL was opposed to US participation in World War II, it did not protest against it; the WRL complied with the Espionage Act, ceased public protests, and did not solicit new members during this period. During World War II, many members were imprisoned as conscientious objectors. In the 1950s, WRL members worked in the civil rights movement and organized protests against nuclear weapons testing and civil defense drills.

In the 1960s, WRL was the first pacifist organization to call for an end to the Vietnam War. WRL also organized the first demonstration against the war with a September 21, 1963 vigil at the U.S. Mission to the UN, followed by an October 9, 1963 picket of Madame Ngo Dinh Nhu speaking at the Waldorf-Astoria in New York City. WRL was among the primary groups (along with Committee for Nonviolent Action, the Fellowship of Reconciliation, the Socialist Party, and the Student Peace Union) to organize coordinated nationwide protests against the Vietnam War on December 19, 1964.

The organization's opposition to nuclear weapons was extended to include nuclear power in the 1970s and 1980s. The WRL has also been active in feminist and anti-racist causes and works with other organizations to reduce the level of violence in modern culture.

WRL published many important periodicals including The Conscientious Objector (1939–1946); WRL News (1945–1984); the WRL Peace Calendar from 1955–2012; Liberation magazine (1956–1977); WIN Peace & Freedom Through Nonviolent Action (1966–1984); The Nonviolent Activist (1984–2006); and the quarterly magazine WIN through revolutionary nonviolence (2006–2015), and other materials. See the external links below to find the archived publications.

== The Centennial ==
WRL celebrated the centennial of its founding in 2023 by producing a traveling exhibit consisting of eight 7-foot tall freestanding panels on various topics and a 12-foot wide timeline banner. The entire contents of the traveling exhibit is contained within an 84-page full-color book published by the League.

In addition the Judd Foundation hosted celebrations of WRL's centennial with a reception on October 18, 2023, followed by "The Art of War Resistance" panel discussion on October 25, 2023, at its SoHo gallery in New York City.

Among other centennial projects, a weekly blog highlighting specific events and publications in WRL's history began posting in January 2023 and continues through 2024.

== Current activities ==
The War Resisters League actively organized against the wars in Iraq and Afghanistan and continues to protest what it perceives as U.S. militarism and commitment to endless war, as well as the impact of war at home. Much of its organizing is focused on challenging military recruiters and ending corporate profit from war.

WRL is involved in a number of national peace and justice coalitions, including National Network Opposing the Militarization of Youth and the National War Tax Resistance Coordinating Committee. Starting in 1958, WRL awarded almost annually the War Resisters League Peace Award to a person or organization whose work represents the League's radical nonviolent program of action. The Covid-19 pandemic curtailed the peace award ceremonies.

The War Resisters League annually publishes a pie chart showing how much of the U.S. federal budget actually covers current and past military expenses, listing the total as 37% based on the FY2023 proposed federal budget:

"The figures are federal funds, which do not include trust funds [emphasis added] — such as Social Security — that are raised and spent separately from income taxes....The government practice of combining trust and federal funds began during the Vietnam War, thus making the human needs portion of the budget seem larger and the military portion smaller. "

Using the larger total spending that includes trust funds, official government figures produce smaller percentages for military spending:

"[Dov S. Zakheim, the Pentagon comptroller pointed] out that the 2004 military budget would represent 16.6 percent of all federal spending [including trust funds; emphasis added], compared with 27.3 percent in the late 1980s."

== Key members ==
- Sidney Aberman
- Devere Allen
- Norma Becker
- Frida Berrigan
- Albert Bigelow
- Karl Bissinger
- Elinor Byrns
- Maris Cakars
- Mandy Carter
- Sybil Claiborne
- Winston Dancis
- Dave Dellinger
- Barbara Deming
- Ralph DiGia
- Julius Eichel
- Joe Felmet
- Henry Leroy Finch Jr.
- Larry Gara
- Sidney E. Goldstein
- Walter Gormly
- Edward P. Gottlieb
- Richard Gregg
- G. Simon Harak
- George W. Hartmann
- Ammon Hennacy
- Nat Hentoff
- Scott Herrick
- Isidor B. Hoffman
- John Haynes Holmes
- George Houser
- Evelyn West Hughan
- Jessie Wallace Hughan
- Toyohiko Kagawa
- Bert Kanegson
- Abe Kaufman
- Randy Kehler
- Roy Kepler
- Steve Ladd
- Frieda Langer Lazarus
- Bradford Lyttle
- Ruth MacAdam
- Dwight Macdonald
- David McReynolds
- Mary S. McDowell
- A.J. Muste
- Tracy Dickinson Mygatt
- Frank Olmstead (pacifist)
- James Otsuka
- Grace Paley
- James Peck
- Orlie Pell
- Frances Rose Ransom
- Earle L. Reynolds
- Ruth Mary Reynolds
- Edward (Ned) Richards
- Igal Roodenko
- Vicki Rovere
- Bayard Rustin
- Ira Sandperl
- Lawrence Scott (Quaker)
- Joanne Sheehan
- Craig Simpson
- Upton Sinclair
- Ernest Allyn Smith
- William Sutherland
- Arlo Tatum
- Evan W. Thomas (pacifist)
- Carmen Trotta
- Jay Nelson Tuck
- Anna Strunsky Walling
- George Willoughby
- Lillian Willoughby
- Frances M. Witherspoon
- Irma Zigas

== See also ==
- List of anti-war organizations
- List of peace activists
- Military budget and total US federal spending
- Pacifism
- People's Freedom Union
- War resister
- War Resisters' International
