= Karl Bissinger =

American photographer (1914–2008)

- Born: November 5, 1914; Cincinnati, Ohio, United States
- Died: November 19, 2008 (aged 94); Westbeth Artists Community, Manhattan, United States
- Education: Cincinnati Art Museum; Art Students League of New York
- Occupation: Photographer

Karl Bissinger (November 5, 1914 – November 19, 2008) was an American photographer best known for his portraits of notable figures in the world of art following World War II, with regular travel and fashion features in popular magazines of the mid-twentieth century. Bissinger’s career as a photographer took second place to his later work as an activist for the War Resisters League and other pacifist organizations.

== Biography ==
=== Early years ===
Karl Bissinger was born in Cincinnati, Ohio, United States, in 1914. He studied art at the Cincinnati Art Museum as a high-school student and moved to Manhattan, where he studied painting at the Art Students League of New York in the late 1930s.

=== Career ===
Bissinger's first connection to photography was when he was a stylist for the studios of Condé Nast Publications, where he developed relationships with some of the portrait and fashion photographers on staff, including Cecil Beaton, George Hoyningen-Huene, Irving Penn and John Rawlings. He was part of group that shared a residence on Fire Island with Richard Avedon, who lent him a camera and encouraged him to take pictures. His first photographic subjects were Avedon's wife and author James Baldwin. Avendon was impressed with Bissinger's work and sent him to Lillian Bassman, art director for Junior Bazaar.

His first assignment as a photographer was for Junior Bazaar, and he started taking portraits and doing fashion shoots for Harper's Bazaar, Theater Arts, Town & Country and Vogue. He was staff photographer for the 12-issue lifespan of the magazine Flair, edited by Fleur Cowles, the Duke and Duchess of Windsor, Gary Cooper, John Ford, Katharine Hepburn and John Wayne.

Bissinger developed an interest in the arts scene, photographing Truman Capote on the set of a film in Paris and Marlon Brando in front of a window in his New York City apartment. A 1949 photograph taken at a table in the garden of Manhattan's Café Nicholson of the up-and-coming in the arts world included artist Buffie Johnson, ballerina Tanaquil LeClercq, author Gore Vidal, playwright Tennessee Williams and novelist Donald Windham, in what The New York Times described as "a class picture of the young and the talented in the American arts, more than ready for their close-ups". Café Nicholson, which he created with Johnny Nicholson, who had worked with him as a window-dresser at Lord & Taylor earlier in his career, was the frequent setting of his photographs. During this time, Bissinger met fashion illustrator and designer Richard Hanley, who became his life partner.

=== Later years ===
Bissinger left photography as a profession in the 1950s and developed a focus on political issues, becoming involved in a number of peace organizations. He met Julian Beck and Judith Malina, founders of The Living Theatre, at a demonstration in the early 1960s and would take photos of the company's performances. He became a draft counselor during the Vietnam War, working full-time at the Greenwich Village Peace Center, providing guidance on avoiding being drafted for military service. He became an active member of the War Resisters League, advocating for nuclear disarmament.

In the early 2000s, there was a renewed interest in Bissinger's early photographic work from the 1940s and 1950s; his photographs of Morocco were featured in Elias Canetti's The Voices of Marrakesh (2001), and The Luminous Years, a collection of Bissinger's portraits, was published in 2003.

=== Death and legacy ===
Bissinger died at the age of 94 on November 19, 2008, in his Manhattan home at Westbeth Artists Community. A cause of death was not disclosed.

=== Bibliography ===
- The Luminous Years: Portraits at Mid-Century (Harry N. Abrams, 2003, ISBN 0810946025)
