= David Dellinger =

American pacifist and activist

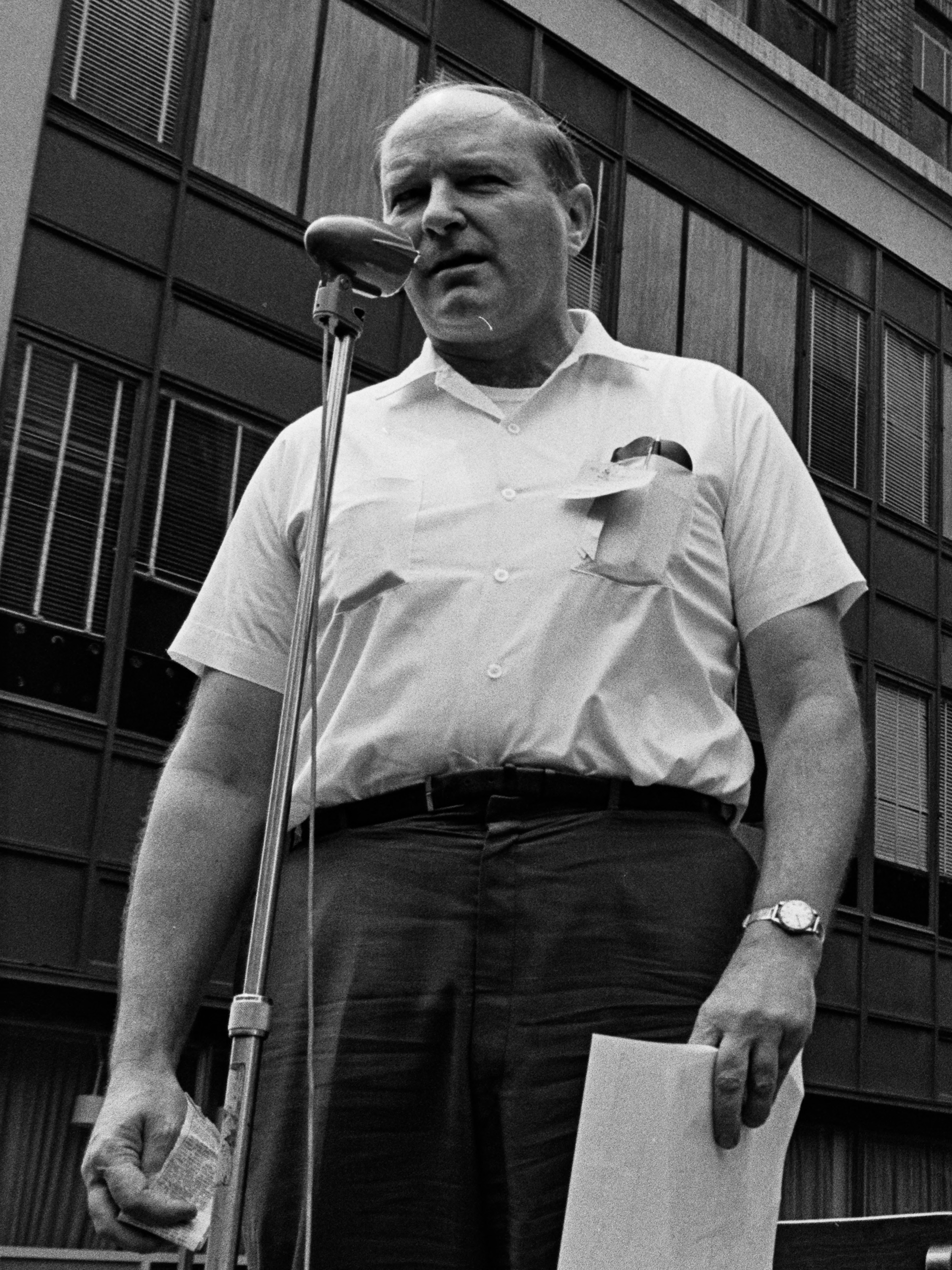
- Dellinger in 1967
- Born: August 22, 1915; Wakefield, Massachusetts, U.S.
- Died: May 25, 2004 (aged 88); Montpelier, Vermont, U.S.
- Education: Yale University (BA); New College, Oxford; Union Theological Seminary
- Occupations: Writer; activist; pacifist
- Known for: Political activism, one of the Chicago Seven
- Spouse: Elizabeth Peterson

David T. Dellinger (August 22, 1915 – May 25, 2004) was an American pacifist and an activist for nonviolent social change. Although active beginning in the early 1940s, Dellinger reached peak prominence as one of the Chicago Seven, who were put on trial in 1969.

== Early life ==
Dellinger was born in Wakefield, Massachusetts to a wealthy family on August 22, 1915. He was the son of Maria Fiske and Raymond Pennington Dellinger; his father was an alumnus of Yale University, a lawyer, and a prominent Republican and friend of Calvin Coolidge. His maternal grandmother, Alice Bird Fiske, was active in the Daughters of the American Revolution.

Dellinger graduated from Yale University with a Bachelor of Arts in economics, began a doctorate for a year at New College, Oxford, and studied theology at the Union Theological Seminary of Columbia University with the intention of becoming a Congregationalist minister. At Yale, he had been a classmate and friend of the economist and political theorist Walt Rostow. Rejecting his comfortable background, he walked out of Yale one day to live with hobos during the Depression. While at Oxford, he visited Nazi Germany and drove an ambulance during the Spanish Civil War. Dellinger, who opposed the war's victorious Nationalist faction led by Francisco Franco, later recalled, "After Spain, World War II was simple. I wasn't even tempted to pick up a gun to fight for General Motors, U.S. Steel, or the Chase Manhattan Bank, even if Hitler was running the other side."

== Political career ==
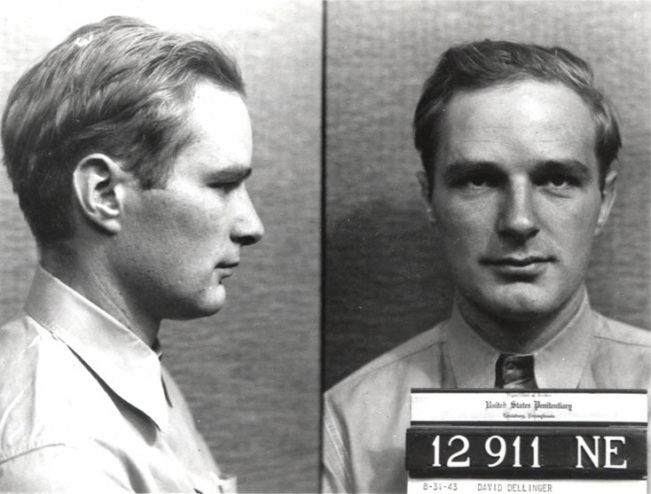
Dellinger's prison mugshot, 1943

During World War II, Dellinger was an imprisoned conscientious objector and anti-war agitator. In federal prison, he and fellow conscientious objectors, including Ralph DiGia and Bill Sutherland, protested racial segregation in the dining halls, which were ultimately integrated because of the protests. He was a member of the executive committee of the Socialist Party of America and the Young People's Socialist League, its youth section, until he left in 1943. In February 1946, Dellinger helped found the radical pacifist Committee for Nonviolent Revolution. In 1948, he co-founded the Central Committee for Conscientious Objectors. In July–November 1951, Dellinger participated in the Paris-to-Moscow bicycle trip for disarmament with Ralph DiGia, Bill Sutherland, and Art Emery, which was sponsored by the Peacemakers; cyclists got as far as the headquarters of the Soviet Army in Vienna. “We were warned not to go to the Soviet zone. People who went to the army headquarters were sometimes never seen again. But we didn’t think that would happen to us. The worst that would happen was jail, and I already knew I could stand that. I was only worried about what I was putting my family through back in the States.” The Paris-to-Moscow Bicycle Trip for Disarmament was a key inspiration for the San Francisco to Moscow Walk for Peace in 1960–1961. Dellinger was also a long-time member of the War Resisters League, joining the staff in March 1955.

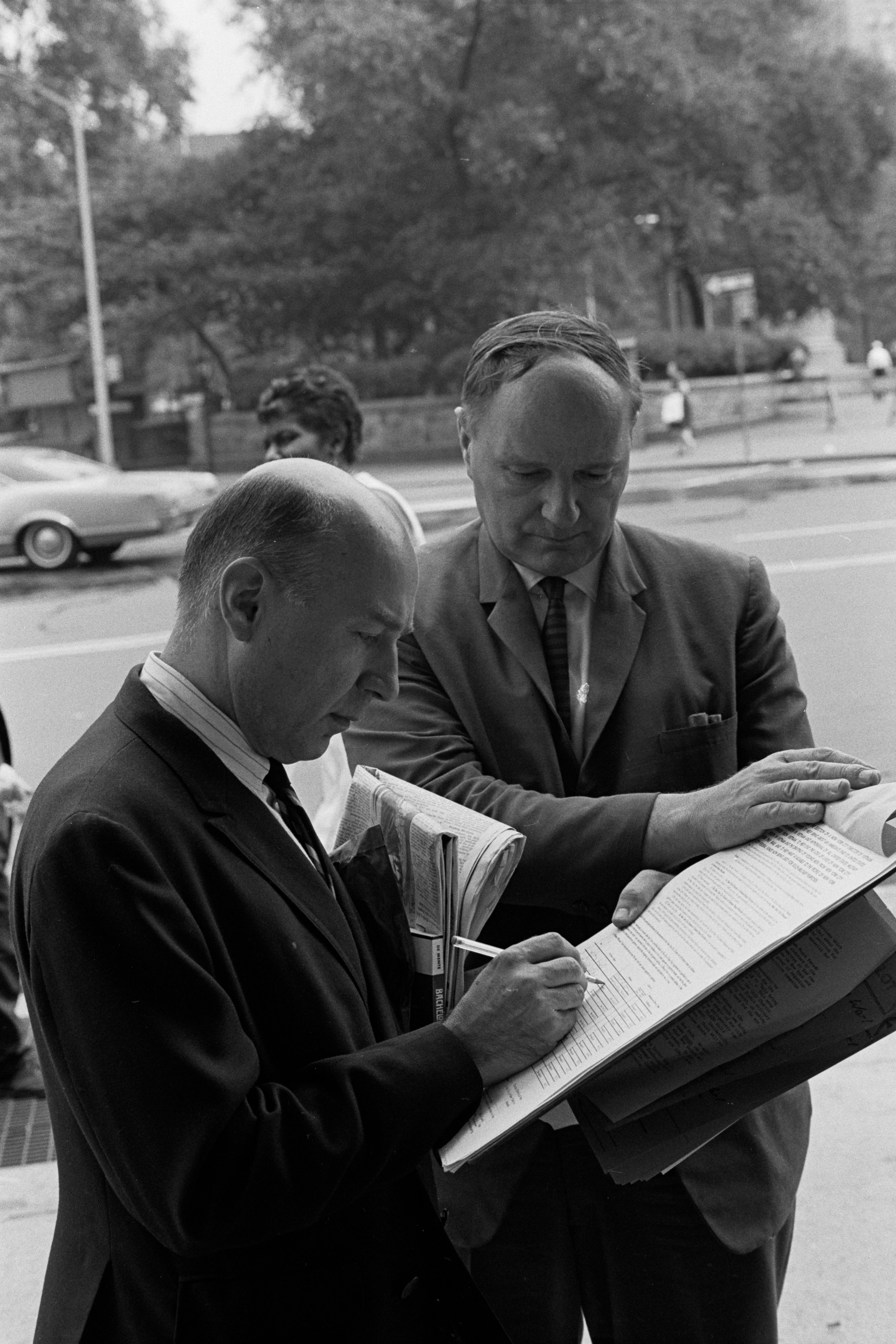
Dellinger (right) collects signatures for a "Peace Referendum," July 8, 1967

Throughout the 1950s and 1960s, Dellinger joined freedom marches in the South and led many hunger strikes in jail. In 1956, he, Dorothy Day, and A. J. Muste founded the magazine Liberation as a forum for the pacifist, non-Marxist left. In 1961, Dellinger joined the newly founded Fair Play for Cuba Committee; by late 1961, he had joined the executive of the organization. Dellinger had contacts and friendships with diverse individuals such as Eleanor Roosevelt, Ho Chi Minh, Martin Luther King Jr., Abbie Hoffman, A.J. Muste, Greg Calvert, James Bevel, David McReynolds, and numerous Black Panthers, namely Fred Hampton whom he greatly admired.

As chair of the Fifth Avenue Vietnam Peace Parade Committee, Dellinger worked with many anti-war organizations and helped bring King and Bevel into leadership positions in the 1960s anti-war movement. In 1966, he traveled to both North and South Vietnam to learn first-hand of the impact of American bombings. He later recalled that critics ignored his trip to Saigon and focused solely on his visit to Hanoi. In 1968, he signed the "Writers and Editors War Tax Protest" pledge, vowing to refuse tax payments to protest the Vietnam War, and later became a sponsor of the War Tax Resistance project.

=== Chicago Seven trial ===
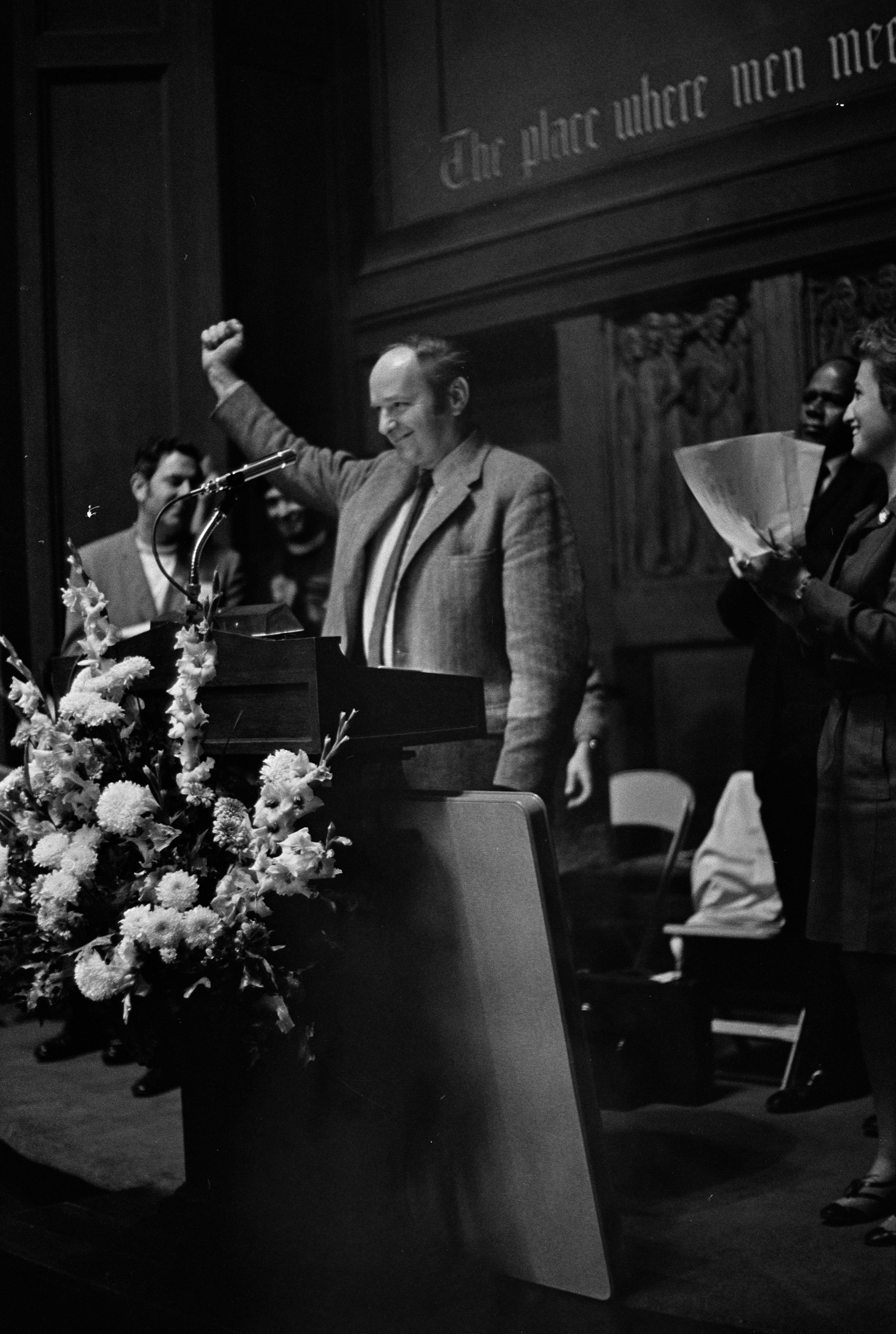
Dellinger raises a clenched fist at a planning meeting for the Moratorium to End the War in Vietnam, October 8, 1969

As US involvement in Vietnam grew, Dellinger applied Mahatma Gandhi's principles of nonviolence to his activism within the growing anti-war movement. One of the high points of this was the Chicago Seven trial over allegations that Dellinger and several others had conspired to cross state lines with the intention of inciting a riot, after anti-war protesters had interrupted the 1968 Democratic National Convention in Chicago. The ensuing court case was turned by Dellinger and his co-defendants into a nationally publicized platform for putting the Vietnam War on trial. On February 18, 1970, they were acquitted of the conspiracy charge, but five defendants, including Dellinger, were convicted of crossing state lines to incite a riot. All of the defendants, along with their two lawyers, were given sentences for contempt of court; Dellinger was sentenced to 29 months and 16 days on 32 contempt counts.

Judge Julius Hoffman's handling of the trial, along with the FBI's bugging of the defense lawyers, resulted, with the help of the Center for Constitutional Rights, in the convictions being overturned by the Seventh Circuit Court of Appeals two years later. The appeals court remanded the contempt citations for trial before a judge other than Hoffman. Dellinger was eventually convicted on five contempt counts, but was sentenced to time already served.

=== Subsequent activities ===
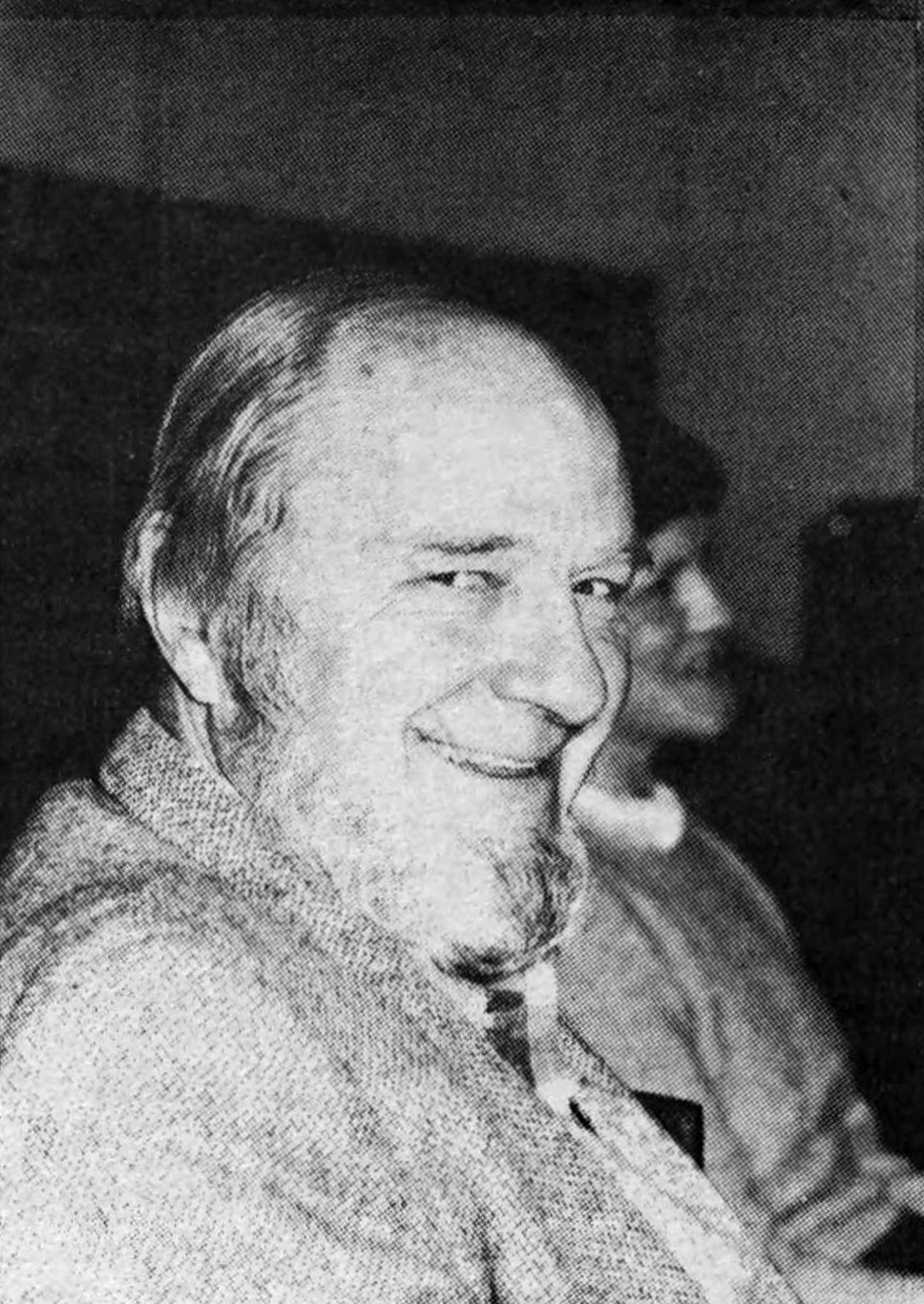
Dellinger at an anti-nuclear symposium at the University of Vermont, November 11, 1982

In December 1971, Dellinger spoke at the John Sinclair Freedom Rally in Ann Arbor, Michigan.

In the late 1970s, Dellinger spent two years teaching at Goddard College's Adult Degree Program and Vermont College. In 2001, he was invited back to give the commencement address to the graduating class of Goddard's Residential Undergraduate Program.

Dellinger was also a founder of Seven Days, an American alternative news magazine written from a leftist or anti-establishment perspective. He obtained the subscription list of Ramparts magazine, which ceased publication in October 1975. That year, Seven Days began preview editions, and published regularly beginning in 1977, until they ceased publication in 1980.

In 1986, when his Yale class of 1936 held its 50th reunion, Dellinger wrote in the reunion book: "Lest my way of life sounds puritanical or austere, I always emphasize that in the long run one can't satisfactorily say no to war, violence, and injustice unless one is simultaneously saying yes to life, love, and laughter."

For his lifelong commitment to pacifist values and for serving as a spokesperson for the peace movement, Dellinger was awarded the Peace Abbey International Courage of Conscience award on September 26, 1992.

In 1996, during the first Democratic National Convention held in Chicago since 1968, Dellinger and his grandson were arrested along with nine others, including Civil Rights Movement historian Randy Kryn, Bradford Lyttle, and Abbie Hoffman's son Andrew, during a sit-in at Chicago's Kluczynski Federal Building

In 2001, Dellinger led a group of young activists from Montpelier, Vermont to Quebec City to protest a conference that planned to create a free-trade zone.

== Death ==
Dellinger died in Montpelier, Vermont, on May 25, 2004 after an extensive stay at Heaton Woods Nursing Home. He suffered from Alzheimer's disease for years before his death.

== Popular culture ==
- Peter Boyle played Dellinger in the 1987 film Conspiracy: The Trial of the Chicago 8.
- Dylan Baker voiced Dellinger in the 2007 animated documentary Chicago 10.
- In the 2010 film The Chicago 8, Dellinger was played by Peter Mackenzie.
- John Carroll Lynch portrayed Dellinger in the 2020 drama film The Trial of the Chicago 7.

== Selected works ==
- Dellinger, David T., Revolutionary Nonviolence: Essays by Dave Dellinger, Indianapolis : Bobbs-Merrill, 1970
- Dellinger, David T., More Power Than We Know: The People’s Movement Toward Democracy, Garden City, N.Y. : Anchor Press, 1975. ISBN 0-385-00162-2
- Dellinger, David T., Vietnam Revisited: From Covert Action to Invasion to Reconstruction, Boston, MA : South End Press, 1986. ISBN 0-89608-320-9
- Dellinger, David T., From Yale to Jail: The Life Story of a Moral Dissenter, New York : Pantheon Books, 1993. ISBN 0-679-40591-7. (Dellinger's autobiography)
- Dellinger, David (1999). "Why I Refused to Register in the October 1940 Draft and a Little of What It Led To". In Gara, Larry; Gara, Lenna Mae (eds.). A Few Small Candles: War Resisters of World War II Tell Their Stories. Kent State University Press. pp. 20–37. ISBN 0-87338-621-3.

== See also ==
- List of peace activists
