= Frances M. Witherspoon =

American writer and activist (1886–1973)

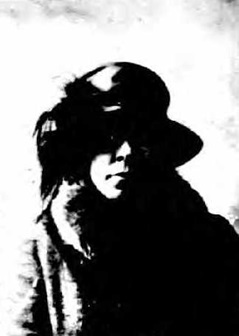
Witherspoon's passport photo, 1923

Frances May Witherspoon (July 8, 1886 – December 16, 1973) was an American writer and activist, co-founder with Tracy Dickinson Mygatt of the War Resisters League, and executive secretary of the New York Bureau of Legal Advice, a forerunner of the American Civil Liberties Union.

== Early life and education ==
Frances May Witherspoon was born in 1886, in Meridian, Mississippi, the daughter of law professor and Congressman Samuel Andrew Witherspoon, and his wife, Susan E. May. She graduated from Bryn Mawr College in 1909. After some years as a suffrage and labor organizer in Pennsylvania, she and Mygatt moved to New York City in 1913.

== Career and activism ==
In New York City Witherspoon and Mygatt joined the Woman's Peace Party, and together edited their publication, Four Lights. They also organized the Socialist Suffrage Brigade, and edited an issue of The Call about suffrage.

During the first World War, Witherspoon worked with various peace organizations, and lobbied in Washington against U. S. involvement in the war. She was a founding officer of the Anti-Enlistment League in 1915. In 1917, she co-founded the New York Bureau of Legal Advice with attorney Charles Recht, to assist conscientious objectors, draft resisters, and war protesters. She was anonymous author of a pamphlet, Who Are the Conscientious Objectors? published in 1919.

Witherspoon and Mygatt continued with peace work after the war, as members of the Women's Peace Union, and as founders of the War Resisters League in 1923. They were charter members of the Episcopal Pacifist Fellowship when it was founded in 1939. In 1961 they were recognized jointly with the WRL Peace Award.

Witherspoon and Mygatt co-wrote two Biblical novels, The Glorious Company (1928) and Armor of Light (1930), and a play about Vincent van Gogh, Stranger Upon Earth, among other literary collaborations.

In her eighties, Frances Witherspoon organized a campaign among Bryn Mawr alumnae against the Vietnam War.

== Personal life and legacy ==
Witherspoon lived and worked with Tracy D. Mygatt for over sixty years, in New York City, and later in Brewster, New York and Philadelphia, Pennsylvania. The pair were active in the Episcopal Church. They died within a month of each other, in late 1973, in Philadelphia; Witherspoon was 87 years old. The couple's papers were donated to the Swarthmore College Peace Collection.
