= APIC =

APIC may refer to:

== Organisations ==
- Africa Policy Information Center, a parent-body of Africa Action
- American Political Items Collectors, a US-based organization of collectors of items from political campaigns
- Asia-Pacific Institute of Creativity, a former college in Miaoli County, Taiwan
- Association for Professionals in Infection Control and Epidemiology, a US-based healthcare-advancement organization

== Other uses ==
- Additional paid in capital, in finance
- Advanced Programmable Interrupt Controller, in computing: a type of programmable interrupt controller
- Application Policy Infrastructure Controller, a component of Cisco's implementation of software-defined networking
- APIC vector (absolute pitch-class interval vector), in musical set theory
- Agreement on the Privileges and Immunities of the International Criminal Court, an international treaty
- Asia Petrochemical Industry Conference, an international conference in the petrochemical industry

== See also ==
- Apic acid, a component of apitoxin, or honey bee venom
