= Bernice Fisher =

American civil rights activist (1916–1966)

- Born: Elsie Bernice Fisher; December 8, 1916; Punxsutawney, Pennsylvania, U.S.
- Died: May 2, 1966 (aged 49); New York City, New York, U.S.
- Known for: Civil rights activist

Elsie Bernice Fisher (December 8, 1916 – May 2, 1966) was a civil rights activist and union organizer. She was among the co-founders of the Congress of Racial Equality (CORE) in 1942 in Chicago, Illinois.

== Civil rights leader and union organizer ==
As an activist Fisher headed a cell with the Fellowship of Reconciliation (FOR) in Chicago to concentrate on race relations. This small cell provided the people for the beginnings of the Committee on Racial Equality which they soon renamed the Congress of Racial Equality (CORE). James Farmer was among the co-founders. The founding members of CORE were James Farmer, Bernice Fisher, George Houser, Homer A. Jack, James Russell Robinson, and Joe Guinn.

Bayard Rustin, while not a founder of CORE, was a campus traveler for the Fellowship of Reconciliation; he worked with and advised the founders. Houser reported that James Farmer, in addition to his Chicago activities, traveled the country with FOR and spoke about his national vision for CORE. He said that Fisher was the nuts and bolts person for CORE in Chicago and later St. Louis. Houser mentioned pre-CORE and initial activities in Chicago of Jim Farmer, Jim Robinson, Bernice Fisher, Homer Jack and Joe Guinn that included the Fellowship house (an early effort at desegregating housing), Jack Spratt restaurant sit-in, and White City roller-rink among others. He spoke highly of Bernice Fisher and of her importance to the development of CORE.

Fisher has been called the "godmother of the restaurant 'sit-in' technique" by fellow activist and union organizer Ernest Calloway, who worked closely with Fisher in St. Louis and admired her.

Fisher worked tirelessly to establish the Committee On Racial Equality. Soon the founders, including Fisher, changed the name to Congress of Racial Equality CORE. This group introduced the sit-in as a tactic in challenging racial segregation in public accommodations. Fisher was instrumental in establishing the sit-in as a nonviolent technique in the Civil Rights Movement. In 1942 CORE's six founders followed the nonviolent organizing techniques outlined in Krishnalal Shridharani's War Without Violence. This was Shridharani's doctoral thesis at Columbia, and within the year had become a national bestseller. Shridharani, an intimate of Gandhi, who had been jailed in the Salt March, had codified Gandhi's techniques. Gandhi had not wanted his followers to codify his teachings, as he had wanted people to come to India, study intensively and experience the movement first-hand. However, the British Indian authorities were restricting Gandhi's non-Indian followers from coming into India, and travelling outside of the subcontinent was beyond the means of most of his followers. Fisher made a list of rules to follow at demonstrations, based on Gandhi's teachings, that was distributed as a handbill at some demonstrations.

Following Gandhi's first rule of involving the community and finding out its priorities, this first group of Fisher's concentrated on integrating housing, repealing laws against integrating neighborhoods in Chicago, and integrating restaurants and amusement venues in Chicago.

News of CORE's work spread and others followed their lead. In 1943, shortly after the first CORE sit-ins, a group of seventeen young women at Howard University in Washington DC began an unpublicized sit-in at a luncheonette in the Howard neighborhood. They had become acquainted with CORE through Fellowship of Reconciliation Campus Travelers Bayard Rustin and James Farmer. The group at Howard included Ruth Powell, Marianne Musgrave, Patricia Roberts, & Juanita Morrow Nelson, and they were represented by Pauli Murray, who was then in Howard Law School.

Fisher became an organizer of department store workers in Chicago. During World War II, wages were frozen by government order, but despite a freeze on prices, inflation was rampant. Working conditions for department store employees were onerous: women were not allowed to sit at work, they had no regular breaks, wages were low, and the stores were understaffed. Better pay for women was available in industry, for those who were free to take advantage of the opportunity.

Fisher was brought to St. Louis by Harold Gibbons of the Teamsters, one of the most progressive labor leaders in America at the time. Gibbons had hired Ernest Calloway, an African-American organizer, who would work in the segregated mid-South for the Teamsters. He hired Fisher on the recommendation of Calloway, who had been impressed by her work in Chicago.

During her years in St. Louis, Fisher organized that city's chapter of CORE, which produced many of the organization's national leaders. St. Louis CORE kept the national organization going in the late 1940s and the 1950s. They refined many of the techniques promoted by the Chicago group. Others associated with the St. Louis chapter were Marian O'Fallon Oldham, Charles Oldham, Irving & Margaret Dagen, Joe & Billie Ames, Marvin Rich, Norman Seay and Wanda Penny. St. Louis CORE became a leading exponent of the nonviolent direct action as applied to race relations.

During the last ten years of her life, Fisher was active with the Concord Baptist Church of Christ in Brooklyn, New York. She was Co-Chairman with Cyprian Belle Concord of the Social Action Committee created by the Concord Baptist Church.

Fisher lived most of her adult life in New York, St. Louis, and Chicago. She participated in many civil-rights nonviolent direct-action activities and labor union anti-discrimination efforts in those cities. She was long associated with the labor movement and served as an official with several unions, including the United Federation of Teachers, Retail Wholesale and Department Stores Union, CIO; the Government and Civic Organizing Committee in Chicago; the American Federation of State, County and Municipal Workers in New York, and others. She had also been active with the Housing Conference of Chicago. She was also serving on the executive board of Brooklyn NAACP and on the National Board of the Workers Defense League. She is buried at The Evergreens Cemetery, Brooklyn, N.Y.

== Education ==
Fisher graduated from the University of Chicago on June 18, 1943, with a major area of Divinity. She previously studied at Colgate Rochester Divinity School, Rochester, N.Y., which she attended from 1939 to 1941, and studied at the Rochester Collegiate Center, 1935 to 1936. She graduated from Monroe High School in Rochester in 1934.

== Family ==
Fisher's father was Jay Merritt Fisher, born August 21, 1877, Syracuse, New York, to Charles Gold Fisher, M.D., and Annie (Schutt) Fisher. He moved with his family to Pennsylvania about 1880. Her mother was Annie Rosetta (Morrison) Fisher, born April 17, 1881, Ambrose, Indiana County, Pennsylvania, daughter of George Morrison and Emma (Goodwin) Morrison. Her brother was Donald Morrison Fisher, born March 10, 1911, Punxsutawney, Pa., and died on March 21, 1983, in Syracuse, New York. Donald with E. Ruth (Loke) had five children, Thomas G. Fisher, Dennis G. Fisher, Frank W. Fisher, Craig W. Fisher and Christine E. Fisher.

== See also ==
- Civil Rights Movement
- Timeline of the civil rights movement
- Greensboro sit-ins

== Books ==
- Kimbrough, Mary, and Margaret W. Dagen, Victory without Violence, The First Ten Years of the St. Louis Committee of Racial Equality (CORE), 1947-1957 by Columbia, Missouri: University of Missouri Press, 2000. The dedication page to Victory Without Violence reads: "To Bernice Fisher, whose voice sounded the call to action. And to the memory of the members of the St. Louis Committee of Racial Equality who pursued a quiet but determined crusade for human rights."
- Farmer, James, Lay Bare The Heart: An Autobiography of The Civil Rights Movement, 1985, Plume Book, New American Library.
- Frazier, Nishani (2017). Harambee City: Congress of Racial Equality in Cleveland and the Rise of Black Power Populism. University of Arkansas Press. ISBN 1682260186.

== Miscellaneous sources ==
- PERSONAL HISTORY QUESTIONNAIRE, The City of New York, Department of Personnel, 4 pages, completed by Bernice Fisher; undated but contains these years and cities of residence: 1931 Jamestown, N.Y.; 1931–1941 Rochester, N.Y.; 1941–1945 Chicago, Ill; 1945–1946 Chicago and Detroit; 1946–1949 St. Louis, Mo.; 1953–1956 Chicago, Ill.; 1956–present Brooklyn, N.Y. (Note: Fisher was still living in Brooklyn, New York, when she died in May 1966.
- Ledger No. 5281 Union Card expires December 31, 1942, Sister Bernice Fisher, Warehousemen, Loaders, Stackers and Graders, Local 688...of the I.B. of T.C.W. and H. of A. affiliated with the A. F. of L. and Honorable Withdrawal Card of Bernice Fisher, Local No. 688, is dated 9 May 1949 are in the possession of Frank W. Fisher.
- Unacknowledged Leaders: Sarah Lawrence Conference, Sisters in Struggle, Sheila Shiki y Michaels, New York, NY, March 8, 2003; Sheila Shiki y Michaels, New York, NY, November 11, 2002.
- Oral Histories, The Reminiscences of George Houser, James R. Robinson and Marvin Rich in the Sheila Michaels Oral History Collection of Columbia University in New York City.
- United Federation of Teachers newspaper, UFT Expands Union Organizing Staff page 5; my copy has only pages 5 through 8 and doesn't give the date of publication, but it contains the page 5 story, and board meeting minutes of Nov. 4 and 16, 1964 on page 8.

There is much discussion by Farmer and Houser on the founding of CORE in several issues of Fellowship magazine of the Fellowship of Reconciliation in 1992 (Spring, Summer and Winter issues). Participants in a conference on October 22, 1992, "Erasing the Color Line in the North", attended by both Houser and Farmer, agreed that the founders of CORE were Jim Farmer, George Houser and Bernice Fisher.

James Farmer, in his book Lay Bare The Heart, discusses "CORE IS BORN" (Chapter 10). He mentions Bob "Chino" (the Hispanic nickname for a Chinese man, by which he was widely known), and Hugo Victoreen as well as George Houser, Bernice Fisher, Jimmy Robinson, Joe Guinn, Homer Jack and himself as participants when the organization CORE was formed. Bernice became secretary and Jimmy became treasurer.

The Wisconsin Historical Society is home to a large collection of the papers of the Congress of Racial Equality, Wisconsin Historical Society, 816 State St., Madison, Wisconsin 53706.

An extensive oral history collection related to the Congress of Racial Equality is kept at Howard University, Washington, DC 20059. Interviews can be found online here.

The University of Texas at Austin retains the papers of James and Lula Farmer. These contain material related to Bernice Fisher. The inventory of the archive is available online here.
