= James Farmer =

American civil rights activist (1920–1999)

James L Farmer Jr.
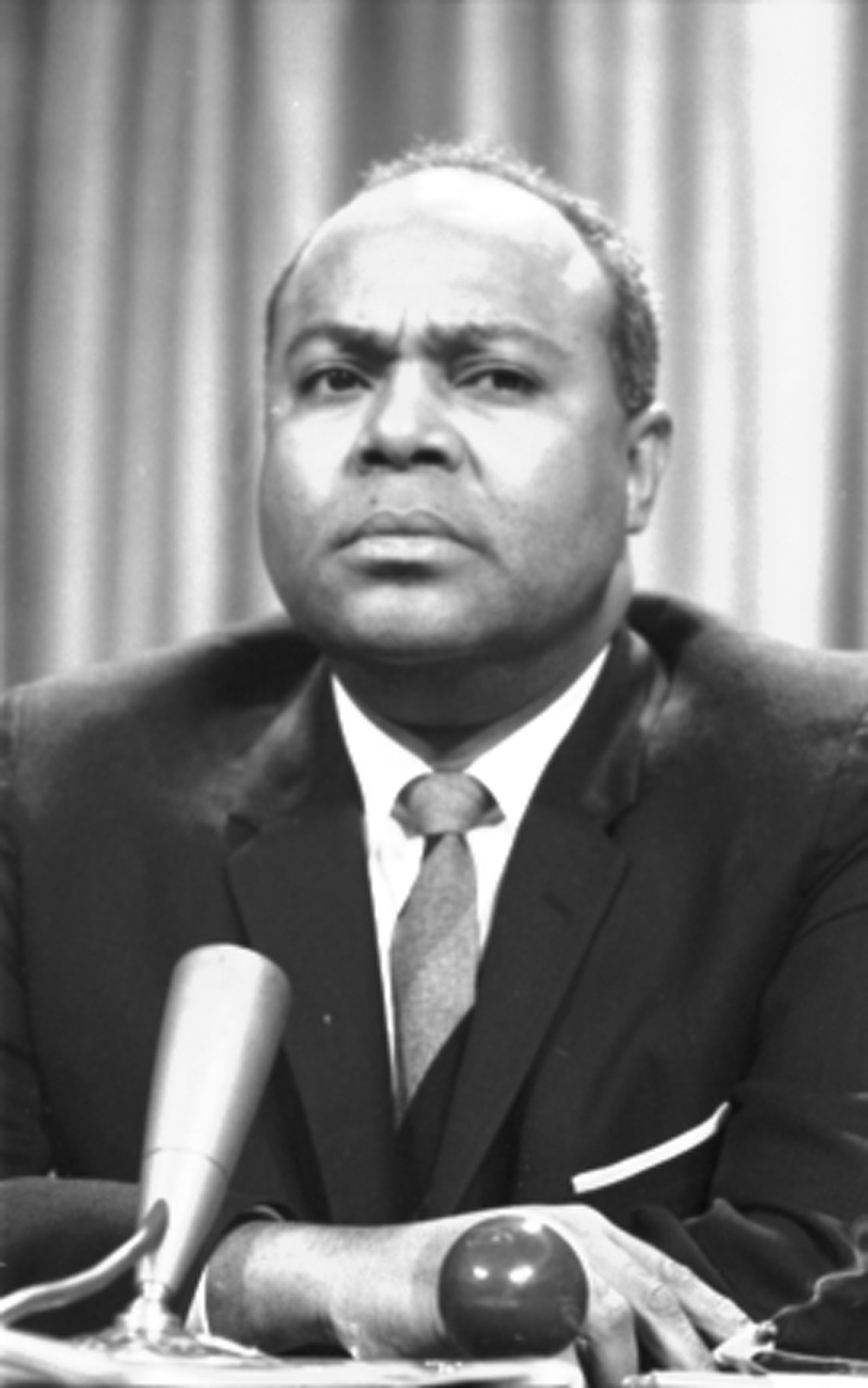

1st National Director of the Congress of Racial Equality
- In office 1942–1966
- Preceded by: Position established
- Succeeded by: Floyd McKissick

Personal details
- Born: James Leonard Farmer Jr. January 12, 1920 Marshall, Texas, US
- Died: July 9, 1999 (aged 79) Fredericksburg, Virginia, US
- Spouse(s): Winnie Christie (m. 1945–1946) Lula Peterson (m. 1949–1977)
- Children: 2
- Relatives: James L. Farmer Sr. (father)
- Education: Wiley University (BS); Howard University (BDiv)

James Leonard Farmer Jr. (January 12, 1920 – July 9, 1999) was an American civil rights activist and leader in the Civil Rights Movement "who pushed for nonviolent protest to dismantle segregation, and served alongside Martin Luther King Jr." In 1942 he was a co-founder of what became known as CORE, or the Congress of Racial Equality. He was the initiator and organizer of the first Freedom Ride in 1961, which eventually led to the desegregation of interstate transportation in the United States.

As a young man, Farmer had co-founded the Committee of Racial Equality in Chicago along with George Houser, James R. Robinson, Samuel E. Riley, Bernice Fisher, Homer Jack, and Joe Guinn. It was later dedicated to ending racial segregation in the United States through nonviolence. Farmer served as the national chairman from 1942 to 1944.

By the 1960s, Farmer was known as "one of the Big Four civil rights leaders in the 1960s, together with King, NAACP chief Roy Wilkins and Urban League head Whitney Young."

== Biography ==
James L. Farmer Jr. was born and raised in Marshall, Texas, at a time when racial discrimination was law throughout the Southern States. His father James K. Farmer Sr was a Methodist minister and also taught at Wiley College in town.

When Farmer was ten, his Uncle Fred, Aunt Helen, and cousin Muriel came down to visit from New York. They had no trouble getting a sleeping compartment on the train down but were worried about getting one on the way back. Trains in Texas were segregated and often blacks had to accept lesser accommodations.

Farmer went to the train station with his dad who arranged the return trip. His father convinced the manager to give his uncle a room in the sleeping car, but the boy realized that his dad had lied about the facts. He was shocked. On the way back home, his father said, "I had to tell that lie about your Uncle Fred. That was the only way we could get the reservation. The Lord will forgive me." Farmer decided to dedicate his life to ending segregation.

Farmer was a child prodigy; in 1934, at the age of 14, he enrolled as a freshman at Wiley College. The historically black college was affiliated with the Methodist Church. Farmer was selected as a member of the debate team. Melvin B. Tolson, a professor of English, became his mentor. Farmer's experiences on the Wiley College debate team were dramatized in the film The Great Debaters, in which he was portrayed by Denzel Whitaker.

== Adult life ==
At the age of 21, Farmer was invited to the White House to talk with President Franklin D. Roosevelt. Eleanor Roosevelt signed the invitation. Before the talk with the president, Mrs. Roosevelt talked to the group. Farmer took a liking to her immediately, and the two of them monopolized the conversation. When the group went in to talk to President Roosevelt, Mrs. Roosevelt followed and sat in the back. After the formalities were done, the young people were allowed to ask questions. Farmer said, "On your opening remarks you described Britain and France as champions of freedom. In light of their colonial policies in Africa, which give the lie to the principle, how can they be considered defenders?" The president tactfully avoided the question. Mrs Roosevelt spoke up, saying, "Just a minute, you did not answer the question!" Although the president still did not answer the question as Farmer phrased it, Farmer was placated, knowing that he had gotten the question out there.

Farmer earned a Bachelor of Science degree at Wiley College in 1938, and a Bachelor of Divinity degree from Howard University School of Religion in 1941. At Wiley, Farmer became anguished over segregation, recalling particular occasions of racism he had witnessed or suffered in his younger days. During the Second World War, Farmer gained official status as a conscientious objector.

Inspired by Howard Thurman, a professor of theology at Howard University, Farmer became interested in Gandhi-style pacifism. Martin Luther King Jr. also studied Gandhi and adopted many of his principles.

Farmer started to think about how to stop racist practices in the United States while working at the Fellowship of Reconciliation, which he joined after college.

During the 1950s, Farmer served as national secretary of the Student League for Industrial Democracy (SLID), the youth branch of the socialist League for Industrial Democracy. After 1960, SLID became known as Students for a Democratic Society.

== Marriage and family ==
Farmer married Winnie Christie in 1945. Winnie became pregnant soon after they were married. When she found a provocative note from a girl in one of Farmer's coat pockets, she was outraged at him. She suffered a miscarriage, and the couple divorced not long afterward.

A few years later, Farmer married Lula A. Peterson. She had been diagnosed with Hodgkin's disease. The two were advised against having children, as pregnancy was thought to exacerbate cancer. Years later, they sought a second opinion. At that time, Lula was encouraged to try to have children. She first had a miscarriage but then had a daughter, Tami Lynn Farmer, born on February 14, 1959. A second daughter, Abbey Farmer, was born in 1962.

== Founding CORE ==
James Farmer later recalled:

I talked to A. J. Muste, executive director of the Fellowship of Reconciliation (FOR), about an idea to combat racial inequality. Muste found the idea promising but wanted to see it in writing. I spent months writing the memorandum making sure it was perfect. A. J. Muste wrote me back asking me about money to fund it and how they would get members. Finally, I was asked to propose my idea in front of the FOR National Council. In the end, FOR chose not to sponsor the group, but they gave me permission to start the group in Chicago. When Farmer got back to Chicago, the group began setting up the organization. The name they picked was CORE, the Committee of Racial Equality. The name was changed about a year later to the Congress of Racial Equality.

In an interview with Robert Penn Warren in 1964 for the book Who Speaks for the Negro?, Farmer described the founding principles of CORE as follows:

1. that it involves the people themselves rather than experts,
2. that it rejects segregation, and
3. that it does so through nonviolent direct action.

Jack Spratt was a local diner in Chicago that would not serve colored people. CORE decided to do a large-scale sit in where they would occupy all available seats. Twenty-eight persons entered Jack Spratt in groups, with at least one black person in each group. No one who was served would eat until the black people were served, or they gave their plate to the black person nearest them. The other customers, already in the diner, did the same. The manager told them that they would serve the colored customers in the basement, but the group declined. Then it was proposed that all the colored people sit in the back corner and get served there, again the group declined. Finally, the establishment called the police. When the police entered, they refused to kick the CORE group out. Having no other options, the restaurant finally served all patrons in the same area. Afterward, CORE did tests at Jack Spratt and found that the diner's policy had continued to serve all customers.

The White City Roller Skating Rink allowed only white patrons. Its staff made excuses to blacks as to why they could not enter. For example, white CORE members were allowed to enter the rink, but black members were refused because of "a private party". Having documented that the rink was lying about the circumstances, CORE decided to sue them. When the case went to trial, a state lawyer conducted the prosecution, rather than the county. The judge ruled in favor of the rink. Although the outcome of the case was a setback for CORE, the group was making a name for itself.

== Freedom Rides ==
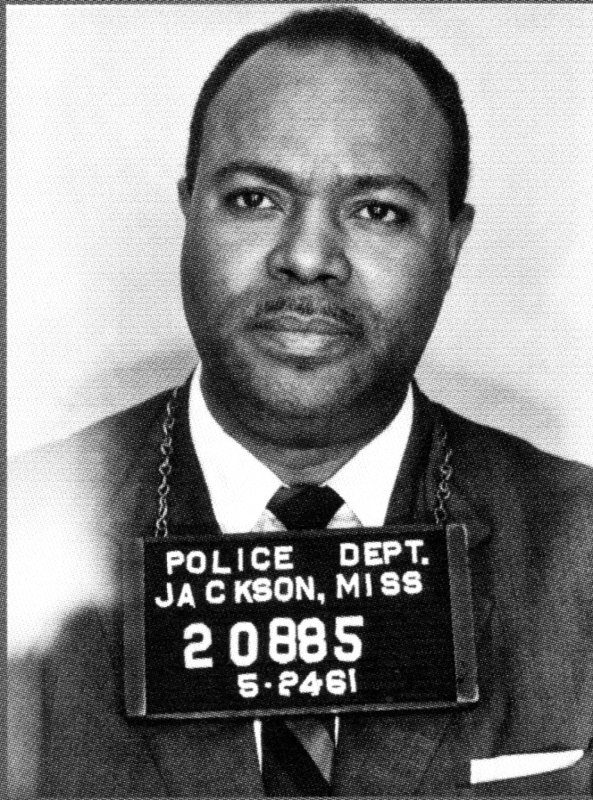
Booking photo from 1961

In 1961, Farmer, who was working for the NAACP, was reelected as the national director of CORE, as the civil rights movement was gaining power. Although the United States Supreme Court in Morgan v. Commonwealth of Virginia, 328 U.S. 373 (1946) had ruled that segregated interstate bus travel was unconstitutional, and reiterated that in Boynton v. Virginia (1960), Southern states had continued to enforce segregation on buses within their territories.

Gordon Carey proposed the idea of a second Journey of Reconciliation and Farmer jumped at the idea. This time, the group planned to journey through the Deep South. Farmer coined a new name for the trip: the Freedom Ride.

External videos
- "Interview with James Farmer" conducted in 1985 for the Eyes on the Prize documentary in which he discusses his work in the Congress of Racial Equality (CORE), the sit-ins, the Freedom Rides, and debates within the movement over the commitment to non-violence.

They planned for a mixed-race and -gender group to test segregation on interstate buses. The group would be trained extensively on nonviolent tactics in Washington, D.C., and embark on May 4, 1961: half by each of the two major carriers, Greyhound Bus Company and Trailways. They would ride through Virginia, the Carolinas, Georgia, Alabama, Mississippi, and finish in New Orleans on May 17. They also planned to challenge segregated seating in bus stations and lunch rooms. For overnight stops they planned rallies and support from the black community, and scheduled talks at local churches or colleges.

On May 4, the participants began. The trip down through Virginia, the Carolinas and Georgia went smoothly enough. The states knew about the trip and facilities either took down the "Colored" and "White Only" signs, or didn't enforce the segregation laws. Before the group made it to Alabama, the most dangerous part of the Freedom Ride, Farmer had to return home because his father died.

In Alabama, the other riders were severely beaten and abused at a stop, and they narrowly escaped death when their bus was firebombed. With the bus destroyed, they flew to New Orleans instead of finishing the ride.

Diane Nash and other members of the Nashville Student Movement and SNCC quickly recruited college students to restart the Freedom Ride where the first had left off. Farmer rejoined the group in Montgomery, Alabama. Doris Castle persuaded him to get on the bus at the last minute. The Riders were met with severe violence; in Birmingham the sheriff allowed local KKK members several minutes to attack the Riders. They badly injured a photographer covering events. The violent reactions and events attracted national media attention.

The group's efforts sparked a summer of similar rides by other Civil Rights leaders and thousands of ordinary citizens. In Jackson, Mississippi, the state capital, Farmer and the other riders were immediately arrested and jailed, but law enforcement prevented violence. The riders followed a "jail no bail" philosophy to try to fill the jails with protesters and attract media attention. From county and town jails, the riders were sent to harsher conditions at Parchman State Penitentiary.

As the Freedom Rides were attacked by whites, news coverage became widespread, and included photographs, newspaper accounts, and motion pictures. The Congress of Racial Equality and segregation and civil rights became national issues. Farmer became well known as a civil-rights leader. The Freedom Rides inspired Erin Gruwell's teaching techniques and the Freedom Writers Foundation.

The following year, 1963, civil rights groups, supplemented by hundreds of college students from the North, worked with local activists in Mississippi on voter education and registration. James Chaney, Andrew Goodman and Michael Schwerner, all of whom Farmer had helped recruit for CORE, disappeared during the Mississippi Freedom Summer. A full-scale FBI investigation aided by other law enforcement, found their murdered corpses buried in an earthen dam.

These events later were the basis for the 1988 feature movie, Mississippi Burning. Years later, recalling Freedom Summer, Farmer said, "Anyone who said he wasn't afraid during the civil rights movement was either a liar or without imagination. I think we were all scared. I was scared all the time. My hand didn't shake but inside I was shaking."

== Later career ==
In 1963, Louisiana state troopers hunted for Farmer door to door for trying to organize protests. A funeral home director had Farmer play dead in the back of a hearse that carried him along back roads and out of town. He was arrested that August for disturbing the peace.

As the Director of CORE, Farmer was considered one of the "Big Six" of the Civil Rights Movement who helped organize the March on Washington for Jobs and Freedom in 1963. (The press also used the term "Big Four", ignoring John Lewis and Dorothy Height.) Growing disenchanted with emerging militancy and black nationalist sentiments in CORE, Farmer resigned as director in 1966. By that time, Congress had passed the Civil Rights Act of 1964, ending legal segregation, and the Voting Rights Act of 1965, authorizing federal enforcement of registration and elections.

Farmer took a teaching position at Lincoln University, a historically black college (HBCU) near Philadelphia, Pennsylvania. He also lectured around the country. In 1968, Farmer ran for U.S. Congress as a Liberal Party candidate backed by the Republican Party, but lost to Shirley Chisholm.

In 1969, the newly elected Republican President Richard Nixon offered Farmer the position of Assistant Secretary of the Department of Health, Education, and Welfare (now Health and Human Services). The next year, frustrated by the Washington bureaucracy, Farmer resigned from the position.

Farmer retired from politics in 1971 but remained active, lecturing and serving on various boards and committees. He was one of the signers of the Humanist Manifesto II in 1973. In 1975, he co-founded Fund for an Open Society. Its vision is a nation in which people live in stably integrated communities, where political and civic power is shared by people of different races and ethnicities. He led this organization until 1999.

Farmer was named an honorary vice chairman of the Democratic Socialists of America.

He published his autobiography Lay Bare the Heart in 1985. In 1984, Farmer began teaching at Mary Washington College (now The University of Mary Washington) in Fredericksburg, Virginia.

Farmer retired from his teaching position in 1998. He died on July 9, 1999, of complications from diabetes in Fredericksburg, Virginia at the age of 79.

== Legacy and honors ==
- A bust of Farmer was installed on the campus of Mary Washington College.
- In 1987, Mary Washington College created the James Farmer Scholars program, to encourage minority students to enroll in college.
- In 1995, the City of Marshall renamed Barney Street, where Farmer grew up, as James Farmer Street in honor of him and his father.
- In 1998, President Bill Clinton awarded Farmer the Presidential Medal of Freedom.

Freedom and equality are inherent rights in the United States: therefore, I encourage young people to take on the task by standing up and speaking out on behalf of people denied those rights. We have not yet finished the job of making our country whole

— Quote chiseled in stone at his memorial at the University of Mary Washington, Fredericksburg, Virginia.

- In 2012, the Library of Virginia named Farmer as one of its inaugural honorees in its "Strong Men and Women" series of African American trailblazers.
- In 2020, the University of Mary Washington renamed the former Trinkle Hall to James Farmer Hall in honor of Dr. Farmer, who spent his final years as a professor of history at the university.

== Works ==
- Lay Bare the Heart: An Autobiography of the Civil Rights Movement. James Farmer, Penguin-Plume, 1986 ISBN 0-452-25803-0
- He wrote Religion and Racism but it has not been published.
- Freedom-When was published in 1965.

Several issues of Fellowship magazine of the Fellowship of Reconciliation in 1992 (Spring, Summer and Winter issues) contained discussions by Farmer and George Houser about the founding of CORE. A conference at Bluffton College in Bluffton, Ohio, on October 22, 1992, Erasing the Color Line in the North, explored CORE and its origins. Both Houser and Farmer attended. Academics and the participants unanimously agreed that the founders of CORE were James Farmer, George Houser and Bernice Fisher. The conference has been preserved on videotape available from Bluffton College.

== See also ==
- List of civil rights leaders

== Further research ==
Archival materials

- James Leonard Jr. and Lula Peterson Farmer Papers. University of Texas Libraries. Accessed 2014.
- James Farmer Lectures at University of Mary Washington
- University of Mary Washington James Farmer Oral History Project
- Oral History Interviews with James Farmer, from the Lyndon Baines Johnson Library
- FBI file on James Farmer

Videos

- Dr. James Farmer Jr. Civil Rights Documentary "The Good Fight" Fascinates And Educates, Movie Review from ShortFilmTexas.com
- You Don't Have to Ride Jim Crow! New Hampshire Public Television/American Public Television documentary of the Journey of Reconciliation
- Eyes on the Prize Blackside, Inc./PBS documentary of the Civil Rights Movement (Episode 3 is the Freedom Rides)
- Freedom Riders 50th anniversary documentary, PBS's American Experience
- James Farmer on the WGBH series The Ten O'Clock News
- The short film OPEN MIND Special: Race Relations in Crisis 6/12/63 – 11/13/92 (1963/1992) is available for free viewing and download at the Internet Archive.
