= George Houser =

Activist for African-American civil rights and African independence (1916–2015)

- Born: June 2, 1916; Cleveland, Ohio, United States
- Died: August 19, 2015 (aged 99); Santa Rosa, California, United States
- Education: Union Theological Seminary
- Occupations: Methodist minister, activist
- Known for: Co-founder of Congress of Racial Equality (CORE)

George Mills Houser (June 2, 1916 – August 19, 2015) was an American Methodist minister, civil rights activist, and activist for the independence of African nations. He served on the staff of the Fellowship of Reconciliation (1940s–1950s).

With James Farmer and Bernice Fisher, he co-founded the Congress of Racial Equality (CORE) in 1942 in Chicago. With Bayard Rustin, another FOR staffer, Houser co-led the Journey of Reconciliation, a form of nonviolent direct action, a two-week interracial bus journey challenging segregation. It was a model for the 1961 Freedom Rides that CORE and the Nashville Student Movement later organized through the Deep South.

== Early life and education ==
George Houser was born in 1916 in Cleveland, Ohio, to parents who were Methodist missionaries, and as a child, he spent several years with them in the Far East, largely in the Philippines. After studying at what is now the University of the Pacific in Stockton, California, the young Houser completed his undergraduate work at the University of Denver. He then attended Union Theological Seminary, where he served as chairman of the school's social action commission. Houser, along with David Dellinger, was among 20 Union students who announced publicly that they would defy the Selective Training and Service Act of 1940. In November 1940 Houser was arrested for refusing to be drafted. He served a year in jail.

After college, Houser was ordained as a Methodist minister. He soon became involved in movements for social justice and civil rights.

== Career ==
Houser joined the Fellowship of Reconciliation in the 1940s and worked with it until the 1950s. It sponsored education and activities related to civil rights for African Americans and the end of segregation.

In 1942, with fellow staffer James Farmer, activist Bernice Fisher and James Robinson, Houser co-founded the Congress of Racial Equality (CORE) in Chicago. He served as its first executive secretary. Farmer, Bayard Rustin and Houser were all influenced at this time by Krishnalal Shridharani's Columbia University doctoral thesis published in 1939 as War Without Violence. Shridharani was secretary to Gandhi and codified Mohandas Karamchand Gandhi's organizing techniques and ideas on nonviolent civil disobedience. They decided to apply the same methods in their work for civil rights. Houser's codification of Shridharani's rules enabled CORE to engage in nonviolent actions. In 1946 Houser, along with Dave Dellinger, Igal Roodenko, Lew Hill, and others, helped found the radical pacifist Committee for Nonviolent Revolution.

In 1947, after the US Supreme Court's finding (in Morgan v. Commonwealth) that segregation in interstate travel was unconstitutional, Houser helped organize the Journey of Reconciliation. This was a plan to send eight white and eight black men on a journey through Virginia, North Carolina, Tennessee, and Kentucky to test the ruling. The protest brought a great deal of press attention to CORE and to the issue of segregation in interstate travel. In February 1948 George Houser received the Thomas Jefferson Award for his work to bring an end to segregation on interstate buses and in their facilities.

In 1948, Houser was the secretary of the Resist Conscription Committee. He described the RCC as a temporary group of pacifists, whose purpose was to gather names of people who were willing to resist conscription. The group circulated a statement which read, in part:

Conscription fails to prevent war, foments further warlike preparation by our opponents, and denies fundamental freedoms of the individual necessary to democracy. This violates our deepest convictions that no person should be forcibly coerced into adopting a military way of life. We believe human beings are fit for something better, something nobler than slavery and training in the mass extermination of their fellows.

In 1949, Houser moved to Skyview Acres, an intentional community in Pomona, New York. In 2010, he received the Republic of South Africa’s Oliver R. Tambo Award. In the same year he moved to California, where he lived until his death. Houser died on August 19, 2015, at the age of 99 in Santa Rosa, California.

== African independence movements ==
Houser left the FOR in the 1950s, when he turned his attention to African liberation struggles. Nations were seeking independence from colonial rulers. Houser led the American Committee on Africa for many years, spending decades on the continent to promote freedom from colonial rule and segregation.

In 1952 he helped found "Americans for South African Resistance" (AFSAR) to organize support in the U.S. for the ANC-led Defiance Campaign against apartheid in South Africa. He was a founder in 1953 of the American Committee on Africa (ACOA), which grew out of AFSAR. In 1954 he took his first trip to Africa, visiting West Africa and South Africa. In 1960, as president of ACOA, Houser sent a telegram to Dwight Eisenhower urging him to officially condemn the treatment of Africans by South Africa. Because of his continuing activities for independence and against apartheid, Houser was not permitted to enter South Africa again until 1991, after the end of the apartheid government.

From 1955 to 1981, Houser served as Executive Director of the ACOA; he also was Executive Director of The Africa Fund from 1966 to 1981. At ACOA, he spearheaded numerous campaigns supporting African struggles for liberation and independence, from Algeria to Zimbabwe. In an interview in 2004, he reflected on his work with ACOA and the transcript was published in the book No Easy Victories.

From 1954 to 2015, he made more than 30 trips to Africa. His support of liberation movements led him to develop close ties with many African leaders, including Nelson Mandela, Walter Sisulu, Amílcar Cabral, Julius Nyerere, Eduardo Mondlane, Kwame Nkrumah, and Oliver Tambo.

Houser served on the Advisory Committee of the African Activist Archive Project.

== Personal life and death ==
Houser married and raised four children with his wife, Jean. His son, Steven, previously taught history at Horace Greeley High School in Chappaqua, New York, and now teaches World Civilizations at Grand Valley State University. His grandson, Chris, taught at Scarsdale High School. Houser died on August 19, 2015, at the age of 99 in Santa Rosa, California.

== Selected works ==
- No One Can Stop The Rain: Glimpses of Africa's Liberation Struggle (New York: Pilgrim Press, 1989)
- With Herbert Shore, I Will Go Singing: Walter Sisulu Speaks of his Life and the Struggle for Freedom in South Africa (Cape Town: Robben Island Museum, 2000).
- Frazier, Nishani (2017). Harambee City: Congress of Racial Equality in Cleveland and the Rise of Black Power Populism. University of Arkansas Press. ISBN 1682260186
