= Sundari K. Shridharani =

Indian performing artist

- Born: 6 April 1925; Hyderabad, Sindh
- Died: 7 April 2012 (aged 87); New Delhi
- Known for: Triveni Kala Sangam
- Spouse: Krishnalal Shridharani

Sundari K. Shridharani (6 April 1925 – 7 April 2012) was the founder and director of Triveni Kala Sangam, a multi-arts institution, which she established in 1950.

== Early life and background ==
Born in Hyderabad, Sindh, in undivided India, Shridharani started learning dance while at Santiniketan, thereafter she joined the Uday Shankar at Indian Cultural Centre, at Almora, where she trained in Kathakali under Guru Shankaran Namboodiri and in Manipuri dance under Guru Amubi Singh. Subsequently, she joined Ginner Mawer School of Dance and Drama, London, where she learnt Greek dance. She married Krishnalal Shridharani (1911 – 1960), a poet, playwright and journalist.

== Career ==
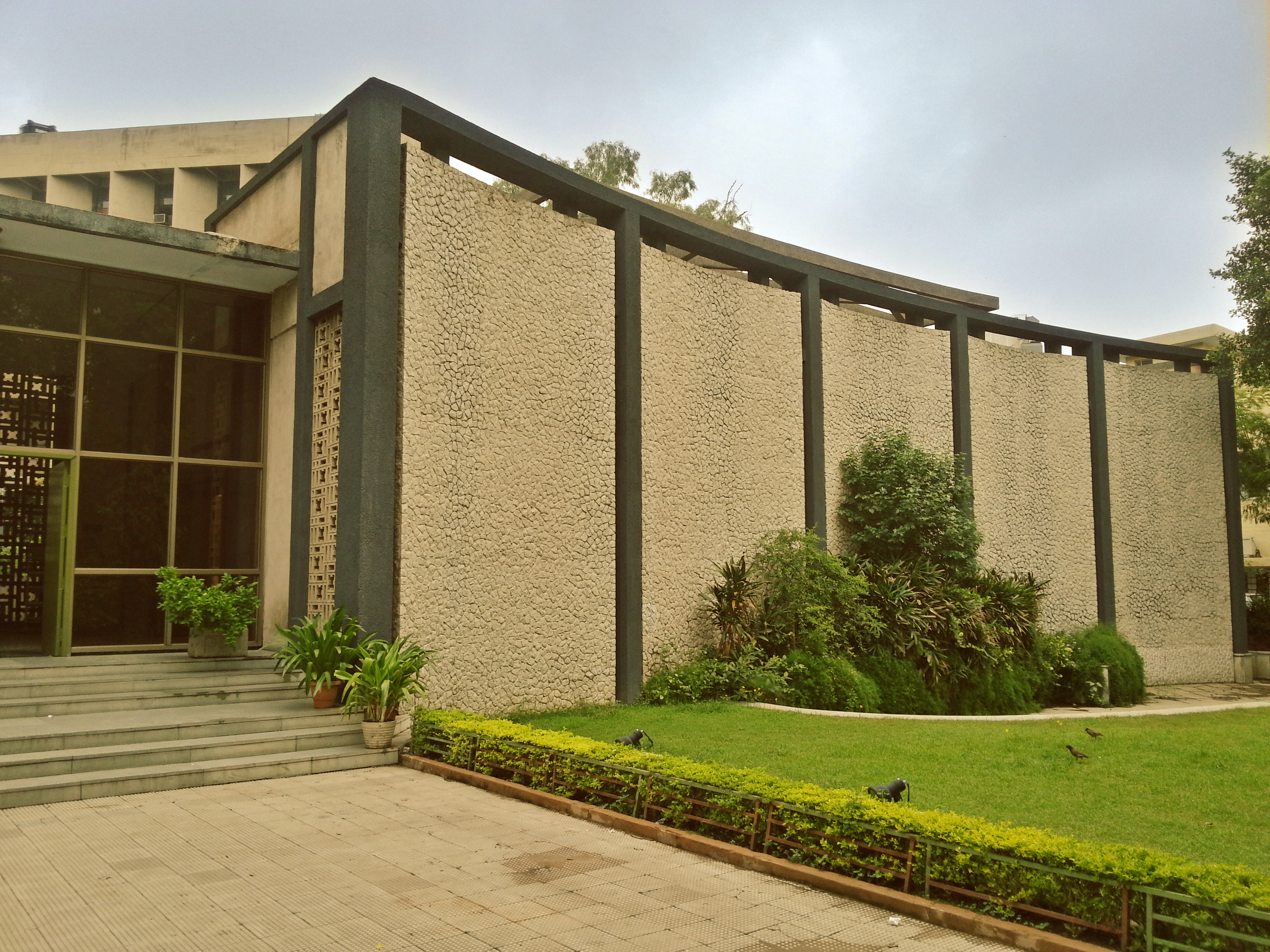
Main entrance of Triveni Kala Sangam and Shridharani Art Gallery facade on the left.

In 1947, she performed at the first International Youth Festival in Prague, and in the 1950s, she received a Fulbright Fellowship and also of the University of California, Los Angeles, through which travelled across several universities in US, giving lecture-demonstrations of Indian dances.

She moved to Delhi after her marriage, and in 1950 started Triveni Kal Sangam. It started in one room and terrace above a Coffee House in Connaught Place, Delhi, with two students under noted artist K. S. Kulkarni. Soon her efforts got noticed, and Pandit Nehru allotted her the half acre land for the institution. Gradually, she organized a small group of people, started organizing concerts, and collecting funds. Finally construction began around 1957 and eventually on 3 March 1963, the present building was inaugurated.

She lived within the premises of Triveni, and died on 7 April 2012 in New Delhi, aged 93.

== Awards and recognition ==
She was awarded the Padma Shri by Government of India in 1992. She was awarded the Sangeet Natak Akademi Award for her overall contribution to the performing arts in 2011, which was awarded posthumously.
