= Lay Bare the Heart =

Lay Bare the Heart: An Autobiography of the Civil Rights Movement is a 1985 non-fiction book by James Farmer, published by Arbor House in 1985. A subsequent edition is published by Texas Christian University Press. The book documents Farmer's role in the civil rights movement.

== Background ==
Circa 1966 he began organizing his notes that would be used to make an autobiography.

== Content ==
The book has descriptions of Malcolm X and Martin Luther King.

"Intellectual Coming of Age," the fourth part, describes how the Harlem Renaissance and the Civil rights movement developed creative and intellectual life.

"God and Goddamn," the twelfth chapter, describes how Farmer navigated social life in Washington, DC.

== Reception ==
Reviewer Beth Brown wrote that the work is "highly emotional, yet coolly accurate and objective".

David Levering Lewis of Rutgers University wrote that the book is "strikingly human", and that it has "an appearance of honesty" and "extraordinary eloquence and emotional power."

It won the Lillian Smith Book Award in 1985.
