= Congress of Racial Equality =

Civil rights organization in the United States

- CORE information
- Abbreviation: CORE
- Formation: 1942; 84 years ago
- Legal status: Currently active
- Purpose: To bring about equality for all people regardless of race, creed, sex, age, disability, sexual orientation, religion or ethnic background.
- Headquarters: Las Vegas, Nevada, United States
- Website: thecongressofracialequality.org

The Congress of Racial Equality (CORE) is an African-American civil rights organization in the United States that played a pivotal role for African Americans in the civil rights movement. Founded in 1942, its stated mission is "to bring about equality for all people regardless of race, creed, sex, age, disability, sexual orientation, religion or ethnic background". To combat discriminatory policies regarding interstate travel, CORE participated in Freedom Rides as college students boarded Greyhound Buses headed for the Deep South. As the influence of the organization grew, so did the number of chapters, eventually expanding all over the country. Under the leadership of Roy Innis from 1968 to his death in 2017, the group moved to the political right and markedly declined in prominence.

== History ==
=== Founding ===
CORE was founded in Chicago, Illinois, in March 1942. The organization's founding members included James Leonard Farmer Jr., Anna Pauline "Pauli" Murray, George Mills Houser, Elsie Bernice Fisher, Homer A. Jack, Robert Chino, and James R. Robinson. Of the 50 original founding members, 28 were men and 22 were women, roughly one-third of them were Black, and the other two-thirds white. Bayard Rustin, while not a founding member of the organization, was, as Farmer and Houser later noted, "an uncle to CORE" and provided it with significant support. The group had evolved out of the pacifist Fellowship of Reconciliation, and sought to apply the principles of nonviolence as a tactic against racial segregation.

The group was inspired by Indian nationalist leader Mahatma Gandhi's support for nonviolent resistance. Indian writer and journalist Krishnalal Shridharani, who was known as a vibrant and theatrical public speaker, had been a protege of Gandhi—being jailed with him in the Salt March—and whose 1939 book War Without Violence heavily influenced the organization. During the period in which CORE was founded, Gandhi's leadership of the independence movement in India against British colonial rule was reaching its apogee. CORE sought to apply the nonviolent anti-colonial tactics pioneered by Gandhi and his followers to successfully challenge racial segregation and racism in the United States through civil disobedience.

In accordance with CORE's constitution and bylaws, in the early and mid-1960s, chapters were organized on a model similar to that of a democratic trade union, with monthly membership meetings, elected and usually unpaid officers, and numerous committees of volunteers. In the South, CORE's nonviolent direct action campaigns opposed "Jim Crow" segregation and job discrimination, and fought for voting rights. Outside the South, CORE focused on discrimination in employment and housing, and also in de facto school segregation. Jim Crow laws are laws that enforce racial segregation and discrimination in the United States.

Some of CORE's main leadership had strong disagreements with the Deacons for Defense and Justice over the Deacons' public threat to racist Southerners that they would use armed self-defense to protect CORE workers from racist organizations, such as the Ku Klux Klan, in Louisiana during the 1960s. Others strongly supported the organization. By the mid-1960s, Farmer tried to incorporate elements of the emerging black nationalist sentiments within CORE—sentiments that, among other things, would quickly lead to an embrace of Black Power. Farmer failed to reconcile these tensions, and he resigned in 1966, but he backed his replacement, Floyd McKissick.

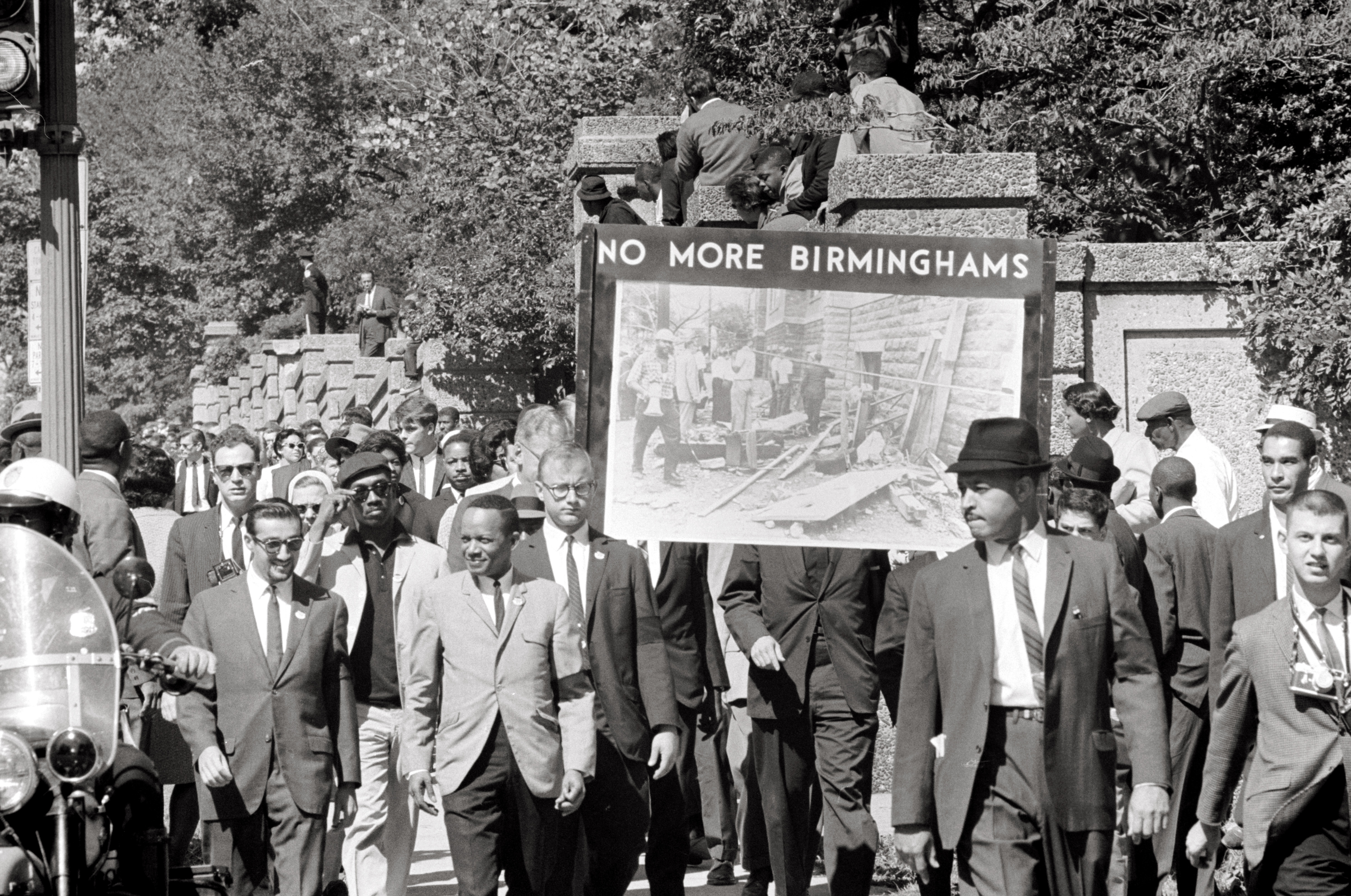
Congress of Racial Equality march in Washington DC, on September 22, 1963, in memory of the children killed in the Birmingham bombings. The banner, which says "No more Birminghams", shows a picture of the aftermath of the bombing.

By 1961 CORE had 53 chapters throughout the United States. By 1963, most of the major urban centers of the Northeast, Midwest, Mid-Atlantic, and West Coast had one or more CORE chapters, including a growing number of chapters on college campuses. In the South, CORE had active chapters and projects in Louisiana, Mississippi, Florida, South Carolina, and Kentucky.

=== Irene Morgan ===
In 1944, Irene Morgan, an African American woman, was arrested for refusing to move from the front "white" seating section to the back "colored" seating section of a Greyhound interstate bus while traveling from Virginia to Maryland. After the Virginia state court upheld her conviction and arrest, Morgan's case was brought before the Supreme Court with Morgan v. Virginia on June 3, 1946.

==== Morgan v. Virginia ====
Initially, Morgan's legal team only included Spottswood Robinson III, but they were later joined by NAACP lawyers Thurgood Marshall and William H. Hastie. They used the Interstate Commerce Clause in the Constitution, which declared that states could not impose rules that interfered with passengers crossing state lines, as the prevailing tactic to argue her case. However, Virginia state courts did not find this argument convincing.

Contrarily, the Supreme Court ruled in favor of Irene and asserted that the Virginia Legislature could not impose segregation among interstate bus travelers. This landmark ruling would go on to inspire CORE members to seek out non-violent ways to push back against segregation outside of the court system.

=== Freedom Rides ===
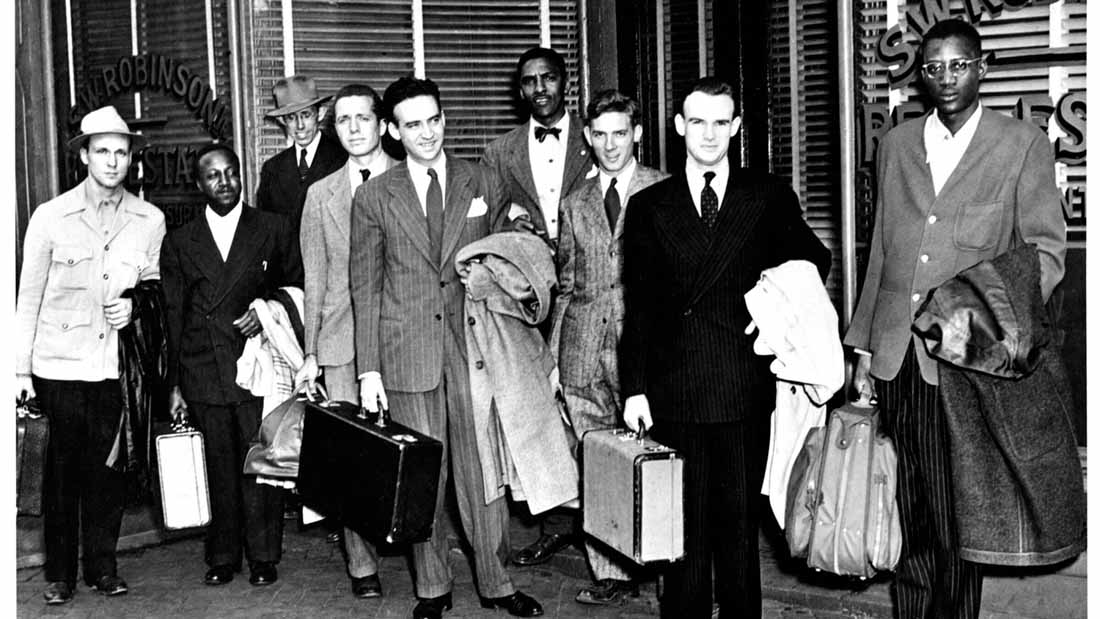
The Journey of Reconciliation, 1947. Left to right: Worth Randle, Wallace Nelson, Ernest Bromley, James Peck, Igal Roodenko, Bayard Rustin, Joseph Felmet, George Houser and Andrew Johnson.

==== Journey of Reconciliation ====
On April 10, 1947, CORE sent a group of eight white men, including James Peck, their publicity officer, and eight black men, on what was to be a two-week Journey of Reconciliation through Virginia, North Carolina, Tennessee, and Kentucky, to test state's compliance with the Supreme Court's decisions regarding segregation within interstate travel.

The group was composed of men only, to get around certain laws of the time that restricted the mixing of males and females. These participants then underwent rigorous training aimed at equipping them with the necessary skills to react non-violently, even in the face of violent behaviors. They would act out intense role-playing exercises to simulate real-life scenarios they may encounter, in an attempt to improve their resolve in the face of violence. Throughout the two-week period, they completed twenty-six demonstrations on buses or trains. Out of these twenty-six demonstrations, six resulted in arrests. The members of this group received a great deal of publicity, and this marked the beginning of a long series of similar campaigns.

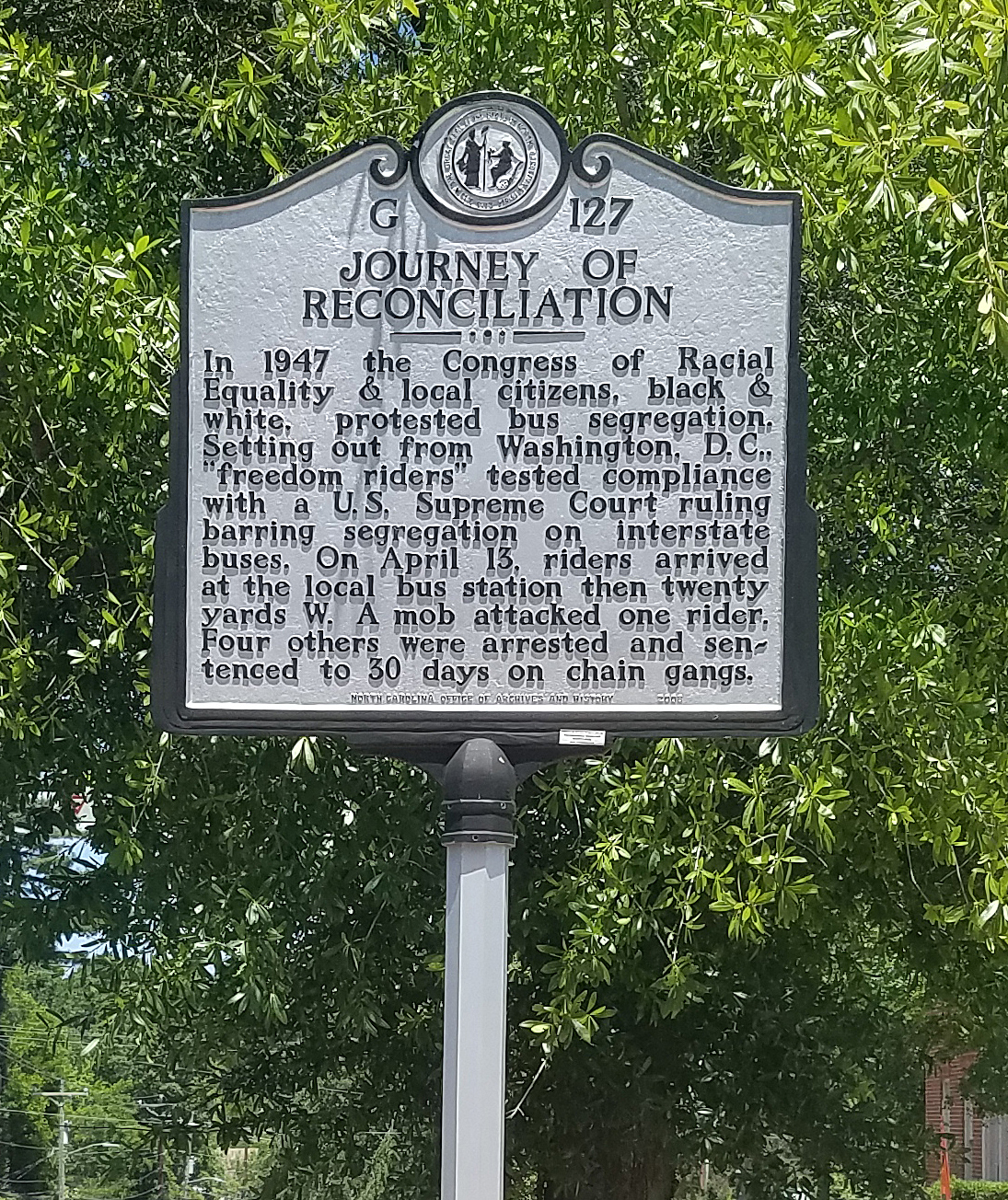
Journey of Reconciliation historic marker, Chapel Hill, NC

After 75 years the North Carolina court vacated the convictions of four freedom fighters from the Journey of Reconciliation. Renee Price, chair of the Orange County Board of Commissioners, learned that the charges against these men arrested in Chapel Hill had never been dropped. "They were arrested and convicted for violating laws that were in fact a violation to humanity, a violation to human dignity and a violation to freedom and justice for all," said Price. She reached out to Orange County Superior Court Judge Allen Baddour, whose office researched the incident and legal cases. On June 17, 2022, Superior Court Judge Allen Baddour vacated and dismissed the charges in a Special Court Session which drew over 100 people into the very courtroom where the men were sentenced.

==== The First "Freedom Ride" ====
In the early 1960s, James Farmer resumed his position as executive secretary of CORE, with the objective of replicating the 1947 Journey of Reconciliation, only this time under a new name - the Freedom Ride.

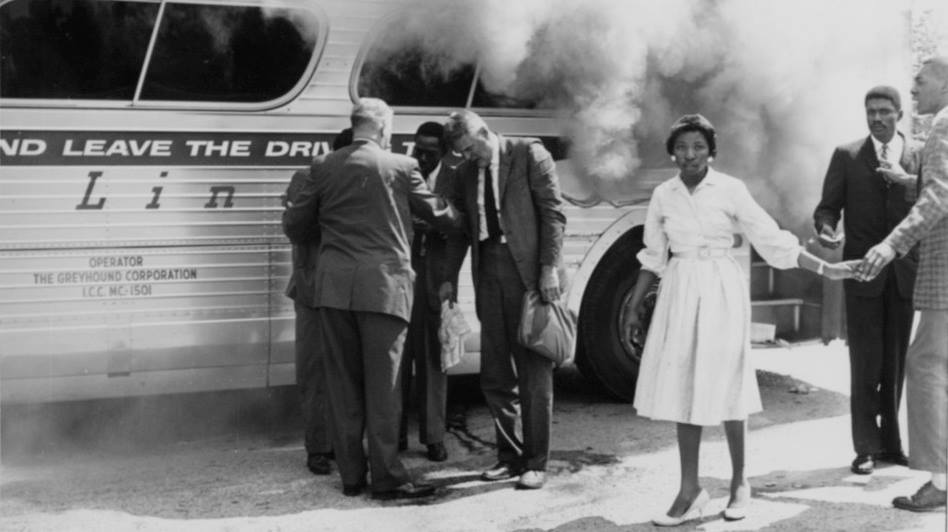
A Greyhound bus burns after being firebombed outside of Anniston, 14 May 1961.

On May 4, 1961, male and female participants started their journey through the deep South, testing segregated bus terminals as well. The riders were met with severe violence. In Anniston, Alabama, one of the buses was fire-bombed and passengers were beaten by a white mob. White mobs also attacked Freedom Riders in Birmingham and Montgomery. The violence garnered national attention, sparking a summer of similar rides by CORE, the Student Nonviolent Coordinating Committee and other civil rights organizations and thousands of ordinary citizens.

=== Desegregating Chicago's schools ===
In the 1960s, the Chicago chapter of CORE began to challenge racial segregation in the Chicago Public Schools, addressing disparities in educational opportunities for African American students. By the late 1950s, the Chicago Board of Education's maintenance of a neighborhood school policy had resulted in a pattern of racial segregation. Predominantly black schools were situated in predominantly black neighborhoods on the south and west sides of the city, while predominantly white schools were located in predominantly white areas in the north, northwest and southwest sides of Chicago.

Many predominantly black schools were very overcrowded. To ease overcrowding, the board instated double shifts at some schools, which helped with the overcrowding but provided new issues. Double shifts meant that students in affected schools attended less than a full day of class. In another measure to alleviate overcrowding at some schools, the school board approved the construction of mobile classroom units. Moreover, a significant proportion of students dropped out before finishing high school. Many teachers in predominantly black schools lacked full-time teaching experience compared to teachers in white schools. In addition, the history curriculum did not mention African Americans. According to CORE, "school segregation [was] a damaging bacteria, a psychological handicap, which [festered] a disease generating widespread unemployment and crime in Chicago".

Between 1960 and 1963, CORE wrote letters addressing the conditions of schools to various authorities, including the Board of Education (led by Superintendent Benjamin Willis), Mayor Richard J. Daley, the Illinois House of Representatives, and the U.S. Department of Health, Education, and Welfare, advocating for improvements in educational equality. In addition, CORE attended the school board's budget hearings, speaking against segregation and asking for the board to implement transfer plans to desegregate the schools. In July 1963, CORE staged a week-long sit-in and protest at the board office in downtown Chicago in response to the board's inaction. Finally, Board President Claire Roddewig and Willis agreed to meet with CORE to negotiate integration, but no significant changes came to the schools.

During the mid-1960s, CORE turned towards community involvement, seeking to equip Chicagoans with ways to challenge segregation. Freedom Houses, transfer petitions, community rallies and meetings served to educate Chicagoans about segregation and provide them with tools to circumnavigate the neighborhood school policy.

By 1966, the Chicago Freedom Movement, led by Martin Luther King Jr., the Southern Christian Leadership Conference (SCLC) and Chicago's Coordinating Council of Community Organizations (CCCO), had assumed control over civil rights demonstrations and negotiations. While CORE was a member organization of the CCCO, it increasingly lost influence over desegregation efforts. And when the Chicago Freedom Movement met with representatives of the city to negotiate in the summer of 1966, they agreed on ten fair housing reforms but did not discuss reforms to desegregate the schools. While CORE played no role in the housing summit, it had shifted towards promoting and developing Black power in Chicago. By the fall of 1966, CORE was no longer a civil rights organization, but a Black power organization. Changes in CORE's national leadership and continued inaction on behalf of the Board to desegregate the schools pushed CORE towards separatism and away from desegregation efforts. The chapter collapsed in October 1968.

=== Desegregating Durham ===
In 1962, CORE set up a headquarters in Durham, North Carolina where upon arrival, local black women activists, including Sadie Sawyer Hughley, welcomed them into their homes. CORE worked with the local NAACP to organize pickets at Eckerd's Drug Store and Howard Johnson's. The goals were to increase employment opportunities for black workers and integrate local restaurants.

=== March on Washington ===
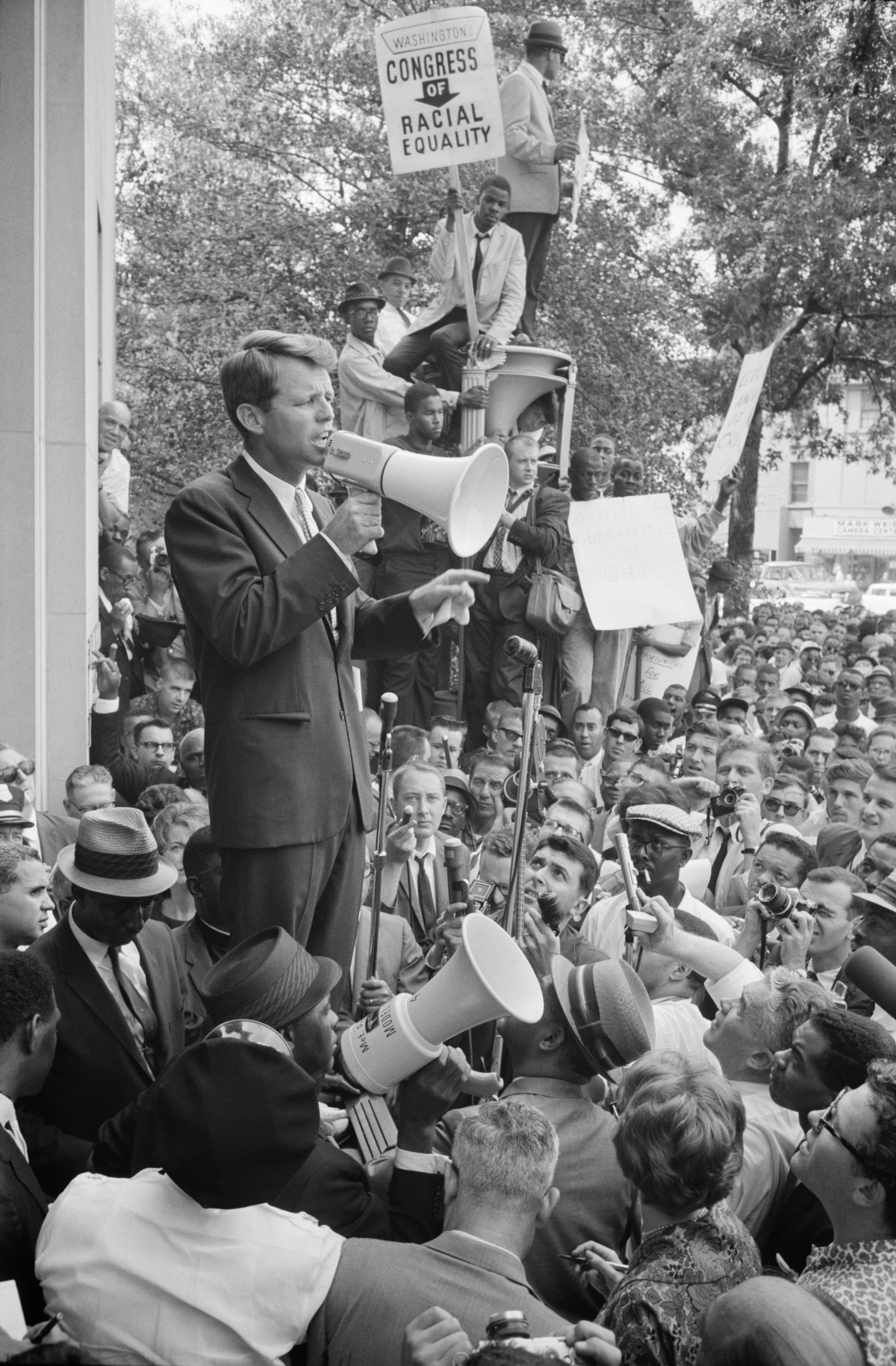
A CORE sign displayed as Robert F. Kennedy speaks to a crowd outside the Department of Justice Building in June 1963

In 1963, the organization helped organize the famous March on Washington. On August 28, 1963, more than 250,000 people marched peacefully to the Lincoln Memorial to demand equal justice for all citizens under the law. At the end of the march Martin Luther King Jr. made his famous "I Have a Dream" speech.

=== "Freedom Summer" ===
The following year, CORE along with the Student Nonviolent Coordinating Committee (SNCC) and the National Association for the Advancement of Colored People (NAACP) helped organize the "Freedom Summer" campaign—aimed principally at ending the political disenfranchisement of African Americans in the Deep South. Operating under the umbrella coalition of the Council of Federated Organizations (COFO), volunteers from the three organizations concentrated their efforts in Mississippi. In 1962 only 6.7 percent of African Americans in the state were registered to vote, the lowest percentage in the country. This involved the formation of the Mississippi Freedom Democratic Party (MFDP). Over 80,000 people joined the party and 68 delegates attended the Democratic Party Convention in Atlantic City and challenged the attendance of the all-white Mississippi representation.

CORE, SNCC, and COFO collaborated to establish 30 Freedom Schools in towns across Mississippi. As a group, the three organizations collected volunteers that taught in the schools and the curriculum now included black history, the philosophy of the civil rights movement. During the summer of 1964 over 3,000 students attended these schools and the experiment provided a model for future educational programs such as Head Start.

Freedom Schools were often targets of white mobs. So also were the homes of local African Americans involved in the campaign. That summer 30 black homes and 37 black churches were firebombed. Over 80 volunteers were beaten by white mobs or racist police officers. Three CORE activists, James Chaney, Andrew Goodman and Michael Schwerner, were murdered by the Ku Klux Klan on June 21, 1964 (see Murders of Chaney, Goodman, and Schwerner). These deaths created nationwide publicity for the campaign.

=== Louisiana Chapter of CORE and The Support for Armed Self-Defense ===
CORE, at its heart, is an organization dedicated to non-violent philosophies and practices. In Louisiana, efforts were being made to increase voter registration among rural communities. Though their motives were noble, there was no national attention or support gathering around the work of the Louisiana members. As such, acts of violence or harassment against them often went unreported and the victims were not supported by the public. Compounding this issue, both the national and local government felt no responsibility to protect these members or supply federal intervention. These underlying issues in Louisiana stirred up support among local CORE members for the idea of allowing armed self-defense within their ranks.

The idea of armed-self defense would be supported by CORE co-founder James Farmer after an incident in Plaquemine, Louisiana. On September 1, 1963, local police of Plaqumine threatened to lynch Farmer after a CORE demonstration in the city turned violent. As a result, he had to be smuggled out of the city accompanied by two armed men. After this event, Farmer would go on to permit armed guards to attend CORE meetings.

=== Brooklyn Chapter of CORE ===
In New York City, the Brooklyn chapter of CORE was seen as one of the most radical chapters of CORE. This chapter employed increasingly aggressive tactics with a focus on racial discrimination. Primarily, the Brooklyn chapter of CORE used community-based activism which made it one of the most influential chapters in history. In 1964, the group held a Stall-In, deliberately preventing the flow of traffic to the World Fair with the goal of drawing attention to racial discrimination, which was one of their main focuses. Brooklyn's CORE's aggressive tactics would cause it to be suspended from the National CORE groups.

Brooklyn's CORE used the slogan "Jim Crow Must Go" to raise awareness about the unequal schooling that African American children faced at this time as well as the overall unequal treatment of African Americans. While this slogan was typically associated with the south because they had Jim Crow Laws, using it in the north allowed Brooklyn's CORE leaders to gain public acknowledgement that the north also had racial discrimination issues, just as the south did.

=== Cleveland Chapter of CORE ===
The Cleveland chapter of CORE was heavily involved in the fight against racial segregation in Cleveland Public Schools. They partnered with the United Freedom Movement (UFM) led sit-ins, picketing, and obstructed the construction of new schools. Ruth Turner and other activists with the Cleveland chapter protested the construction of a new school by laying in excavation ditches, leading to the injury and death of Reverend Bruce W. Klunder in 1964, vice president of CORE. After his death, Black students participated in a boycott of Cleveland Public Schools, with 85-95% staying home on April 20, 1964. The efforts of UFM and CORE eventually led to the desegregation of Cleveland's schools in the case Reed v. Rhodes on August 31, 1976.

=== Kentucky Chapter of CORE ===
==== Beginning of CORE in Kentucky ====
CORE made significant strides in the civil rights movement in Kentucky, establishing its first chapter in Lexington in 1959. This chapter went on to be the strongest and longest-lasting chapter in Kentucky history. With other branches established in Louisville, Frankfort, Richmond, and Covington, CORE often collaborated with the NAACP and also other organizations that were a part of the same movement. One of the most notable collaborations with the NAACP was the successful challenge against Louisville's residential segregation ordinance in the case Buchanan v. Warley on November 5, 1917.

This victory marked a big turning point in the history of CORE, especially in the state of Kentucky. It attracted over 1,000 new members in Kentucky and was one of the first major civil rights victories. Although this was a big moment in Kentucky history, the NAACP had initiated direct action protests in Louisville even before CORE entered the state. This offered a base for the members of the CORE chapters in Kentucky to work off of and helped make strides in the movements of CORE.

==== Movements Made in Kentucky ====
CORE provided more interracial cooperation than other organizations, especially in the Lexington chapter, which consisted of mostly teachers and clergymen from the University of Kentucky. Their inaugural sit-in on July 11, 1959, at the Varsity Village Restaurant near the University of Kentucky campus, attended by both black and white members, set a precedent for peaceful protest. Despite their nonviolent approach, resistance from store managers often resulted in violence. This led to training sessions that were in place to prepare demonstrators for physical and verbal abuse, which many of the members encountered at these early sit-ins. They used new strategies, such as the “integrated sandwich plan”, where African Americans would sit next to a white member and the white member would order them a sandwich. These acts were only available to them as they were a group that encouraged interracial cooperation. Overall, CORE's presence and outlook on protests catalyzed momentum for civil rights advancement in Kentucky.

=== Harlem Chapter of CORE ===
At the same time in New York City, the Harlem chapter of CORE was very active in supporting African Americans in New York. The Harlem chapter joined forces with Columbia University's Student Non-Violent Coordinating Committee, Mau Mau, and other Harlem residents in order to protest different causes that stemmed from institutionalized racism. One of these causes was the opposition of Columbia University's perceived complacency in surrounding the Vietnam War. These groups also voiced their opinions that they were not in support of the university making plans for the building of a gym in Morningside Park, and brought awareness to the lack of student involvement in discipline at Columbia University. In addition to these efforts, the Harlem chapter of CORE gathered food and resources in Hamilton Hall, for the impoverished to use as needed.

=== March in Cicero, Illinois ===
On September 4, 1966, Robert Lucas and fellow members of CORE led activists through Cicero, Illinois, to pressure the city of Chicago's white leaders into making solid commitments to open housing. Shortly before the march, Chicago city officials, including Mayor Richard J. Daley, negotiated a Fair Housing agreement with Martin Luther King Jr., James Bevel, Al Raby and others in exchange for an end of demonstrations. Robert Lucas and other members of CORE felt that the march was strategically necessary and proceeded with it anyway. The march is documented in the 1966 short documentary film Cicero March, which was added to the National Film Registry in 2013.

=== Bay Area, California Chapters of CORE ===
CORE chapters in several Bay Area cities were instrumental in organizing civil rights protests throughout the area in the 1960s. Along with other local organizations, Bay Area CORE members targeted businesses that refused to change discriminatory hiring practices. Picketers demanded that businesses including Mel's Drive-in, Sheraton Palace, and Bank of America hire more minorities and provide opportunities for employment in higher level positions. Bay Area chapters also organized protests to show support and solidarity with civil rights organizers throughout the country. Organizers in the Bay Area targeted Crown Zellerbach(CZ)'s San Francisco headquarters to support CORE efforts in Bogalusa, Louisiana. Bogalusa was a CZ company town later known as "Klantown USA", where Civil Rights organizers protested layoffs and racist violence.

In 1967 the annual CORE convention was held in Oakland, California from June 30 to July 4. Inspired by the founding of the Black Panther Party and the growing Black Power movement, the convention was titled "Black Power: Blueprint for Survival."

=== Since 1966 ===
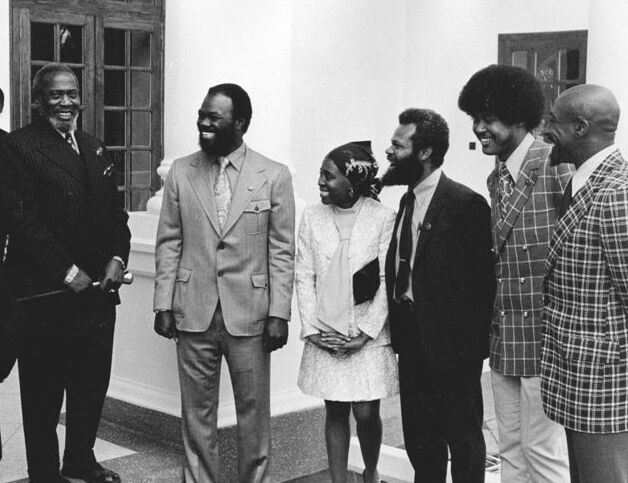
CORE President Roy Innis (2nd from left) and then wife Doris Funnye Innis (center) with a delegation from CORE is greeted by Kenyan President Jomo Kenyatta (left).

In 1966, James Farmer resigned as Director of CORE. He was replaced by Black Power advocate Floyd McKissick until 1968, when California activist Wilfred T. Ussery served a brief term as national chairman. He was replaced by Roy Innis, who was the National Chairman until his death in 2017. Innis initially led the organization to strongly support black nationalism. However, subsequent political developments within the organization led it to support conservative political positions.

The FBI's "COINTELPRO" program targeted civil rights groups, including the CORE, for infiltration, discreditation and disruption. In August 1967, the FBI instructed its program "COINTELPRO" to "neutralize" what the FBI called "black nationalist hate groups" and other dissident groups.

A CORE delegation toured seven African countries in 1971. Innis met with several heads of state, including Kenya’s Jomo Kenyatta, Tanzania’s Julius Nyerere, Liberia’s William Tolbert and Uganda's Idi Amin, all of whom were gifted a life membership to CORE. In 1973, Innis became the first American to attend the Organization of African Unity (OAU) as a delegate.

In 1981, to settle illegal fundraising allegations under Roy Innis, CORE paid a $35,000 fine.

CORE provides immigration services to immigrants in the preparation of petitions and applications to the United States Citizenship and Immigration Services. CORE also provides classes for immigrants in fields such as English and American Civics in its center in Nevada.

== Geography ==
Winning victories in Northern cities in the 1940s and 1950s, CORE became active in the South with the lunch counter sit-ins of 1960. The following year, CORE organized "Freedom Rides," sending black and white students South to disrupt segregated interstate bus service. Drawing much of its membership from college campuses, CORE kept up civil disobedience campaigns in the North as well as the South. They also organized activities in California, where they protested housing discrimination in San Francisco and Los Angeles, held a Western Region Conference in the Sacramento area, and launched an equal employment campaign at restaurants and stores throughout the state. In 1968, Seattle's chapter of CORE decided that, in order for it to function best in the community, it needed to be an all-black organization.

== International activities ==
CORE has an African branch based in Uganda, with Fiona Kobusingye as its director. Bringing attention to the malaria crisis is one of the organization's main activities. It has championed the use of DDT to fight the disease, and it has partnered with a variety of conservative and libertarian think tanks in this effort. In 2007, CORE organized a 300-mile walk across Uganda to promote DDT-based interventions against malaria.

== Criticism ==
According to an interview given by James Farmer in 1993, "CORE has no functioning chapters; it holds no conventions, no elections, no meetings, sets no policies, has no social programs and does no fund-raising. In my opinion, CORE is fraudulent."

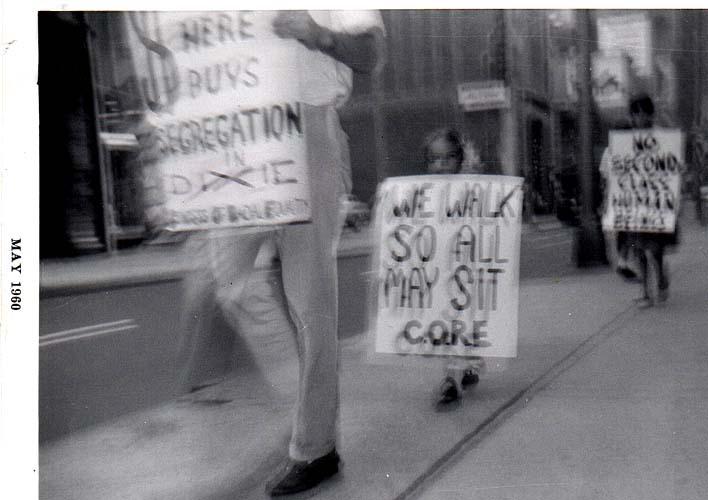
Picketing Woolworth's May 1960, Philadelphia

CORE has been criticized by environmentalist groups for its efforts promoting DDT use against malaria in Africa. A 2005 article in Mother Jones magazine accused the group of selling influence, writing that, "is better known among real civil rights groups for renting out its historic name to any corporation in need of a black front person. The group has taken money from the payday-lending industry, chemical giant (and original DDT manufacturer) Monsanto, and a reported $40,000 from ExxonMobil." In his book, Not A Conspiracy Theory: How Business Propaganda Hijacks Democracy, Donald Gutstein wrote that "In recent years CORE used its African-American facade to work with conservative groups to attack organizations like Greenpeace and undermine environmental regulation."

== See also ==
- Louisiana Diary, a 1964 documentary about CORE's 1963 voting registration drive in Louisiana.
- DePorres Club, an affiliate at Creighton University in Omaha
- New York Foundation
- Steelworkers and Shipyard Workers for Equality
