= Triveni Kala Sangam =

Art school in New Delhi, India

Coordinates: 28.627°N 77.232°E

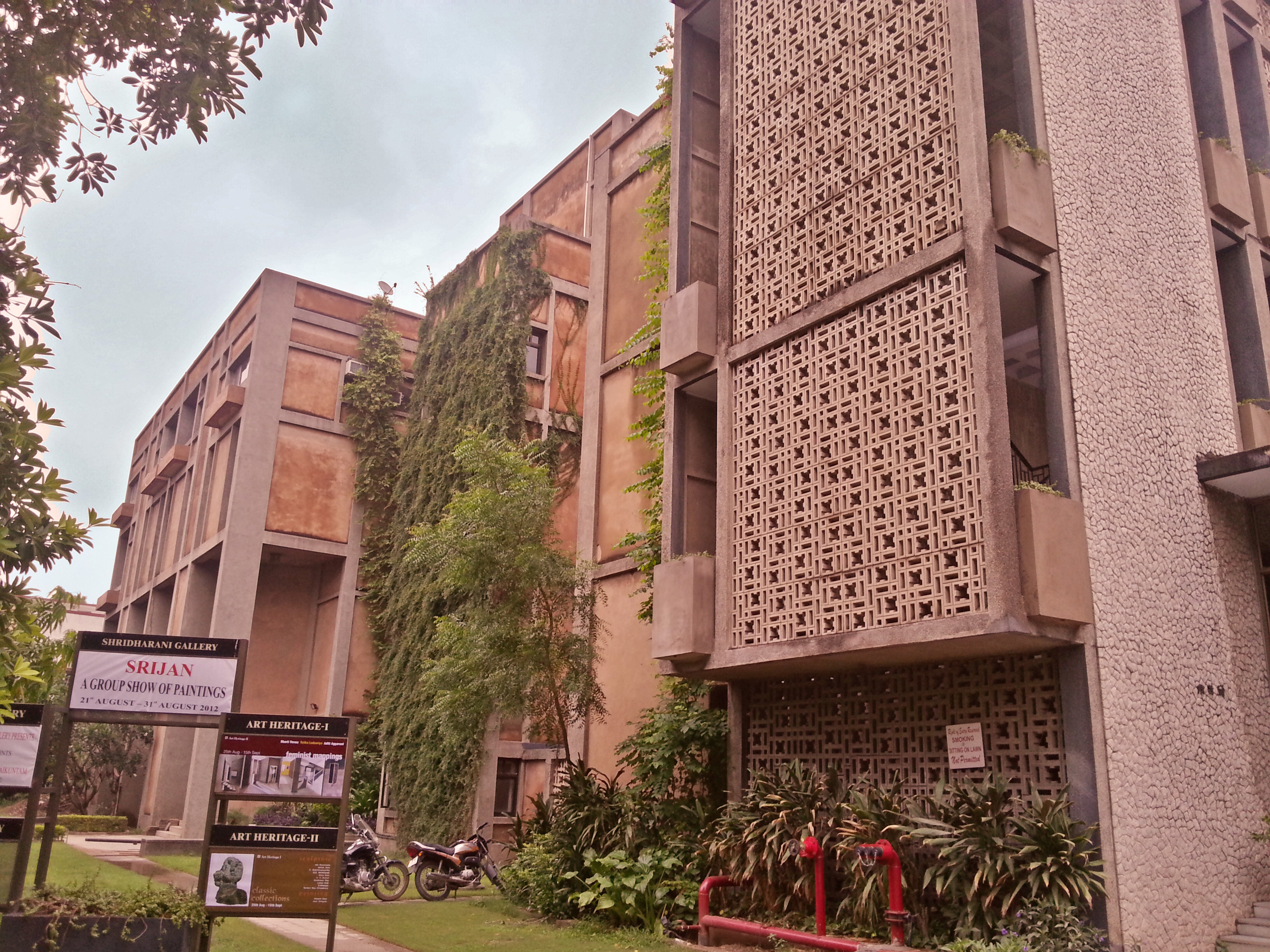
- Triveni Kala Sangam entrance with auditorium building
- Abbreviation: Triveni
- Formation: 1950
- Founder: Sundari K. Shridharani
- Purpose: Music, dance and arts education
- Headquarters: 205 Tansen Marg, near Bengali Market, New Delhi-110001

Triveni Kala Sangam is a cultural and arts complex and education centre in New Delhi. Founded in 1950, by Sundari K. Shridharani, who was also its founding director, Triveni, as it is commonly referred, contains four art galleries, a chamber theatre, outdoor theatre, open air sculpture gallery, besides this it runs its various arts, music and dance classes. It is situated on Tansen Marg, between Mandi House roundabout and Bengali Market.

== History ==
The idea of starting a dance institution in Delhi was raised by Sundari K. Shridharani, a former student of dancer Uday Shankar, in 1950 when she had just moved to Delhi after marriage. The name 'Triveni Kala Sangam' was coined by flautist, Vijay Raghav Rao and literally meaning "confluence of arts". It started in one room above a Coffee House in Connaught Place, Delhi, with two students under noted artist K. S. Kulkarni. Soon her efforts got noticed, and Pandit Nehru allotted her the land for the institution. Gradually, she organized a small group of people, started organizing concerts, and collecting funds. Guru Rajkumar Singhajit Singh joined Triveni in 1954, as Head of the Manipur Dance Section, and later in 1962, founded the 'Triveni Ballet' of which he was Director and Principal Dancer.

An American architect was commissioned to design to multi-purpose complex of art galleries, chamber theatre, library, photography darkroom, staff quarters, classrooms over just half an acre of land. Finally construction began around 1957 and eventually on 3 March 1963, the present building was inaugurated.

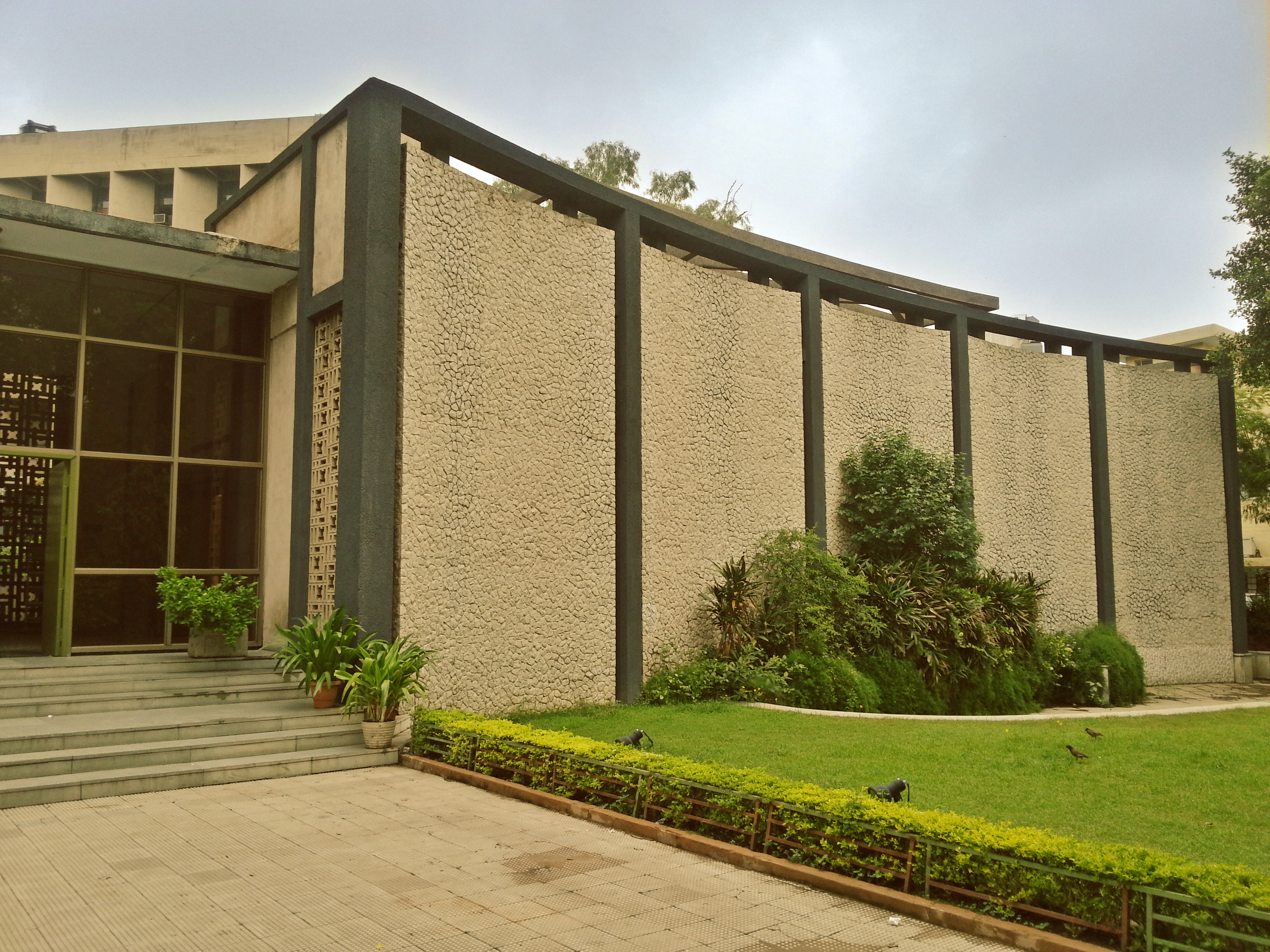
Main entrance and Shridharani Art Gallery facade on the left.

Triveni was one of the first buildings by noted American architect, Joseph Allen Stein (1957-1977) in India, who also designed several important building in New Delhi, like India International Centre and India Habitat Centre, Lodi Road. Designed in modern architecture style, the complex is noted for its " multiple spaces for multiple purposes" and use of jali work (stone lattices), which was to become Stein's hallmark.

Art Heritage Gallery was founded in 1977, by noted theatre personality, Roshen Alkazi, wife of theatre director Ebrahim Alkazi. It was a period before a host of commercial art galleries opened up across Delhi, and especially in South Delhi, even then Triveni managed to maintain its "non-commercial" approach to art. Roshan ran the gallery for over 40 years till her death in 2007. Today Ebrahim, although in his eighties, continues to be its director.

The Tea Terrace restaurant at Triveni Kala Sangam became a popular space for artists, student and intellectuals to meet and especially known for food specialities. It remained popular through the 70s and 80s, and even when other art centers started coming up across Delhi Over the years, Triveni has remained the only public institution with no membership or ticketed shows.

Sundari K. Shridharani, the Founder and Director of Triveni, was awarded the Padma Shri by Government of India in 1992. She was also praised for the degree of her support for the arts, and her help for those with disadvantaged backgrounds: lowering rates in the Triveni cafe to make it more affordable, allowing artistes to hold classes on the premise rent-free, and waiving fees for economically disadvantaged students. She died on 7 April 2012 in New Delhi, at the age of 93, and her son Amar Shridharani is the General Secretary of Triveni.

== Overview ==
Today the Triveni complex contains four art galleries, namely Shridharani Gallery, Art Heritage Gallery, Triveni Gallery and a basement gallery run by Art Heritage. While Shridharani is the largest gallery

The complex also houses Triveni Chamber Theatre, Triveni Garden Theatre (outdoor theatre), Triveni Sculpture Court - an open air sculpture gallery), students' hostels, Prakriti- a potted plant nursery, and a bookshop. Several classes in various dance and music forms, painting, and photography are offered at the Triveni complex.

== Arts and performing arts education ==
- Institute of Fine Arts "Abhi-nayaa"
  - Indian classical dances: Bharatnatyam, Manipuri, Odissi and Chhau.
  - Indian classical music: Hindustani Vocal, Sitar, Flute and Tabla.
  - Arts: Painting, drawing, Sculpture, Glass Art and photography. Photography course is of five-month duration and starts every 15 January and 15 July.
