= Ruth Turner Perot =

American civil rights activist

Ruth Turner Perot (née Turner) is an African American advocate for civil rights and healthcare. Perot was Executive Secretary of the Congress of Racial Equality (CORE). Perot is the Executive Director of the Summit Health Institute for Research and Education (SHIRE).

== Early life and education ==
Perot graduated from Oberlin College in 1960 with a Bachelor's of Arts degree in German. For a year after graduation, Perot attended the Free University of Berlin. During her time at Oberlin College, Perot spoke out against racial inequalities in Oberlin. In an interview with Oberlin Alumni, Perot said:

I felt there was an ivory tower quality to life at Oberlin where people were patting themselves on the back for being liberals, when I don't think they really understood what being a liberal meant. Being a liberal was a movement started by people who were disenfranchised and oppressed, so I was trying to testify for folks at Oberlin what it meant to be engaged in that struggle.

== Career ==
=== Civil rights advocacy ===
Perot was inspired to leave teaching and join the Congress of Racial Equality (CORE) full-time by the Birmingham campaign.

Perot served as the chairman of the Cleveland chapter of CORE from November 1962 to June 1963 while she worked as a German teacher in Cleveland public schools. While working as the executive secretary for CORE in Cleveland, Ohio, Perot worked to fight segregation and racial injustice. In 1964, she led sit ins with Johnathan Ealy to support desegregation in the Reed v. Rhodes case in Cleveland, Ohio. She was joined by other supporters, like Richard L. Gunn (UFM) during some demonstrations. That same year, Perot and other CORE activists protested at a construction site for a segregated school, resulting in one injury.

Perot was labeled "The first lady of Black Power" for her work with the Congress of Racial Equality. She was credited as one of the first woman leaders of the national Black Power movement, preceding Kathleen Cleaver and Elaine Brown, and with helping get Floyd McKissick elected into office as the National Director of CORE.

She was interviewed by Robert Penn Warren for the book Who Speaks for the Negro? alongside other activists including Stokely Carmichael and Jean Wheeler.

=== Healthcare advocacy ===
Since leaving CORE, Perot has shifted to public health administration advocacy work, specifically for communities of color and under-served populations in healthcare. In 2001, she co-founded Out of Many, One, a national, multicultural advocacy coalition to support health parity in communities of color. She published an action plan based on the work of Out of Many, One in 2006.

Perot served in the National Health IT Collaborative for the Underserved from 2008 to 2013 to help under-served communities to benefit from healthcare initiatives. Her work on healthcare information technology extended to the Health Policy Forum, where she wrote two articles in 2009 and 2011. Perot received the "Healthcare Hero" award from the Congressional Black Caucus Health Braintrust.

Perot works as the Executive Director for the Summit Health Institute for Research and Education, Inc. (SHIRE) in the Washington, D.C. area. She has worked with SHIRE to combat healthcare disparities including childhood obesity, wellness, and protecting the uninsured according to the Affordable Care Act.

== Personal life ==
While working for CORE, Perot met her future husband, Antoine Perot Jr. After their marriage, Perot and her husband both worked as activists with the Harambee movement in Cleveland, Ohio.
