= Agreement on the Privileges and Immunities of the International Criminal Court =

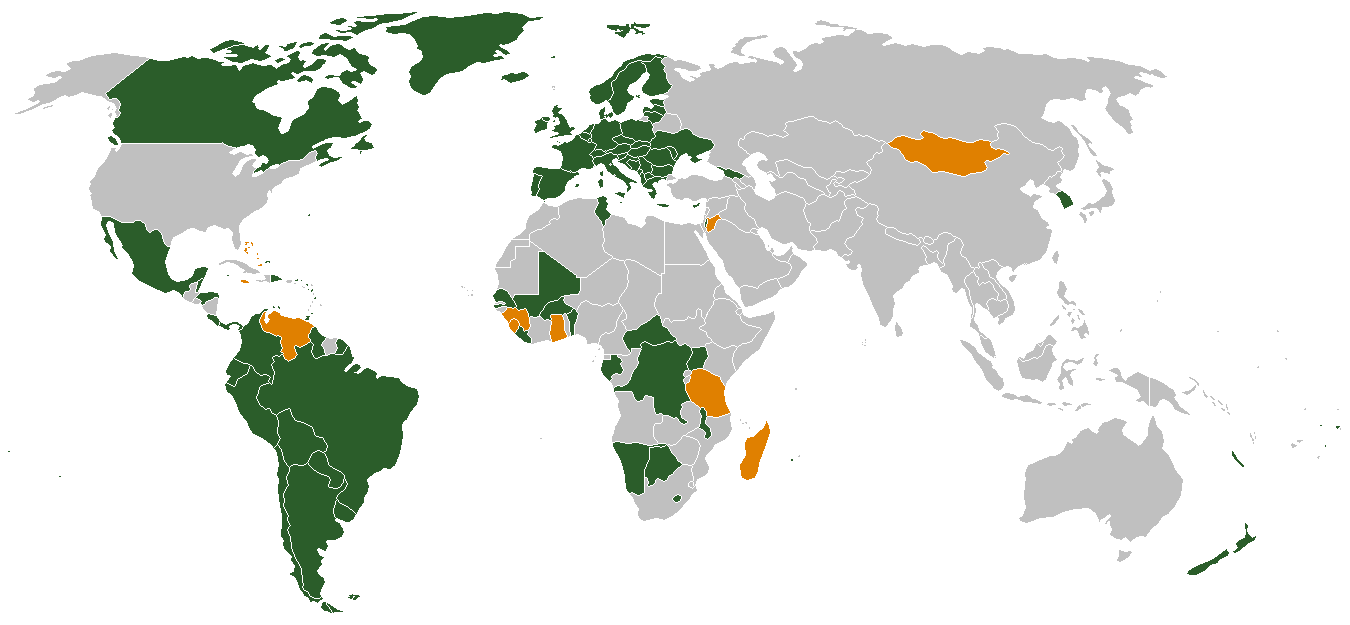
Dark green: States parties to the Agreement Light green: States that have ratified but for which the Agreement is not yet in force Orange: Signatories that have not ratified

The Agreement on the Privileges and Immunities of the International Criminal Court is a treaty that was adopted by the Assembly of States Parties to the International Criminal Court on 9 September 2002. The treaty provides certain privileges and immunities to officials and staff of the International Criminal Court in order for them to perform their duties impartially. The treaty entered into force on 22 July 2004 after it was ratified by ten states.

== States parties ==
Currently there are 80 states parties to the Agreement.

State party	Signed	Ratified or acceded	Entry into force
Albania	—	2 August 2006	1 September 2006
Andorra	21 June 2004	11 February 2005	13 March 2005
Argentina	7 October 2002	1 February 2007	3 March 2007
Austria	10 September 2002	17 December 2003	22 July 2004
Belgium	11 September 2002	28 March 2005	27 April 2005
Belize	26 September 2003	14 September 2005	14 October 2005
Benin	10 September 2002	24 January 2006	23 February 2006
Bolivia	23 March 2004	20 January 2006	19 February 2006
Bosnia and Herzegovina	—	24 January 2012	23 February 2012
Botswana	—	13 November 2008	13 December 2008
Brazil	17 May 2004	12 December 2011	11 January 2012
Bulgaria	2 May 2003	28 July 2006	27 August 2006
Burkina Faso	7 May 2004	10 October 2005	9 November 2005
Canada	30 April 2004	22 June 2004	22 July 2004
Central African Republic	—	6 October 2006	5 November 2006
Chile	—	26 September 2011	26 October 2011
Colombia	18 December 2003	15 April 2009	15 May 2009
Congo, Democratic Republic of the	—	3 July 2007	2 August 2007
Costa Rica	16 December 2002	28 April 2011	28 May 2011
Croatia	23 September 2003	17 December 2004	16 January 2005
Cyprus	10 June 2003	18 August 2005	17 September 2005
Czech Republic	—	4 May 2011	3 June 2011
Denmark (Note: The Agreement does not apply to the Faroe Islands.)	13 September 2002	3 June 2005	3 July 2005
Dominican Republic	—	10 September 2009	10 October 2009
Ecuador	26 September 2002	19 April 2006	19 May 2006
Estonia	27 June 2003	13 September 2004	13 October 2004
Finland	10 September 2002	8 December 2004	7 January 2005
France	10 September 2002	17 February 2004	22 July 2004
Gabon	—	22 September 2010	22 October 2010
Georgia	—	10 March 2010	9 April 2010
Germany	14 July 2003	2 September 2004	2 October 2004
Greece	25 September 2003	6 July 2007	5 August 2007
Guyana	—	16 November 2005	16 December 2005
Honduras	—	1 April 2008	1 May 2008
Hungary	10 September 2002	22 March 2006	21 April 2006
Iceland	10 September 2002	1 December 2003	22 July 2004
Ireland	9 September 2003	20 November 2006	20 December 2006
Italy	9 September 2002	20 November 2006	20 December 2006
Korea, South	28 June 2004	18 October 2006	17 November 2006
Latvia	29 June 2004	23 December 2004	22 January 2005
Lesotho	—	16 September 2005	16 October 2005
Liberia	—	16 September 2005	16 October 2005
Liechtenstein	—	21 September 2004	21 October 2004
Lithuania	25 May 2004	30 December 2004	29 January 2005
Luxembourg	10 September 2002	20 January 2006	19 February 2006
Malawi	—	7 October 2009	6 November 2009
Mali	20 September 2002	8 July 2004	7 August 2004
Malta	—	21 September 2011	21 October 2011
Mexico	—	26 September 2007	26 October 2007
Moldova	—	17 May 2017	16 June 2017
Mongolia	4 February 2003	25 April 2022	May 25, 2022
Montenegro (Note: Montenegro acceded to the Agreement on 3 June 2006 (the date of its independence) per a declaration it sent to the Secretary-General of the United Nations, which was received on 23 October 2006.)	—	23 October 2006	3 June 2006
Namibia	10 September 2002	29 January 2004	22 July 2004
Netherlands	11 September 2003	24 July 2008	23 August 2008
New Zealand	22 October 2002	14 April 2004	22 July 2004
North Macedonia	—	19 October 2005	18 November 2005
Norway	10 September 2002	10 September 2002	22 July 2004
Panama	14 April 2003	16 August 2004	15 September 2004
Palestine	–	2 January 2015	1 February 2015
Paraguay	11 February 2004	19 July 2005	18 August 2005
Peru	10 September 2003	18 January 2017	17 February 2017
Poland	30 June 2004	10 February 2009	12 March 2009
Portugal	10 December 2002	3 October 2007	2 November 2007
Romania	30 June 2004	17 November 2005	17 December 2005
Samoa	—	8 April 2016	8 May 2016
San Marino	—	12 March 2020	11 April 2020
Senegal	19 September 2002	25 September 2014	25 October 2014
Serbia	18 July 2003	7 May 2004	22 July 2004
Slovakia	19 December 2003	26 May 2004	22 July 2004
Slovenia	25 September 2003	23 September 2004	23 October 2004
Spain	21 April 2003	24 September 2009	24 October 2009
Sweden	19 February 2004	13 January 2005	12 February 2005
Switzerland	10 September 2002	25 September 2012	25 October 2012
Timor-Leste	—	30 May 2025	29 June 2025
Trinidad and Tobago	10 September 2002	6 February 2003	22 July 2004
Tunisia	—	29 June 2011	29 July 2011
Uganda	7 April 2004	21 January 2009	20 February 2009
Ukraine	—	29 January 2007	28 February 2007
United Kingdom (Note: The Agreement entered into force for Akrotiri and Dhekelia; Anguilla; Bermuda; the British Virgin Islands; the Cayman Islands; the Falkland Islands; Montserrat; the Pitcairn Islands; Saint Helena, Ascension and Tristan da Cunha; and the Turks and Caicos Islands on 11 March 2010. For the Isle of Man it entered into force on 13 March 2013 and for Gibraltar it entered into force on 20 April 2015.)	10 September 2002	25 January 2008	24 February 2008
Uruguay	30 January 2004	3 November 2006	3 December 2006

== Withdrawal ==
Article 37 of the Agreement allows for states to withdraw from the Agreement by "denunciation". Withdrawal takes effect one year after notification of the depositary. As of May 2026, one have given formal notice of its intention to withdraw from the Agreement, but subsequently rescinded its withdrawal.

State party	Signed	Ratified or acceded	Entry into force	Withdrawal notified	Withdrawal effective	Withdrawal rescinded
Hungary	15 January 1999	30 November 2001	1 July 2002	2 June 2025	—	29 May 2026

== Signatories which have not ratified ==
A total of nine states have signed but not ratified the Agreement.

State	Signed
Bahamas, The (Note: The Bahamas and Jamaica have signed but not yet ratified the Rome Statute.)	30 June 2004
Ghana	12 September 2003
Guinea	1 April 2004
Jamaica	30 June 2004
Jordan	28 June 2004
Madagascar	12 September 2002
Sierra Leone	26 September 2003
Tanzania	27 January 2004
Venezuela	16 July 2003
