= Africa Action =

U.S. nonprofit organization

- Predecessor: Africa Fund; Africa Policy Information Center; American Committee on Africa
- Headquarters: Washington, D.C.
- Website: www.actionafrica.org

Africa Action is a nonprofit organization that is based in Washington, D.C., working to change U.S.–Africa relations to promote political, economic and social justice in nations of Africa. They provide accessible information and analysis, and mobilize popular support for campaigns to achieve this mission.

== Predecessor organizations ==
Africa Action is the name the organization adopted in 2001, after three organizations, the American Committee on Africa, the Africa Fund, and the Africa Policy Information Center, merged.

The American Committee on Africa (ACOA) was founded in New York City in 1953 by George Houser and other activists. It was created by a group of black and white civil rights activists led by Bayard Rustin under name Committee to Support South African Resistance, who had organized support for the historic Defiance Campaign in South Africa the previous year. In the book, No Easy Victories, ACOA is described as the “premier U.S. Africa solidarity organization”. It became this way through “coalition building… work with the young United Nations and by cultivating good relationships with emerging African leaders.” New York was a center of activity for ACOA through the 1980s in organizing anti-apartheid activities.

The Africa Fund, founded in 1966, worked with ACOA to provide key support for independence movements throughout Africa. During the anti-apartheid movement, the Africa Fund became the "principal contact point for progressive trade unionists and politicians." They encouraged US firms and stockholders to divest in South Africa and published updated lists of U.S. companies involved there.

The Africa Policy Information Center (APIC) was founded in Washington, DC in 1978. It produced research, analysis and education materials designed to widen the debate in the United States around African issues and the U.S. role in Africa.

== Current programs ==
According to their website, Africa Action is a national organization for political, economic and social justice in Africa. Africa Action contends that the U.S. has a special historic responsibility toward Africa. It also believes that racism has been and is a major determinant of U.S. policies toward Africa, Africans and U.S. citizens of African descent. Members of the organization value Africa and its peoples, and seek to work in partnership with Africans. Today, together with activists and civil society organizations throughout the United States and in Africa, Africa Action works to change U.S. foreign policy and the policies of international institutions to support African struggles for peace and development.

=== Peace and Justice in Darfur and all Sudan ===
In 2008 Africa Action launched a new, intensified campaign to raise awareness about the continuing crisis in Darfur and put public pressure on the next U.S. president to lead the international community in bringing peace and justice to Darfur and all Sudan. In June 2008, both Barack Obama and John McCain signed a pledge promising "unstinting resolve" to end genocide in Darfur. Today Africa Action is mobilizing public pressure to keep this promise by achieving:

1. Protection of civilians from violence, starvation and disease;
2. Sustainable peace for all Sudan, including upholding the Comprehensive Peace Agreement; and
3. Justice for victims and accountability for perpetrators.

As part of this campaign Africa Action is working with other organizations to collect one million postcards urging President Obama to make peace and justice in Darfur and all Sudan a Day-One priority.

=== Campaign to End HIV/AIDS in Africa ===
Africa Action’s Campaign to End HIV/AIDS in Africa mobilizes U.S. activists to change the policies of their own government to help end the HIV/AIDS crisis in Africa. According to Africa Action, the HIV/AIDS pandemic is the greatest global threat in the world today. Africa is ground zero of the crisis – home to nearly two-thirds of those living with HIV/AIDS worldwide. Africa’s HIV/AIDS crisis is the direct result of centuries of global injustice. Now, African efforts to defeat HIV/AIDS are hindered by insufficient resources and by U.S. and international policies that restrict access to essential treatment and comprehensive health care.

=== Campaign to Cancel Africa's Debt ===
Africa Action’s Campaign to Cancel Africa’s Debt mobilizes pressure on the U.S. government to push for 100% debt cancellation for all impoverished African countries without harmful conditions. According to Africa Action, Africa's over $200 billion debt burden is the single biggest obstacle to the continent's development. Most of this debt is illegitimate, having been incurred by despotic and unrepresentative regimes. African countries spend almost $14 billion annually on debt service, diverting resources from HIV/AIDS programs, education and other important needs. The U.S. and other rich countries have resisted calls to cancel this debt, instead proposing partial solutions that are inadequate and impose harsh economic policies on indebted countries.

== Key countries ==
Africa Action believes that it is in the U.S.’ interest that, within each African region, countries and peoples should be able to advance the common goals of achieving security, democracy and development. While the paths to these objectives may differ, they are inseparable. Economic progress cannot be isolated from the needs for security and expansion of democratic rights.

Rational strategies to pursue these goals cannot be designed purely in terms of bilateral relations with selected countries. At the same time, it is not feasible to give equal weight to U.S. relations with each African country.

Africa Action singles out five African nations as "focus countries" where the U.S. must be consistently involved: South Africa, Nigeria, Democratic Republic of the Congo, Kenya, Algeria.

Each "focus country" meets most or all of the following criteria: (1) they are large countries with large populations (usually the largest in the sub-region); (2) they boast the strongest and most industrialized economies in their respective regions; (3) they are presently among the largest trading partners for the U.S. in Africa (and the largest in their sub-region); (4) the U.S. has diverse and longstanding interests in them (economic, political, social and security); and (5) they are potential economic and political powerhouses of their respective regions.

These countries are all key actors within their respective regions, whose cooperation will be invaluable to resolving a wide range of problems. They are likely to be either forces for regional security or sources of regional instability. Finally, there are domestic constituencies in the U.S. concerned with policy toward each of these countries that can help build and sustain public support for new U.S. initiatives.

Giving priority to these countries should not be confused with making unconditional alliances with their ruling elites, with seeking to build them up as regional hegemonic powers, or with granting them automatic first-call with regard to economic assistance. Rather, U.S. policy towards each of these key countries must encompass the realities of each region they are a part of, and encourage constructive dialogue and collective problem solving among neighbors.

Americans must also recognize that the U.S. has special historical responsibilities toward a select number of other countries—Liberia, Angola, Somalia, and Sudan—that warrant particular attention. The policy approaches to these countries will also be most effective if integrated into policies toward their respective regions.

Sustained attention to "focus countries" should always be placed within the respective regional context. Thus, there should be a Southern Africa policy while acknowledging that South Africa is a priority within the region, and a West African policy that recognizes Nigeria's centrality to U.S. concerns in that region. What happens in the DRC, will have profound effects on the prospects for its neighbors. Although their regional weight is less overwhelming, Kenya and Algeria will also have major impacts on their respective regions.
