= Journey of Reconciliation =

1947 anti-segregation nonviolent protest in the southern United States

- Part of the Civil Rights Movement
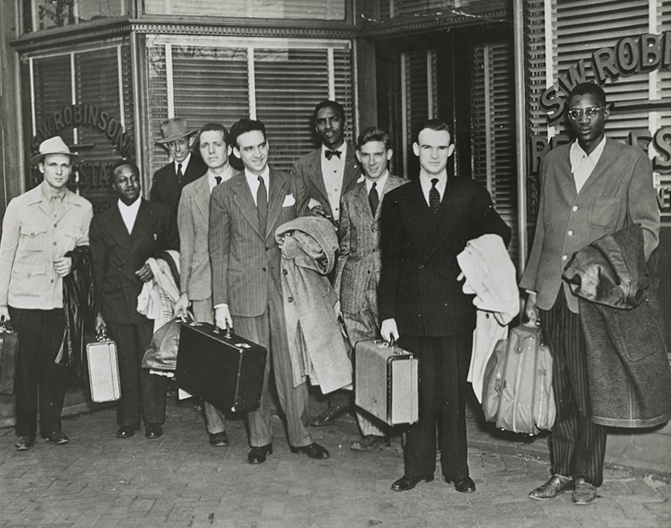
- Date: April 9 – 23, 1947
- Location: Durham, North Carolina, Chapel Hill, North Carolina
- Result: Inconclusive

Parties
Congress of Racial Equality (CORE); American Friends Service Committee (AFSC); Fellowship of Reconciliation (FOR)	State police

Lead figures
George Houser; James Peck; Bayard Rustin; Dennis Banks; Andrew Johnson; Conrad Lynn; Wallace Nelson; Eugene Stanley; William Worthy; Nathan Wright; Louis Adams; Ernest Bromley; Joe Felmet; Homer Jack; Worth Randle; Igal Roodenko; Frances Bergman Genevieve Hughes Walter Bergman Mae Frances Moultrie	

Casualties and losses
Deaths: Injuries:1; Arrests: 16	Deaths: Injuries:1

The Journey of Reconciliation, also called "First Freedom Ride", was a form of nonviolent direct action to challenge state segregation laws on interstate buses in the Southern United States. Bayard Rustin and 18 other men and women were the early organizers of the two-week journey that began on April 9, 1947. The participants started their journey in Washington, D.C., traveled as far south as North Carolina, before returning to Washington, D.C.

The journey was seen as inspiring the later Freedom Rides of the Civil Rights Movement from May 1961 onward. James Peck, one of the white participants, also took part in the Freedom Ride of May 1961.

== History ==
Sixteen men from the Congress of Racial Equality (CORE) took part, eight white and eight black, including the organizers, white Methodist minister George Houser of the Fellowship of Reconciliation (FOR) and CORE and black Quaker Bayard Rustin of FOR and the American Friends Service Committee. The other black participants were Chicago musician Dennis Banks; Andrew Johnson, a student from Cincinnati; New York attorney Conrad Lynn; Wallace Nelson, a freelance lecturer; Eugene Stanley of North Carolina A&T College; William Worthy of the New York Council for a Permanent FEPC; and Nathan Wright, a church social worker from Cincinnati. The other white participants were North Carolina ministers Louis Adams and Ernest Bromley; Joe Felmet of the Southern Workers Defense League; Homer Jack, executive secretary of the Chicago Council Against Racial and Religious Discrimination; James Peck, editor of the Workers Defense League News Bulletin; Worth Randle, a Cincinnati biologist; and radical pacifist Igal Roodenko.

The participants planned to visit fifteen cities in Virginia, North Carolina, Tennessee, and Kentucky. Starting in Washington D.C., they went through Richmond and stopped in Petersburg. The following day, after passing through Raleigh and arriving in Durham, the bus driver reported Rustin for refusing to move to the back of the vehicle. The police did nothing, and all that happened was the bus was delayed for 45 minutes while the bus driver and Rustin refused to both move. During the two-week trip, African Americans continued to sit in front, white Americans sat in back, or sometimes side-by-side, all in violation of current state laws which required passengers to practice segregated seating in buses. The day after the bus driver called the police on Rustin, the group of eight white men and eight black men met with Intercollegiate Council for Religion in Life, and attended church services. April 13, four of the men were arrested, two black men for not giving up their seat, and two white men for defending the two black men. James Peck went to pay their bonds, and was hit by a taxi driver in the head. Racial tension began to grow as the journey went on. Martin Watkins, a veteran, was beaten by a group of taxi drivers for speaking to an African American woman at a bus stop.

In May 1947, the two black men and two white men who had been arrested earlier in the bus ride faced charges afterwards and did not win appealing their sentences. On March 21, 1949, Rustin, Felmet, and Rodenko lost at the courthouse in Hillsborough and were sent to segregated chain gangs.

"Shortly thereafter, the men arrested were reunited in Greensboro with the remaining "freedom riders." Racial tensions only heightened in the aftermath of the riders’ exodus. On April 14, Martin Watkins, a white, disabled war veteran and UNC student, was beaten by several taxi drivers for speaking with an African American woman at a bus stop. Watkins pressed charges, but the judge also brought charges against Watkins arguing that he started the fight. Debates raged for nearly a week in both the Daily Tar Heel and Chapel Hill Weekly over the incident and race relations. The "Journey of Reconciliation" continued on, eventually passing back through western North Carolina, Tennessee, Kentucky, and then returning to Virginia and Washington, D.C.

In May 1947 those members who had been arrested went on trial and were sentenced. The riders unsuccessfully appealed their sentences. On March 21, 1949, Rustin and two white protesters surrendered at the courthouse in Hillsborough and were sent to segregated chain gangs. Rustin published journal entries about the experience. His writings, as well as the actions of the "Journey" riders in April 1947, in time inspired Rosa Parks’ nonviolent protest in 1955 and the Freedom Rides of 1960–1961."

They were supported by the recent 1946 U.S. Supreme Court ruling in Irene Morgan v. Commonwealth of Virginia, which prohibited segregation in interstate travel as unconstitutional, by putting "an undue burden on commerce." The Southern states were refusing to enforce the Court's decision. Based on consultation, the protesters limited their direct action to the Upper South, where the risk of violence was not as high as in the Deep South.

The riders suffered several arrests, notably in North Carolina. Judge Henry Whitfield expressed his distaste for the white men involved:

"It's about time you Jews from New York learned that you can't come down here bringing your niggers with you to upset the customs of the South. Just to teach you a lesson, I gave your black boys thirty days [on a chain gang], and I give you ninety."

The NAACP and Thurgood Marshall had reservations about the use of direct action, expecting to provoke much violence with little progress toward civil rights. The NAACP did offer a limited amount of legal help for those arrested. Bayard Rustin believed that the Journey of Reconciliation, as well as other actions challenging segregation in these years, contributed to the eventual ruling of the US Supreme Court in 1954 in Brown v. Board of Education. It ruled that segregated schools were unconstitutional and ordered them ended.

== See also ==
- Sarah Keys v. Carolina Coach Company (1953)
- Boynton v. Virginia (1960)

== Bibliography ==
- Raymond Arsenault (2006). Freedom Riders:1961 and the Struggle for Racial Justice: Pivotal Moments in American History. Oxford University Press. ISBN 9780199755813.
- Derek Charles Catsam (2009) Freedom's Main Line: The Journey of Reconciliation and the Freedom Rides. University Press of Kentucky. ISBN 978-0-8131-3377-5
