= American Political Items Collectors =

- Founded: 1945
- Type: Collectors Society
- Location: Delaware, Ohio
- Region served: United States
- Products: The Keynoter
- Members: 1,500
- Website: apic.us

The American Political Items Collectors is a 501(c)3 non profit organization founded in 1945 to encourage the study, collecting, and preservation of political campaign memorabilia. It is the largest organization of political memorabilia collectors in the United States. The group actively seeks to educate the general public about government and political history through displays at libraries and museums, as well as educating the public about reproduction items.

== History ==
The American Political Items Collectors was started by a group of like minded collectors in 1945. This group recognized that there should be a place for Numismatics, art collectors, and other hobbyists that sought politically themed items. Membership interests cut across every medium conceivable from buttons and posters to clothing and online media. Collectors may consider themselves generalists, collecting every medium of item and from every timeframe back to George Washington inaugural buttons. Others might specialize by medium (posters only, for instance) or by collecting a specific candidate or field of candidates (collecting early career items - think William McKinley for Governor; collecting only Franklin Roosevelt, Teddy Roosevelt, Kennedy, or some other candidate; collecting local candidates for governor or U.S. Senator from one or more states).

== Membership ==
Any individual may join the organization by paying annual membership dues. Individuals who join can further connect with fellow collectors into various subgroups within the organization. These subgroups are called chapters, and are either "specialty chapters", that focus on a particular political figure like an American president, political candidate, political party or interest group. The other type of chapters are geographic chapters. Members of these chapters live in the same state or region and can either collect political items related to their region or not. Membership is also not limited to United States citizens. While the focus of the organization is primarily American, international membership is encouraged along with the study and preservation of non American political memorabilia.

Museums and Libraries are eligible for the Museum Partnership Program.

Members have the opportunity to attend regional shows hosted by local chapters. There are many of these shows held throughout the country each year.

== Publications ==
The American Political Items Collectors publishes a magazine entitled The Keynoter four times a year. Current issues are available to dues paying members. An archive of back issues is digitized and held within the organization's collection at the University of Maryland.

An independent monthly newsprint publication called The Bandwagon contains a monthly newsletter and is sent to all members via The Political Bandwagon.

== Political activism ==
The American Political Items Collectors advocated for federal legislation against the dearth of reproduction buttons, which resulted in The Hobby Protection Act of 1973. The Act requires that reproduction or fantasy political items be readily identified as such.

== National conventions ==
Every two years the American Political Items Collectors holds a national convention for collectors and the general public to gather. The conventions are a chance for their board of directors to meet and discuss organizational business, hold seminars for collectors and the general public, exhibit member collections, tour historical sites, attend social gatherings, attend an auction, buy, sell, and trade items with other collectors. The 2020 National Convention in Nashville, TN was delayed a year due to the COVID-19 virus. The American Political Items Collectors decided in 2021 to hold back-to-back nationals in order to maintain the even-year schedule so the 2022 National Convention will be held in Reno, Nevada.

=== Convention locations ===
Date	Location
2022	Reno, Nevada
2021	Nashville, Tennessee
2018	Springfield, Illinois
July 6–10, 2016	Hilton Hotel, Harrisburg, Pennsylvania
July 27-August 3, 2014	Denver, Colorado
July 30-August 5, 2012	Crowne Plaza North Hotel, Columbus, Ohio
August 1–8, 2010	Buffalo, New York
August 5–7, 2008	Las Vegas, Nevada
July 2006	Kansas City, Missouri
July 30-August 3, 2003	Orlando, Florida
August 7–10, 2002	Irvine, California
July 30-August 2, 2001	Louisville, Kentucky
August 4–7, 1999	Atlanta, Georgia
August 5–7, 1997	Monte Carlo Resort and Casino, Las Vegas, Nevada
August 3–5, 1995	St. Louis, Missouri
1993	East Brunswick, New Jersey
August 8–11, 1991	Anaheim, California
1989	Milwaukee, Wisconsin
