= Krishnalal Shridharani =

Indian writer

- Born: 16 September 1911; Umrala, Bombay Presidency, India
- Died: 23 July 1960 (aged 48); Delhi, India
- Education: PhD
- Occupations: Poet, playwright, journalist
- Spouse: Sundari K. Shridharani
- Writing career
- Language: Gujarati
- Notable work: War Without Violence (1939)
- Notable awards: Ranjitram Suvarna Chandrak (1958)

Krishnalal Shridharani (16 September 1911 – 23 July 1960) was an Indian poet, playwright and journalist. He studied sociology, economics and journalism at various institutions in India and the US. He participated in the Indian independence movement and was imprisoned, during which time he started writing plays and poetry. He also wrote many non-fiction books in English.

== Life ==
Shridharani was born in Umrala near Bhavnagar on 16 September 1911. He spent his childhood in Junagadh. He completed his primary education in Umrala and secondary education from Dakshinamurti Vinay Mandir, Bhavnagar. He joined Gujarat Vidyapith in 1929 and participated as a young man in the Dandi March of 1930. He was arrested near Karadi when he was going for Dharasana Satyagraha. He spent some time in Sabarmati and Nasik jails. He joined Shantiniketan (Visva-Bharati University) in 1931 and completed his graduation in 1933. In 1934, he went to US for further studies on the advice of James Pratt and Rabindranath Tagore, which made a lasting impression on his attitude. He completed Masters in Sociology and Economics from New York University in 1935. He completed MS in 1936 and PhD in 1940 from Columbia University Graduate School of Journalism.

He started writing for Amrita Bazar Patrika in 1945 and returned to India in 1946. He worked with the Ministry of External Affairs for some time. He married Sundari, a dancer and performing artist. He presided over the history and economics department of Gujarati Sahitya Parishad in 1946. He died following heart attack in Delhi on 23 July 1960.

His book War Without Violence (1939), which analyses Gandhian philosophy and tactics of nonviolence, influenced the members and strategies of the Congress of Racial Equality, and was widely circulated by African-American leaders during the U.S. civil rights movement. It was studied by Martin Luther King Jr. during the Montgomery bus boycott.

== Works ==
He wrote total sixteen plays. He wrote Vadlo (1931), a children's play, during his imprisonment during Dandi March. Peela Palash (1934), Piya Gori, Dusku, Dungali no Dado, Sonpari, Vijali, Vrushal, Mor na Inda are his other plays. Padmini is a historical play.

In 1934, his first poetry collection Kodiya was published, followed by Punarapi in 1961. Insan Mita Doonga is a short story based on his experiences with inmates during imprisonment.

His original works in English include My India, My America (1941) which is about his experiences during his life in the US. His book War without Violence had a great impact on the American civil rights movement. Others are Warning to the West (1943), The Big Four of India (1941), The Adventures of the Upside-Down Tree (1959), Story of The Indian Telegraph (1953), The Journalist in India (1956), Smiles From Kashmir (1959) and The Mahatma and the World (1946). He contributed in several journals and newspapers including The New York Times and Vogue.

== Awards ==
He was awarded the Ranjitram Suvarna Chandrak in 1958.

== See also ==
- List of Gujarati-language writers
