= Homer A. Jack =

American pacifist (1916–1993)

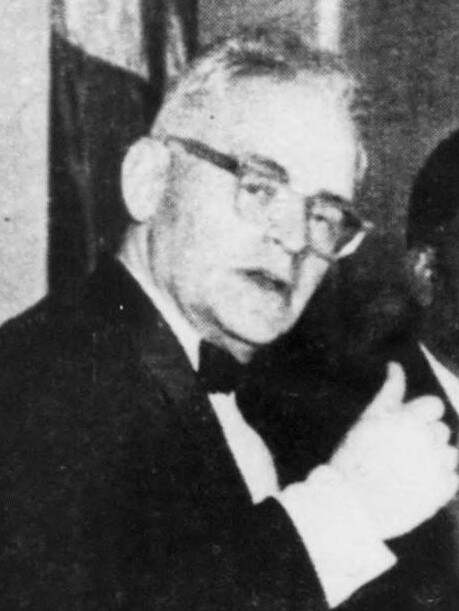
- Jack in 1959
- Born: May 19, 1916; Rochester, New York, U.S.
- Died: August 5, 1993 (aged 77); Swarthmore, Pennsylvania, U.S.
- Education: Meadville Theological School, Cornell University
- Occupations: political activist, Unitarian minister, committee chairmen
- Known for: social activism, helped found Congress of Racial Equality and National Committee for a Sane Nuclear Policy (SANE)
- Spouse(s): Esther Rhys Williams, Ingebord Belk

Homer A. Jack (May 19, 1916 – August 5, 1993) was an American Unitarian Universalist clergyman pacifist and social activist who helped found the Congress of Racial Equality and National Committee for a Sane Nuclear Policy (SANE).

== Early life and education ==
Jack was an only child to active socialist and freethinker parents. His grandparents had immigrated from central and eastern Europe to escape oppression and poverty. Like his parents, the child Jack was a radical nature-worshiper who distrusted organized religion. He met Esther Rhys Williams at Munroe High School, in the early 1930s, and the two married in 1939. The marriage would produce two children and end in divorce in the early 1970s.

Though in 1940 Jack received a Ph.D. in biology from Cornell University, he decided to enter the Unitarian ministry. In 1944, he graduated from Meadville Theological School in Chicago.

== Career ==
While in Chicago, Jack led efforts and rallies to prevent the United States' entry into World War II and fought racial segregation. He was active in the publication of Rochester's No-War News and the Fellowship of Reconciliation and helped organize the anti-war 1942 Chicago sit-in and the anti-segregation Journey of Reconciliation.

From 1942 to 1943, he served as a Unitarian minister in Lawrence, Kansas, where he spoke out against Lawrence's "violently anti-Negro and anti-labor" stance. He was the executive secretary of Chicago Council Against Racial and Religious Discrimination from 1943 to 1948, and from 1948 to 1959 served as the minister of the Unitarian Church of Evanston, Illinois.

Jack co-founded and was the associate director of the American Committee on Africa from 1959 to 1960, co-founded and served as executive director to the Congress of Racial Equality and National Committee for a Sane Nuclear Policy (SANE) from 1960 to 1964, and directed the Social Responsibility Department of the Unitarian Universalist Association in Boston from 1964 to 1970. In that role, Jack convened the "Emergency Conference on Unitarian Universalist Response to the Black Rebellion" as an effort toward Black Empowerment in the UUA. From 1970 to 1983, he was the secretary general of the World Conference of Religions for Peace in New York. Simultaneously, from 1973 to 1984, he chaired the NGO Committee on Disarmament, Peace and Security at the United Nations Headquarters.

In 1984, he served as a minister once again in Winnetka, Illinois, a position he would hold until 1989. That same year, he was awarded the Niwano Peace Prize.

== Later life ==
In the late 1980s, Jack retired from official positions and moved to Swarthmore, Pennsylvania, where he authored two books and continued to be active in various peace and human rights organizations. He was awarded the Jamnalal Bajaj Award in 1992. He also remarried, to German Quaker Ingeborg Belck. He died of cancer in Swarthmore in 1993. Jack's autobiography was published posthumously in 1996 as Homer's Odyssey: My Quest for Peace and Justice.

== Published works ==
- The Wit and Wisdom of Gandhi (editor) (1951)
- The Gandhi Reader: A Sourcebook of His Life and Writings (editor) (1956)
- Religion and Peace, Papers from the National Inter-Religious Conference on Peace (editor) (1956)
- Disarmament Workbook (1978)
- Disarm - or Die: The Second U.N. Special Session on Disarmament (1983)
- Mature Spirit: Religion Without Supernatural Hopes (co-authors Vincent Harding and Philip F. Mayer) (1987)
- World Conference on Religion and Peace (1993)
- Homer's Odyssey: My Quest for Peace and Justice (autobiography) (1996)
- Swarthmore College Peace Collection: Homer A. Jack Papers (1930–1995)
