= Georges Romme =

Dutch organizational theorist

Abel Georges Lodewijk Romme
- Born: February 29, 1960 (age 66); Nijmegen, Netherlands
- Occupations: Organizational theorist, academic and author

Academic background
- Education: Tilburg University (BSc, MSc); Maastricht University (PhD)

Academic work
- Institutions: Maastricht University; Tilburg University; Eindhoven University of Technology

Georges Romme (Dutch: Sjoerd) is a Dutch organizational theorist, academic and author. He is a full professor of Entrepreneurship & Innovation at the Eindhoven University of Technology.

Romme is known for introducing design science to organization and management studies. He has also pioneered the so-called thesis circle and is a thought leader on topics as professionalism and (organizational) hierarchy. He has authored and co-authored research articles and books, including The Quest for Professionalism: The Case of Management and Entrepreneurship, for which he received the EURAM Best Book Award and the Responsible Research in Management Award in 2017. He is also the recipient of the 2016 Tjalling C. Koopmans Asset Award from Tilburg University and the 2019 Distinguished Scholar-Practitioner Award from the Academy of Management.

== Education and career ==
Romme earned a BSc degree in Economics in 1981 and a MSc degree in 1984, both from Tilburg University. He worked as an assistant professor in Strategic Management at Maastricht University from 1989 to 1992 and obtained a doctoral degree from Maastricht University in 1992.

Romme continued his academic career at Maastricht University as an associate professor in Strategy & Organization from 1992 to 2000 and a senior research fellow in the Faculty of Economics and Business Administration (from 1996 to 2000). Subsequently, he was appointed as a professor of Management at Tilburg University. Since 2005, he has been a professor of Entrepreneurship & Innovation at the Eindhoven University of Technology.

Romme served as the Dean of the Industrial Engineering & Innovation Sciences (IE & IS) department of Eindhoven University of Technology from 2007 to 2014. Concurrently, he was the chairman of the Supervisory Board of Research School Beta from 2007 to 2014. He also was a member of various advisory boards, such as the Scientific Advisory Board of Aalto University's School of Science (2011-2020).

Romme also was a co-founder of the EIT InnoEnergy. He serves as the Ambassador for Entrepreneurship at the Eindhoven University of Technology and is also a fellow at the Center for Design Science in Entrepreneurship at the ESCP Business School, Berlin.

== Research ==
The scholarly work of Romme involves three main contributions: his work on the professionalization of the management discipline, design science methodology, and organizational hierarchy and circularity.

=== Quest for Professionalism ===
Romme has authored and co-authored several publications exploring the realm and purpose of business and management scholarship. In The Quest for Professionalism: The Case of Management and Entrepreneurship, which won the 2017 EURAM Best Book Award, he contended that the Quest for Professionalism is essential to mitigate the societal costs of managerial amateurism, by focusing on the development of a shared professional purpose and knowledge base, with an emphasis on the transformative role of management scholarship. Jan Spruijt wrote about this book that it "is a one-of-a-kind taking a much needed reflective approach to leadership and a critical note towards the level of professionalism that many of us are approaching the science of management and entrepreneurship with."

=== Design science ===
Romme's publications on design science have focused on developing and applying a research methodology that solves the rigor-relevance gap in organization and management research, inspired by Herbert Simon's The Sciences of the Artificial. Here, Romme advocated for the adoption of the design approach as a primary research mode (alongside the social sciences and humanities as prevailing modes) in the field of management, emphasizing the role of ideal targets, design principles, and (testing) practical solutions to address the persistent gap between theory and practice. With Dimo Dimov, Romme explored various ways to apply design science, distinguishing between developing a "theory of" empirical phenomena and a "theory for" generating them.

In many joint publications, Romme applied design science to develop and test solutions for major problems and challenges. Examples are design principles and various best practices for creating university spin-offs; a tool for mapping, analyzing and designing innovation ecosystems; a tool that facilitates value crafting; a practical approach to enhance citizen participation in a local democracy; a software tool for partner search in open innovation settings; design principles for sustainability assessment in business model innovation; a method for controlling the work of civil servants; and the blueprint of a deep-tech venture builder.

=== Organizational hierarchy and circularity ===
Romme analyzed organizational structure and hierarchy. In his early work in this area, he collaborated with Gerard Endenburg to codify Sociocracy as a novel organizational form based on the circular flow of power, which later also informed the development of Holacracy. In a study coauthored with Arjen van Witteloostuijn, Romme examined the role of triple loop learning in the emerging sociocratic (or circular) organization design, finding that this design facilitates single and double loop learning and acts as an infrastructure for triple loop learning, enabling well-informed choices about shared objectives and policies. In more recent work, Romme categorized the hierarchy phenomenon into four types—that is, hierarchy based on formal authority, achieved status, self-organized responsibility, and ideology—each involving a distinct social mechanism, thereby offering a typology for understanding hierarchy in complex social systems.

== Awards and honors ==
- 1996 – Wynand Wijnen Education Prize, Maastricht University
- 2014 – Honorary Medal, Eindhoven University of Technology
- 2016 – Tjalling C. Koopmans Asset Award, Tilburg University
- 2017 – Best Book Award, European Academy of Management
- 2017 – Responsible Research in Management Award, Responsible Research in Business and Management Network
- 2019 – Distinguished Scholar-Practitioner Award, Academy of Management
- 2025 - Gerard & Anton Hightech Sparkler Award

== Bibliography ==
=== Selected books ===
- Romme, Abel Georges Lodewijk (1992). A Self-organization Perspective on Strategy Formation. Datawyse. ISBN 978-90-90-04827-7.
- Romme, Georges (2016). The Quest for Professionalism. doi:10.1093/acprof:oso/9780198737735.001.0001. ISBN 978-0-19-873773-5.

=== Selected articles ===
- Romme, A. Georges L. (September 1995). "Self-organizing processes in top management teams: A boolean comparative approach". Journal of Business Research. 34 (1): 11–34. doi:10.1016/0148-2963(94)00032-A.
- Romme, A. Georges L. (May 1996). "A note on the hierarchy-team debate". Strategic Management Journal. 17 (5): 411–417. doi:10.1002/(SICI)1097-0266(199605)17:5<411::AID-SMJ809>3.0.CO;2-O.
- Romme, A. Georges L.; van Witteloostuijn, Arjen (October 1999). "Circular organizing and triple loop learning". Journal of Organizational Change Management. 12 (5): 439–454. doi:10.1108/09534819910289110.
- Romme, A. Georges L. (October 2003). "Making a Difference: Organization as Design". Organization Science. 14 (5): 558–573. doi:10.1287/orsc.14.5.558.16769.
- Romme, A. Georges L.; Endenburg, Gerard (April 2006). "Construction Principles and Design Rules in the Case of Circular Design". Organization Science. 17 (2): 287–297. doi:10.1287/orsc.1050.0169.
- Van Burg, Elco; Romme, A. Georges L.; Gilsing, Victor A.; Reymen, Isabelle M. M. J. (March 2008). "Creating University Spin-Offs: A Science-Based Design Perspective". Journal of Product Innovation Management. 25 (2): 114–128. doi:10.1111/j.1540-5885.2008.00291.x.
- van der Borgh, Michel; Cloodt, Myriam; Romme, A. Georges L. (March 2012). "Value creation by knowledge-based ecosystems: evidence from a field study". R&D Management. 42 (2): 150–169. doi:10.1111/j.1467-9310.2011.00673.x.
- Dimov, Dimo; Maula, Markku; Romme, A. Georges L. (September 2023). "Crafting and Assessing Design Science Research for Entrepreneurship" (PDF). Entrepreneurship Theory and Practice. 47 (5): 1543–1567. doi:10.1177/10422587221128271.
- Romme, A. Georges L.; Holmström, Jan (March 2023). "From theories to tools: Calling for research on technological innovation informed by design science". Technovation. 121 102692. doi:10.1016/j.technovation.2023.102692.
