= List of direct action groups =

The following is a partial list of direct action groups. Some groups known for their use of direct action include:

- ADAPT
- AIDS Coalition to Unleash Power (ACT UP)
- Anarchists Against the Wall
- Anarchist Black Cross (ABC)
- Animal Liberation Front
- Animal Liberation Press Office
- Anonymous
- Antifa (United States)
- A Quaker Action Group
- BAMN
- Camp for Climate Action
- Campus Antiwar Network
- Code Pink
- Committee of 100 (United Kingdom)
- Communist Party of India (Maoist)
- Confederación Nacional del Trabajo
- Connolly Youth Movement
- Cop Block
- Cymdeithas yr Iaith Gymraeg
- Cypherpunk
- Direct Action Committee
- Direct Action Everywhere
- Direct Action to Stop the War
- Earth First!
- Earth Liberation Front
- Euromaidan
- Extinction Rebellion
- Food Not Bombs
- GetEQUAL
- Green Mountain Anarchist Collective
- Greenpeace
- Homes Not Jails
- Industrial Workers of the World
- Landless Workers' Movement
- Lesbian Avengers
- Movement for a New Society
- MindFreedom International
- National Bolshevik Party
- National Mobilization Committee to End the War in Vietnam
- No Border network
- Occupy Wall Street
- Operation Save America
- PETA
- Plane Stupid
- Reclaim the Streets
- Rising Tide North America
- School of the Americas Watch (SOA Watch)
- School strike for climate
- Sea Shepherd Conservation Society
- Sons of Liberty
- Southern Christian Leadership Conference (SCLC)
- Squamish Five
- Students for a Democratic Society
- Take Back the Land
- Trident Ploughshares
- UkUncut
- Vetëvendosje! - Movement for Self-determination in Kosova
- War Resisters' International
- WOMBLES
- Yellow vests movement
- Zero Hour

== See also ==
- List of civil rights leaders
- Nonviolence
- Propaganda of the deed
- Rebellion
- Revolution
- Anarchism
