= Quaker business method =

Decision-making framework

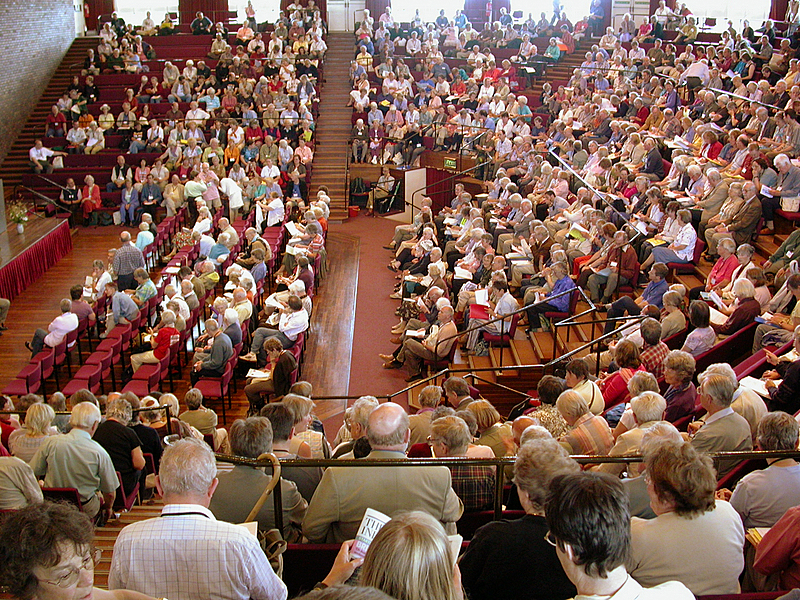
A Quaker business meeting in York, 2005

The Quaker business method or Quaker decision-making is a form of group decision-making and discernment, as well as of direct democracy, used by Quakers, or 'members of the Religious Society of Friends', to organise their religious affairs. It is primarily carried out in meetings for worship for business, which are regular gatherings where minutes are drafted, to record collective decisions. (Note: Meetings for worship for business are alternately known as meetings for worship with attention to business, meetings for worship with a concern for business and meetings for church affairs. The forms differ based on preference, not substantive differences in practice.)

The practice is based upon the core Quaker belief that there is "that of God in every one", and therefore every person has unmediated opportunity to experience the will of God. Subsequently, the practice aims to collectively discern the will of God through silent reflection, inspired statements (vocal ministry) and a capturing of the resultant "sense of the meeting". The strong spiritual basis marks the Quaker business method as a mystical form of decision-making, in contrast to purely rational practices such as parliamentary procedure. Quakers describe their practice as one of "unity", in comparison to majority, unanimity or consensus.

Although minor differences exist between how different Quaker organizations conduct their meetings for business, the practice has not fundamentally changed since its conception in the late 17th century, shortly after Quakerism began. The secular practices of consensus decision-making in activist movements and consent within Sociocracy were directly inspired by Quaker practice in the 20th century.

== History ==
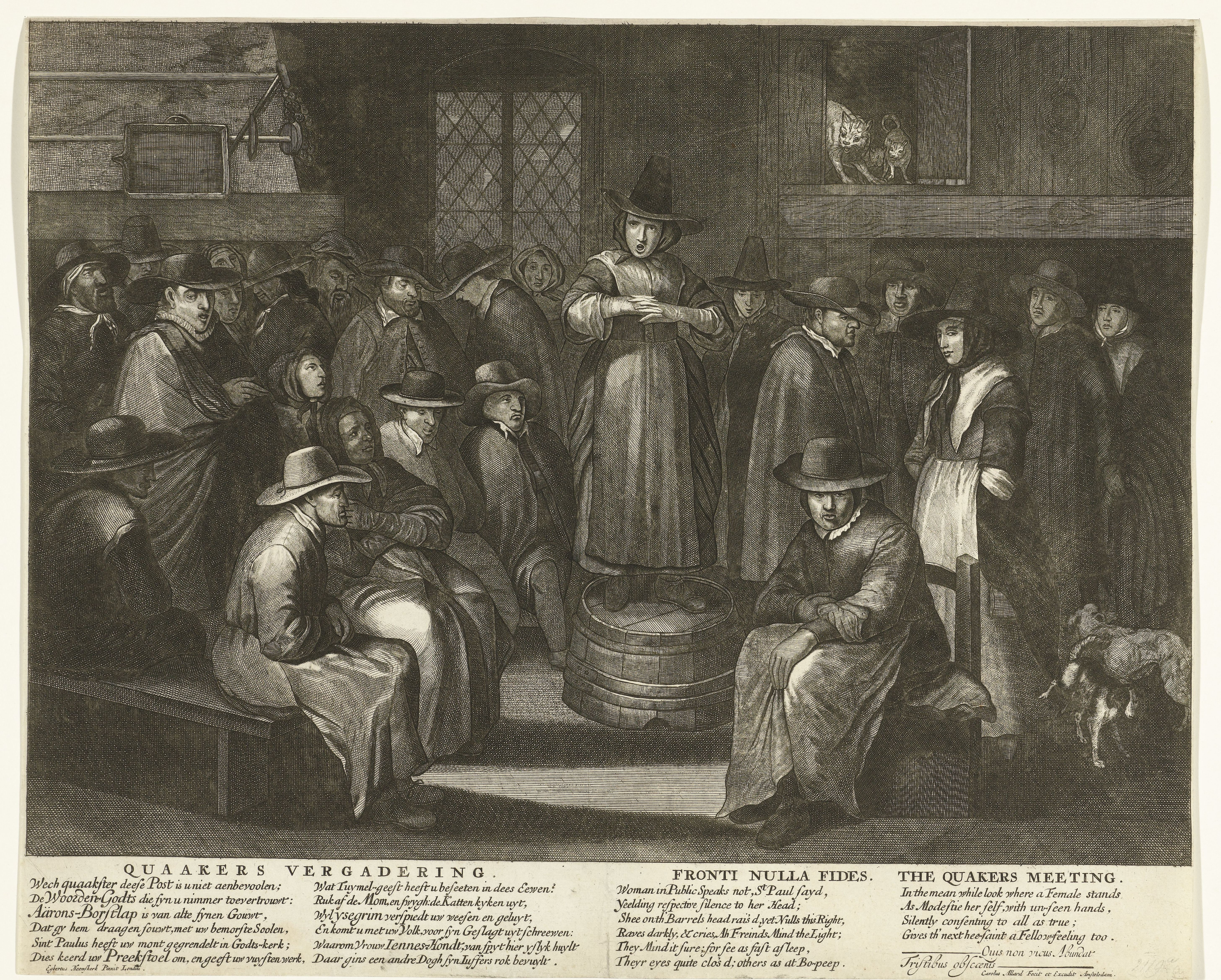
Satirical engraving of an English Quaker meeting around 1656

The Quakers were one of the many dissenting groups that separated from the Church of England during the English Civil War (1642–1651). Their belief that every person has an equal and direct opportunity to experience the will of God put them at odds with the hierarchy of the established church. Numerous early Quakers individually interpreted the will of God to require acts of civil disobedience, such as refusing to take oaths, going nude in public and refusing to take off their hats in the services of the Church of England. The growing resentment of the establishment towards the Quakers peaked when James Nayler re-enacted Christ entering Jerusalem in Bristol, 1656. He was charged with blasphemy, mutilated and imprisoned; repression against other Quaker disobedience increased.

George Fox and others concerned for the continuation of the Quakers came to the conclusion that although God is present in every person, and although God is without contradiction, the interpretation of God's will is influenced by the person interpreting. Thus he encouraged believers to meet together and collectively interpret the will of God, to corporately (i.e. as a unified body) "test" concerns and leadings. Such meetings were not to be 'rational discussions', but rather a collective investigation into God's will through the combination of personal experience.

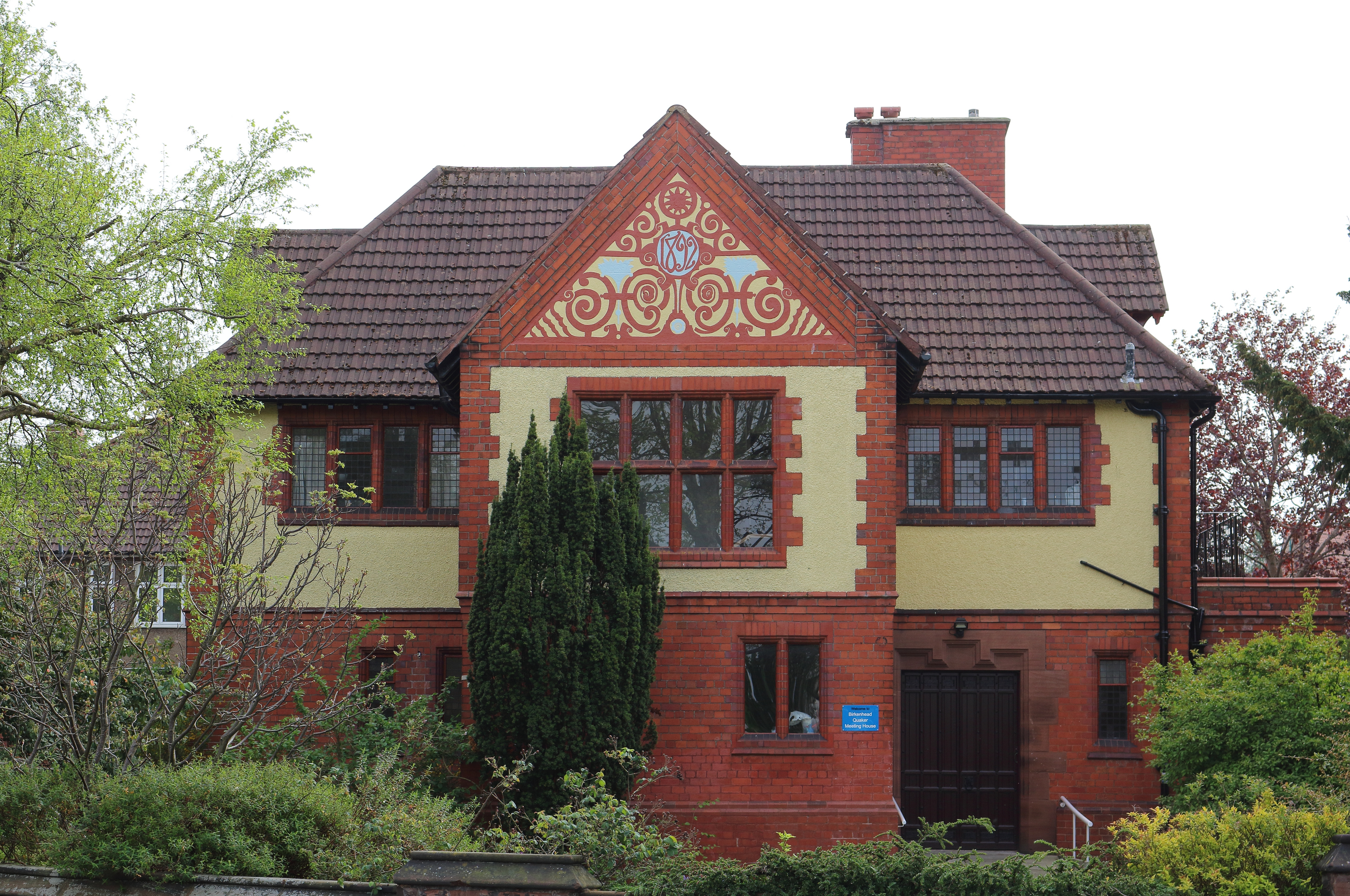
Claughton Quaker House

Originally, both men's and women's meetings for church affairs were held separately. This was a radical delegation of responsibility for the time. By the end of the 19th century, men's and women's meetings were fully integrated, with Meeting for Sufferings becoming integrated in 1896.

== Features ==
Although the practice differs in detail between different Quaker organizations, the main aspects remain the same. The most regular Quaker meeting, meeting for worship, does not use the practice. The practice is used in meetings where Quaker affairs are investigated and decided upon at all levels of hierarchy: local/preparative meetings, area/monthly meetings and yearly meetings. Local meetings are always subordinate to their area meeting, and in turn their yearly meeting. Meetings for church affairs are also considered to be meetings for worship, meaning "they carry the same expectation that God's guidance can be discerned if we are truly listening together and to each other".

Meetings for worship for business will usually be open to non-members, apart from confidential matters, such as discernment on membership. If someone is the topic of discernment, for example, they have been nominated for a role, they (and any immediate family members) will be asked to leave the room. This is to ensure everyone feels able to share without causing offense.

=== Clerk(s) and their duties ===
A necessary role in meetings is the clerk. The clerk is responsible for preparing the meeting agenda, guiding the meeting, moderating if necessary and preparing minutes and epistles. The clerk, alongside any elders, is responsible for upholding the discipline of the meeting, sometimes referred to as right, or "Gospel", order. The clerk is entrusted as a "servant of the meeting" not to abuse their influence over the meeting.

A clerk is appointed by the meeting after being nominated by a nominations committee. This is usually for a three year period that can only be renewed once (i.e. for a maximum term of six years). The clerk role may be shared between two or more co-clerks. The clerk, or co-clerks may also have assistant clerks. If the clerk must leave for an item of business, a co-clerk or assistant clerk will fulfil the role instead.

A convenor may carry out the clerk's role in smaller committees.

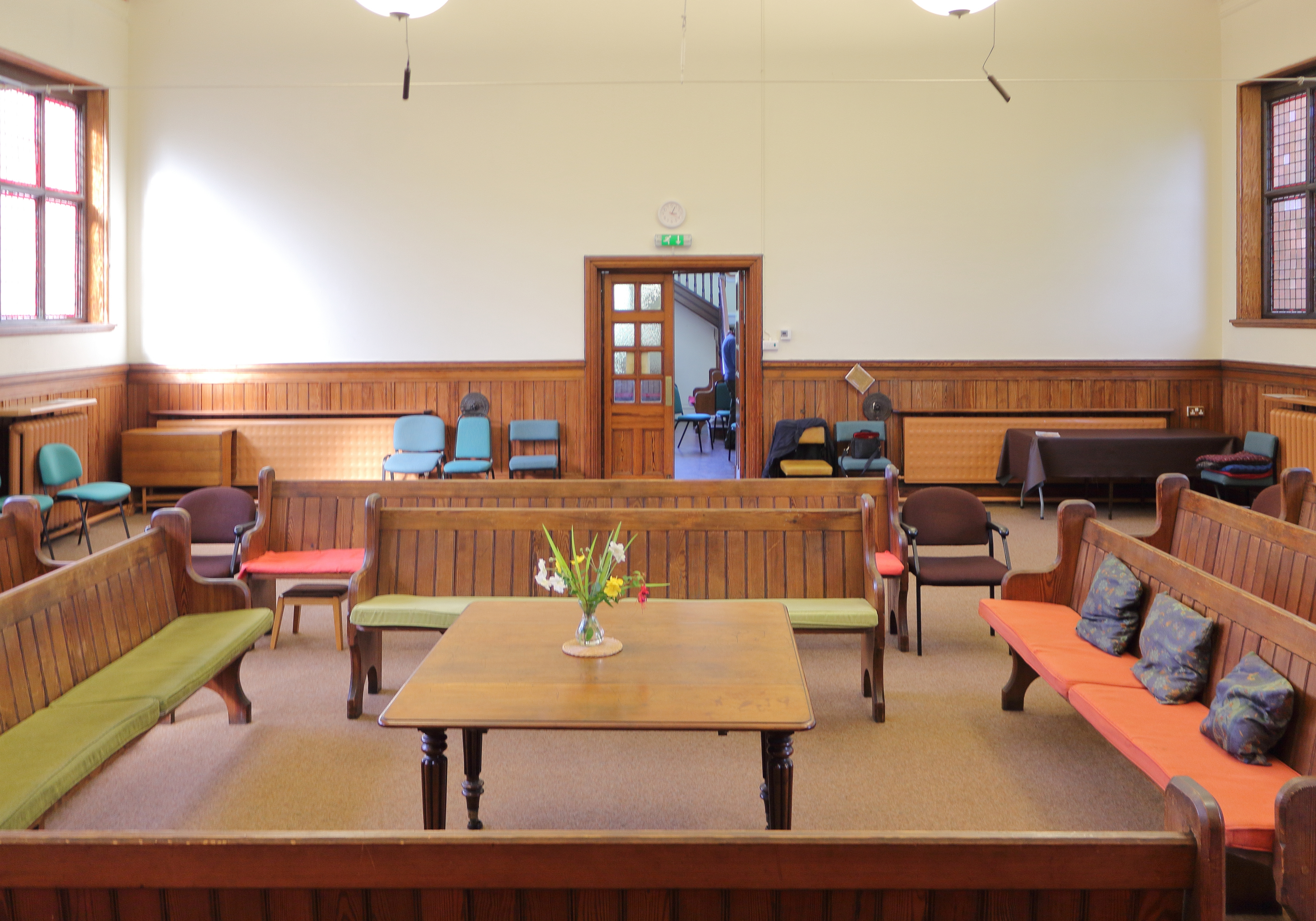
A Quaker Meeting House in Claughton

== The process ==
=== Silence and speaking ===
Meetings begin with a period of extended silence, referred to as waiting worship. Participants are expected to 'quiet themselves' and focus on 'the Inner Light'. The clerk then reads out the agenda in full, before introducing the first item. Those who are not members are expected to ask the clerk's permission to attend meeting for worship for business, which is almost always given.

Once an agenda item has been read out, the meeting silently reflects on the item, waiting for God's guidance. Individuals stand to speak if they feel moved to do so, this is called "vocal ministry". Speakers are expected to make statements which are personal (based on their own experience), independent (not in response to other statements) and succinct; many larger meetings ask people to speak only once per item.

Silence is also observed after every piece of ministry, to allow the meeting to consider the statements and return to a point of reflection. As such, dialogue does not occur in the normal sense. If necessary, the clerk facilitates by encouraging quieter individuals to speak, reminding ones that are speaking at length to conclude, or asking for additional silence.

=== Minute creation and drafting ===
The Clerk uses their judgement to decide when an item has been fully examined, typically when they observe a period of extended silence. They then proceed to write a minute (written statement) which they believe discerns the 'spirit of the meeting' on that item, before reading it to the meeting. Some minutes may have been prepared in advance, especially for routine business, though these will be edited in accordance with any decision or vocal ministry in the meeting. During this initial drafting, Friends will be asked to "uphold" the clerk(s) in prayer, while maintaining the silence.

Individuals may then "speak to the minute" as described as above, though no new material will be accepted. Instead, Friends suggest edits to the minute to ensure it aligns with the sense of the meeting, considers any ministry it accidentally omitted and its language is clear and correct.

After a period of editing, the clerk(s) will ask whether the minute is acceptable. The meeting must eventually "unite" on a minute for it to be accepted, otherwise it is postponed. "Unity in agreement" differs from unanimous agreement, since people may agree as part of the meeting against their personal or rational interests: it may be expressed through silence, or a confirming statement, such as responding "hope so".

=== Concluding ===
An epistle, or letter, is often drafted at the end of yearly meeting sessions. This is addressed "To Friends everywhere," and aims to summarise the business process, and the decisions that the meeting has come to. This is agreed by the meeting in the same way as a minute. They are often read out at other yearly meetings.

The remaining items are dealt with in the same way until finished or the meeting runs out of time. Some meetings, usually yearly meetings, last multiple days. In these, the agenda is split across multiple sessions, with the meeting adjourned during breaks.

Meetings are concluded with another period of extended silence, during which the clerk/co-clerks signs the minute "in and on behalf of" the meeting.

== Influence ==
The practice has been adapted for non-Quakers multiple times in the 21st century. Although there is debate on the viability of transferring the practice without the underlying belief systems, the variance of belief between Quakers, including the existence of Nontheist Quakers, suggests some flexibility.

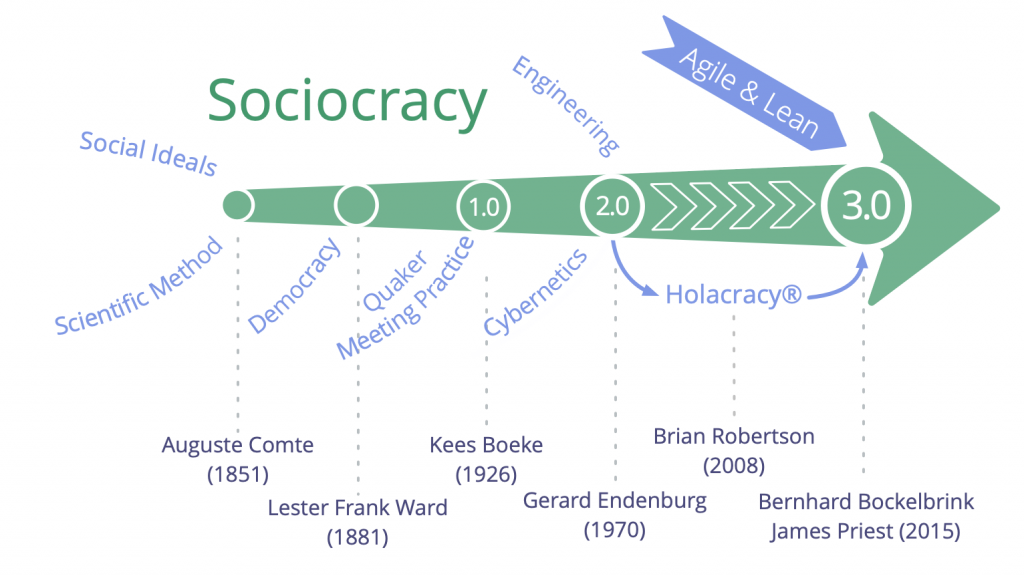
Quaker meeting practice attributed as major milestone in Sociocracy

=== Sociocracy ===
Cornelius 'Kees' Boeke was a Dutch Quaker who founded a Werkplaats Kindergemeenschap based on Quaker principles in 1926. It used a secularized version of Quaker decision-making in which the students would also participate in the running of the school. This went on to be developed by Gerard Endenburg (one of Boeke's students) in the late 1960s to become known as Consent within contemporary Sociocracy.

=== Women Strike for Peace ===
Eleanor Garst was greatly influenced by Quakerism when her husband received unasked-for support from Pennsylvanian Quakers of the War Resisters League for resisting conscription into WWII. Eleanor is accredited with introducing Quaker-style meeting practices to the founding meeting of Women Strike for Peace in 1961. It caught on, and in time became referred to as Consensus, with the emphasis on silence eventually being abandoned.

== See also ==
- Quakers
- Monthly meeting
- Yearly meeting
- Clerk (Quaker)
- Book of Discipline (Quaker)
- Sociocracy
- Consensus
