= Movement for a New Society =

The Movement for a New Society (MNS) was a U.S.-based network of social activist collectives, committed to the principles of nonviolence, who played a key role in social change movements of the 1970s and 1980s.

According to a description from the MNS publication, Building Social Change Communities (1979),

Movement for a New Society (MNS) is a nationwide network of groups working for fundamental social change through nonviolent action. Together we are developing an analysis of present-day society; a vision of a decentralized, democratic and caring social order; a nonviolent revolutionary strategy; and a program based on changed values and changed lives.

== History ==
The precursor to the MNS was A Quaker Action Group (AQAG), founded by Lawrence Scott in 1966. Dissatisfied with the response of the mainstream Quaker church to the United States involvement in the Vietnam War, Scott founded AQAG with the intention of sparking a renewed commitment to the Quaker Peace Testimony.

Frustrated by their failure to achieve this end, AQAG members including Scott and Quaker George Willoughby, refashioned the group as the Movement for A New Society in 1971. Other founding members included Bill Moyer, Berit and George Lakey, Phyllis and Richard Taylor, Lynne Shivers, and Lillian Willoughby.

The members of MNS consciously sought to develop tools and strategies that could be employed to bring about revolutionary change through nonviolent means. The three-part focus of MNS included training for activists, nonviolent direct action and community. The main location for MNS activity was in West Philadelphia. Other locations included Atlanta, Boston, Minneapolis, Ohio, San Francisco, Seattle, Toronto, Tucson, Western Massachusetts and more.

During the 1970s and early 1980s Philadelphia was the base for weekend, two-week and nine-month programs that trained US and international activists in direct action organizing, group process, consensus decision-making, liberation/oppression issues and more. Activist training also happened in other locations and through traveling trainers programs.

MNS did not focus its energies exclusively on one issue or injustice. Its members were involved in working for social change on many fronts, most notably in the movement to end US involvement in the Vietnam War, and during the citizen-led opposition to the expansion of the US nuclear power industry in the mid to late 1970s. MNS members were also active in the anti-nuclear weapons movement, the Pledge of Resistance (anti-US intervention in Central America), feminism, LGBTQ, civil rights, community organizing, and food and worker cooperatives.

MNS was unusual in combining feminist group process, broad analysis of interrelated people's struggles including class and culture, and personal empowerment techniques ranging from music and street theater as political organizing tools to Re-evaluation Counseling. With their group process skills, MNS members often played roles of facilitating meetings and training peacekeepers for large protests. Many MNS-developed techniques, including small-to-large-group consensus decision making, an action structure based on affinity groups, and the idea that proper training was key to successful actions, were widely adopted and adapted by numerous social change campaigns and movements. Prominent among these was the Clamshell Alliance occupation of the Seabrook nuclear power plant construction site May 1, 1977, continuing through the network of affinity-group-based alliances that took direct action for safe energy nationwide and worldwide. MNS also heavily influenced later movements such as the 1999 World Trade Organization protests in Seattle and the Occupy movement of 2011-2012. In turn, MNS was greatly influenced by its association with academics and authors, notably Gene Sharp, nonviolent action theoretician, founder of the Albert Einstein Institution (Cambridge, Mass.), and a major global influence on the nonviolent liberation of South Africa, the Arab Spring and other social justice movements.

The sense of community and the quality of interpersonal relationships was important to MNS members and many lived in cooperative households, practiced Re-evaluation Counseling, and addressed issues of race, class, gender and sexual orientation in their activist training and lives. In West Philadelphia MNS members established a land trust incorporated as a nonprofit "Life Center Association", initially comprising several land trusted buildings to provide training spaces and an organizational office, then expanding to include about 20 cooperative houses at its height. It survives to this day, though far smaller.

Through the cooperatively owned and managed New Society Publishers, MNS members published numerous pamphlets and guidebooks, as well as republishing important works on nonviolence (e.g. We Are All Part of One Another a Barbara Deming Reader in 1984). NSP's cooperatively authored Resource Manual for a Living Revolution (known affectionately as the “monster manual”) and similar publications inspired and guided activists on every continent, even the Tasmanian Wilderness Society’s campaign to prevent the damming of the Franklin River in southern Australia. NSP also published Marshall Rosenberg's Handbook on Nonviolent Communication which became the basis for Rosenberg's work with the Center for Nonviolent Communication.

After several years of decline, MNS membership decided to disband in 1988, due to internal differences regarding priorities, lack of success in becoming multicultural, and the decline of its training programs in Philadelphia. However, its most skilled trainers and organizers redirected their efforts, joining or founding a range of organizations and campaigns across the U.S. Many believed MNS had achieved its primary goal of furthering the understanding and use of Gandhian style nonviolent action to effect significant change. MNS records are archived at the Swarthmore College Peace Collection.

== Legacy ==
New Society Publishers, now based in British Columbia, continues to publish social-change related titles, with an increased emphasis on the practical aspects of environmental sustainability. Douglas & McIntyre bought New Society Publishers in 2008. It was repurchased by the original Canadian New Society publishing group in 2013.

Until his death in October, 2002, Bill Moyer continued to teach his influential Movement Action Plan, eight-stage model for social change movements, to activists around the US and around the world. George Lakey, as founder of the Philadelphia-based Training for Change organization, continued to promote nonviolence as a powerful technique for resisting injustice, along with other MNS members Betsy Raasch-Gilman and Erika Thorne. MNS alum Steve Chase started an activist training program at Antioch University New England and is now Assistant Director of Solidarity 2020 and Beyond. Shel Horowitz and Dina Friedman promote environmentally and socially responsible business. Other former MNS members (Felice Yeskel, Chuck Collins, Betsy Leondar-Wright, Jerry Koch-Gonzalez, Anne Slepian Ellinger, Christopher Mogil Ellinger) were key in founding and sustaining organizations focused on class issues, such as United for a Fair Economy, Class Action, Bolder Giving, and the Program on Inequality and the Common Good of Institute for Policy Studies. Many continue collaborative leadership in a range of causes and one hundred MNS alumni took part in its 50th Anniversary Reunion November 2022.
