= Systemic Consensing =

Group decision-making principle

Systemic Consensing (German: Systemisches Konsensieren) also known as Systemic Consensus is a consensus-oriented group decision-making method. The principle behind the method is that minimizing participant resistance should be the highest concern when making decisions. The method asks participants to score all proposals—including the status quo—according to how much they oppose them, and selects the proposal with the lowest score. The method is equivalent to the better-known score voting.

== History ==
According to Siegfried Schrotta and Erich Visotschnig, the development of a method with students in Graz began in 1982 and was resumed in 2002, leading to the 'Systemic Consensing Principle' and a refined approach. Over the course of their work the pair have published four books, made a website, initiated an online tool, founded an institute, and established a network of trainers.

== Principle ==
The Systemic Consensing Principle is to come as close to consensus as possible by minimizing resistance. Resistance is taken to mean opposition or unhappiness towards a proposal. This is justified on ethical and practical foundations.

Ethically, allowing people to express resistance is seen as fundamental to their human dignity. Making a collective decision that a person opposes, when an option exists which no one opposes, is seen as an unnecessary dismissal of personal will that can't be justified by a majority preference. The asymmetry between positive and negative preference, and the primacy of the negative, is an expression of negative utilitarianism.

Practically, decisions made with less opposition are expected to be more successful, requiring less (or no) monitoring, enforcement or sanctioning. Participants are generally expected to be more constructive in the group if they have the ability to express negativity openly, since "resistance which can't be expressed in the system, turns against the system".

The authors contrast the Systemic Consensing Principle to those of majority and consensus. Majority is seen as the "right of the strong", leading to winner-loser situations. Consensus is seen as the "right of the weak", with the veto right leading to blocking.

== Method ==
Proposals are gathered, with the participants being encouraged to submit as many different proposals as necessary. The current status quo is always included as the so-called "passive option" (formerly also named as "zero option"). This is done on the basis that the current state of affairs may be preferable to all new proposals. This option can be formulated positively as "none of the above option".

The participants are then asked to rate the proposals according to their resistance to them. The proposal with the lowest resistance score is then selected. This is an inversion of typical scoring, where a higher score indicates higher agreement.

The details of how Systemic Consensing is practiced is flexible and dependent on the situation. Scoring could be done with people raising neither, one or both of their hands (a range of 0–2), or by raising numbered cards (e.g. 0–10). The scoring could be done secretly or openly.

== Example ==
Imagine three people, Fritz, Anna and George, who are considering what they should get together as a reward for a hard day of work. Fritz, a vegan, has had bad experiences with the vegan options in most ice-cream stores, so scores ice-cream highly. Anna is mostly fine with all the options, scoring them all low. George is a recovering alcoholic and doesn't want to be tempted by others drinking around him, so scores beer very highly. All three have significant resistance to the default solution, which would be getting nothing, so score it highly. Waffles, as the least resisted option, is group's decision.

Which treat should we get?
	Score proposals according to resistance			
	Ice cream	Waffles	Beer	Default solution: nothing
Fritz	7	0	0	8
Anna	1	2	1	5
George	0	2	9	10
Total	8	4	10	23

== Influence ==
Thanks to the books, talks and workshops, Systemic Consensing has had significant coverage in the German-speaking world, including articles in the newspapers Die Tageszeitung, Die Deutsche Apotheker Zeitung and Die Furche. The voting work-group of Foodsharing.de and the Saxony branch of the Grassroots Democratic Party of Germany consider the use of Systemic Consensing for internal decisions.

Until now, only one of the books has been translated into English.

== See also ==
- Consensus decision-making
- Sociocracy
