= BuyBlue.org =

BuyBlue.org was an online consumers' guide designed to help progressives in the United States choose brands that favored their politics. Its editors rated companies based on their campaign contributions and other factors. Its name refers to the popular idea of the U.S. being sharply divided, culturally and politically, into red states and blue states that voted Republican and Democrat, respectively, in the 2000 election.

The website encouraged users to submit articles that criticize or applaud a company's business practices. The submitting user assigned a binary categorical rating of positive or negative with regards to the company's adherence to progressive business practices as described in the article. The absolute number of articles submitted and each submitted article's rating were used to calculate a company's overall rating. A five-point scale ranked a company's degree of progressiveness or regressiveness according to users' submissions.

The website hosted blogs and message boards designed to steer consumers towards businesses favored by the party, to exert direct political pressure on targeted businesses, and to foster activism among the site's users.

Though this website was geared toward liberals, conservatives could also use it to find out which companies are supporting Republicans.

== Methodology ==
The website's editors used public databases and compiled an estimate of political campaign contributions by a company's three highest executive officers, those executives' spouses, the highest executive officer at any subsidiary company, and any PAC registered by that company. The allocation of donations between Democrats and Republicans determined a company's political contribution rating, with higher ratings awarded to companies that primarily donate to Democrats.

== Rating categories ==
- The Labor & Human Rights category covers article submissions from sources such as Sweatshop Watch and the National Labor Relations Board that address topics including sweatshops, unions and union busting.
- The Environment category covers article submissions from sources such as the Environmental Working Group and Greenpeace that address topics including sustainability, ecosystems and resource recovery.
- The Employment Equality category covers article submissions from sources such as the Institute for Women's Policy Research and the Equal Employment Opportunity Commission that address topics including discrimination, domestic partner benefits, and diversity.
- The Corporate and Social Responsibility category covers article submissions from sources such as United for a Fair Economy and the Council on Economic Priorities that address topics including charitable contributions, community participation, and product safety and product liability.
- The Industry Practices category addresses industry-specific topics.

== Spring 2007 shutdown ==
As of April 23, 2007, the website was shut down, and the following message was posted at the site:

Thanks for your support!

The BuyBlue team would like to thank you for all of your support over the past 2 years, unfortunately we are shutting our virtual doors. We hope that we've been able to educate consumers and inspire people to take action and vote with their wallets. Maybe another group will take up this charge in the future, but for now we can no longer do so. Just because we won't be online any more does not mean that the information we provided cannot be found any longer. You'll want to keep the following information sources in mind. Also, BuyBlue Colorado, an independent organization, will continue to remain operational.

This message was also followed by the statement that BuyBlue's data had been donated to the organization Advomatic.

On September 6, 2007, the site carried a message stating that 'BuyBlue 2.0' would be coming that fall, with the guide returning in a "more partisan and focused" form.

As of March 4, 2010, the site displayed a banner by Advomatic with the organization's slogan and a message stating that it is undergoing scheduled maintenance.
