= Betsy Leondar-Wright =

American sociologist and activist

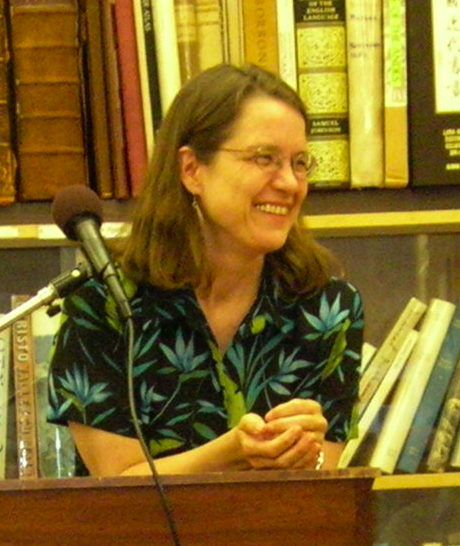
- Leondar-Wright at a talk in Black Oak, AR
- Born: Betsy Wright; January 15, 1956 (age 70); Summit, New Jersey, U.S.
- Education: Princeton University
- Alma mater: Boston College
- Occupations: Author, activist
- Spouse: Gail Leondar-Wright
- Writing career
- Subjects: Classism, Economic stratification, economic justice
- Website: www.classmatters.org

Betsy Leondar-Wright (born January 15, 1956) is an American economic justice activist, sociologist, and author, who writes on class and economic inequality.

== Early life and education ==
Leondar-Wright was raised in a middle-class family, and dropped out of Princeton University to become a full-time activist. She completed her Bachelor of Arts, MA and PhD in sociology at Boston College.

== Activism ==
She was a member of Movement for a New Society (MNS), where she was a member of the Keystone Alliance, organizing rallies and occupations at the Limerick, PA Nuclear Power Plant. While involved with MNS, she published the "Study Guide on Multinational Corporations and the World Economy".

From 1986 to 1988 she was Program Coordinator at Women for Economic Justice, where she organized a coalition for pay equity for women. From 1988 to 1993 she was executive director at the Anti-Displacement Project, an affordable housing organization; three of the tenant groups she organized bought and now manage their apartment complexes as permanently affordable housing. From 1994 to 1997 she was executive director of the Massachusetts Human Services Coalition.

From 1997 to 2006 she was Communications Director for United for a Fair Economy, where she co-authored The Color of Wealth: The Story Behind the U.S. Racial Wealth Divide.

She was on the board of Class Action, a non-profit that raised consciousness about class, race/class intersections and classism. As Program Director from 2010 to 2015, she edited the blog "Classism Exposed".

== Current work ==
From 2015 to 2024 she was an assistant professor of sociology at Lasell College. Her 2012 PhD dissertation focuses on class culture differences in U.S. social change groups. Her book, Missing Class: Strengthening Social Movement Groups by Seeing Class Cultures was published by Cornell University Press in April 2014 and was made into a website, the Activist Class Cultures Kit. Her most recent book is Is It Racist? Is It Sexist? Why Red and Blue White People Disagree, and How to Decide in the Gray Areas which was co-authored with Jessi Streib.

== Personal life ==
She and her spouse, progressive book publicist Gail Leondar-Wright, are one of the first lesbian couples to be legally married in the United States.

== Publishing history ==
Date(s)	Role	Title
1996	Co-author	Mass Billions: The Changing Role of Federal Support for Human Services in Massachusetts for the Massachusetts Human Services Coalition
1999	Co-author	Shifting Fortunes: The Perils of the Growing American Wealth Gap for United for a Fair Economy
1999, 2007	Co-author	Classism curriculum design, chapter in Teaching for Diversity and Social Justice, co-written with Felice Yeskel
2004	Co-author	Black job loss deja vu: think the typical job-loser in today's economy is a white computer programmer whose job has been outsourced to India? Think again. An article from Dollars and Sense
2004	Author	Climbing the White Escalator
2004	Co-editor	The Wealth Inequality Reader in Dollars and Sense
2004–2006	Co-author	Three annual "State of the Dream" reports on racial inequality for United For a Fair Economy
2005	Co-author	"Who are the elites?" Chapter in Inequality Matters
2005	Author	Class Matters: Cross-Class Alliance Building for Middle-Class Activists
2006	Co-author	The Color of Wealth:The Story Behind the U.S. Racial Wealth Divide
2014	Author	Leondar-Wright, Betsy (2014). Missing Class: Strengthening Social Movement Groups by Seeing Class Cultures. Cornell University Press. ISBN 9780801479205.
2025	Co-author with Jessi Streib	Leondar-Wright, Betsy (2025). Is It Racist? Is It Sexist? Why Red and Blue White People Disagree, and How to Decide in the Gray Areas. Stanford University Press. ISBN 9781503641297.

== See also ==
- Classism
- Ford Hall Forum
- Wealth in the United States
- LGBT
