= You Deserve to Know =

The You Deserve To Know campaign, launched by The Agenda Project, featured a video on YouTube criticizing President Barack Obama for speaking with the United States Chamber of Commerce without acknowledging its status as the largest lobbyist in the United States and confronting it about its vehement opposition to vital economic reform.

Agenda Project founder Erica Payne explained the campaign by stating, "The Chamber claims to speak for American business, but half of the Chamber's budget is paid for by 45 big corporations. The President is well aware that the Chamber is in actuality just a high priced lobbyist for a small number of corporations. I hardly think the President will restore our faith in government by fawning over the banks at the center of the financial crisis, oil companies like BP who destroyed the Gulf, and insurance companies who secretly funneled $10 million through the Chamber to fight insurance reform."

The title of the video is a reference to the President's State of the Union address, during which he stated "You deserve to know when your elected officials are meeting with lobbyists."

This brief campaign garnered attention from news sources such as:

- USA Today
- The Huffington Post
- The Washington Post
- MSNBC Live
- The New York Times
