= George Lakey =

American sociologist and activist

- Born: George Russell Lakey; November 2, 1937 (age 89); Bangor, Pennsylvania, U.S.
- Education: Cheyney University; University of Oslo
- Occupations: Activist, sociologist, writer
- Spouse: Berit Mathiesen (m. 1960)

George Russell Lakey (born November 2, 1937) is an activist, sociologist, and writer who added academic underpinning to the concept of nonviolent revolution. He also refined the practice of experiential training for activists which he calls "Direct Education". A Quaker, he has co-founded and led numerous organizations and campaigns for justice and peace.

== Early life and education ==
Lakey was born to Dora M. and Russell George Lakey, a slate miner, in Bangor, Pennsylvania. He was identified as a prospective child preacher for his church, and at age 12, he gave a sermon promoting racial equality as the will of God, although his sermon was not well received at the time. He graduated from Cheyney University in Cheyney, Pennsylvania, and also studied at the University of Oslo in Norway. There he married Berit Mathiesen in 1960 and taught at an Oslo high school. He continued his sociology studies at the University of Pennsylvania in Philadelphia, earning a master's degree and completing coursework for a Ph.D. but never completing it.

== Career ==
=== Activism ===
In the late 1950s, Lakey was active in the ban-the-bomb movement, then participated in the civil rights movement, in 1963 being arrested in a sit-in. The following year he was a trainer for Mississippi Freedom Summer and co-authored his first book, A Manual for Direct Action, which was widely used in the South by the civil rights movement. In 1966 he co-founded the national body A Quaker Action Group (AQAG), whose activities took him in 1967 to Vietnam to participate in the sailing ship Phoenix's protest action in South Vietnam seeking to give medical supplies to the anti-war Buddhist movement there.

In 1970, Lakey was active within AQAG in the successful direct action in the Puerto Rican struggle to stop the U.S. Navy from using the island of Culebra for target practice. In 1971 he helped found Movement for a New Society (MNS), a network of autonomous groups working for a nonviolent revolution. The network featured living collectives and co-ops as well as participation in national movements of the 1970s and '80s. The network's training program at the Philadelphia Life Center Association became highly influential in the US and abroad in spreading Paulo Freire's Popular education and other participatory training methods.

During the 1970s, he also gave national leadership to the Campaign to Stop the B-1 Bomber and Promote Peace Conversion, which succeeded in persuading Congress and President Carter to de-fund this Air Force program. In 1976 he co-organized Men Against Patriarchy, a pioneering anti-sexism movement for men. In 1982 he organized the Pennsylvania section of a national labor/community coalition named "Jobs with Peace" and directed that effort for seven years.

In 1973, Lakey came out in public as a gay man, and joined the LGBT movement, becoming part of what he later would call "Gay Liberation's early visionary days."

In 1991, he co-founded with Philadelphia activist Barbara Smith, Training for Change (TfC). Building on previous training at the Martin Luther King Jr. School for Social Change and Movement for a New Society, Training for Change developed a new pedagogy called "Direct Education". Training for Change did trainings and consultations for activists and nongovernmental organizations in 20 countries.

In 2009, Lakey co-founded Earth Quaker Action Team (EQAT), to build a just and sustainable economy through nonviolent direct action campaigns. The group won its first campaign, forcing PNC Bank to stop financing mountaintop removal coal mining in Appalachia. In that campaign, while in his seventies, Lakey was arrested and also led a 200-mile march.

=== Academia ===
Lakey's first teaching post in higher education was in the Martin Luther King Jr. School of Social Change, a division of Crozer Theological Seminary in Chester, Pennsylvania. Lakey helped formulate the curriculum and then taught there for its first four years, 1965–1969. In this period he systematized the field of "Experiential Nonviolence Training" and the students were supported in efforts to connect field training with theory in direct actions.

He joined the Peace Studies program at the University of Pennsylvania, successfully expanding its undergraduate offerings and the participation of minority students. In addition, he helped lead a University of Pennsylvania group dynamics lab promoting innovative feminist leadership. He also taught peace studies at Haverford College in Haverford, Pennsylvania.

He later taught at Temple University and much later he accepted the endowed Eugene M. Lang Visiting Professorship in Issues of Social Change at Swarthmore College. He continued at Swarthmore College in Swarthmore, Pennsylvania as a Lang Professor and then as a research professor until his retirement.

In 2010, Lakey was named by the National Peace and Justice Studies Association as "Peace Educator of the Year".

== Works ==
- A Manual for Direct Action: Strategy and Tactics for Civil Rights and All Other Nonviolent Protest Movements, co-author with Martin Oppenheimer; Chicago IL: Quadrangle Books, 1965
- In Place of War: Moving toward a New Society, co-author with the American Friends Service Committee working party; lead author: James E. Bristol) New York City NY: Grossman, 1967
- A Manifesto for Nonviolent Revolution: Toward a Just World Order, Vol. 1 Boulder CO: Westview Press, 1982 (originally published by War Resisters International (WRI) in 1972)
- Strategy for a Living Revolution: a World Order Book; New York City: Grossman, and San Francisco CA: W.H. Freeman, 1973
  - Revised and published as Powerful Peacemaking, Philadelphia, PA: New Society Publishers, 1987
  - Revised and published as Toward a Living Revolution, London, England: Peace News, 2013, then published with the same title in a North American edition by Wipf & Stock, 2016 (The central thesis of the above book on nonviolent revolution is found in "A Manifesto for Nonviolent Revolution" also by George Lakey and released by War Resisters International (WRI), 1975 (see above).)
- Leadership for Change, Towards a Feminist Model (co-author with Bruce Kokopeli), Philadelphia, PA: New Society Publishers, no date
- Moving toward a New Society (co-author), Philadelphia, PA: New Society Publishers, 1975
- No Turning Back: Lesbian and Gay Liberation in the ‘80s (co-author with Erika Thorne), Philadelphia, PA: New Society Publishers, 1983
- Grassroots and Nonprofit Leadership: A Guide for Organizations in Changing Times (co-author with Berit Lakey, Rod Napier, and Janice Robinson), Philadelphia, PA: New Society Publishers, 1995; new edition (self-published), 2016; also published in translation in Cairo, Belgrade, and Bangkok
- Opening Space for Democracy: Curriculum and Manual for Training for Third Party Nonviolent Intervention; co-author with Daniel Hunter), Philadelphia, PA: Training for Change, 2004
- Facilitating Group Learning: Strategies for Success with Diverse Adult Learners. San Francisco CA: Jossey-Bass, 2010
- Viking Economics: How the Scandinavians got it right and how we can, too; New York, NY and London, England: Melville House Publishing, 2016
- How We Win: A Guide to Nonviolent Direct Action Campaigning; New York, NY and London, England: Melville House Publishing, 2018
- Dancing with History: A Life for Peace and Justice; New York, NY: Seven Stories Press, 2022

Internet Development and Writing:

- Global Nonviolent Action Database, internet – ongoing; over 1,000 researched cases from nearly 200 countries with focus on campaigns back to ancient Egypt that used nonviolent direct action. Searchable, and includes a narrative for each case. Developed by Lakey with Swarthmore College and other university students, with Swarthmore's Peace and Conflict Studies, the Peace Collection, and the Lang Center for Civic and Social Responsibility.
- Waging Nonviolence, an ongoing on-line blog where Lakey has been a regular featured columnist since 2010.

== See also ==
- List of peace activists
