= The Agenda Project: America the Beautiful =

2011 political video

The Agenda Project: America the Beautiful In May 2011, The Agenda Project, New York-based non-profit political organization, released its “America the Beautiful” campaign, also known as “Granny off the Cliff.” The video was created in response to Rep. Paul Ryan’s proposed Medicare cuts, as part of The Path to Prosperity, the Republican Party’s long-term budget proposal.

The video dramatizes Paul Ryan's proposal to privatize Medicare. The video – which shows an elderly woman getting thrown off a cliff – asserts that the Ryan plan will hurt elderly Americans.

== Overview ==
The Agenda Project is a progressive public policy advocacy organization whose mission is to make regular Americans the driver of public policy. The Agenda Project is the publisher of the Daily Agenda – an on-line hub for the progressive movement. Erica Payne, the founder of the Agenda Project, is a political strategist, communications expert, policy analyst, and author.

== Media coverage ==
The campaign garnered major media coverage, including:

- Over 145,000 views on YouTube
- 8.9 million media impressions
- Featured on The O’Reilly Factor on Fox News
- Played five times on The Sean Hannity Show on Fox News
- Featured on The Caucus political blog of The New York Times
- Featured on The Ed Show on MSNBC
