= Felice Yeskel =

American LGBTQ and economic equality activist

Felice Yeskel (April 6, 1953 – January 11, 2011) was an American activist who advocated for LGBT rights, class issues, and economic equality. Yeskel founded and ran, for 14 years, the Stonewall Center at the University of Massachusetts, Amherst; Yeskel also co-founded United for a Fair Economy and Class Action.

== Early life ==
Felice Yeskel was born on April 6, 1953, and raised in Manhattan, the only child of Harry and Phyllis Yeskel. Yeskel was Jewish. Yeskel's father drove a truck to collect flour sacks from bakeries around New York City.

Yeskel's first experiences of class difference began when she attended a program for "gifted children" at Hunter College Elementary School, with many economically privileged children. Yeskel understood that her working-class family's apartment was much smaller than that of many of her classmates' and she experienced feelings of shame and confusion — feelings that would inspire her later activism.

Yeskel's first organizing efforts occurred while she was attending Seward Park High School; she worked to eliminate (and defeated) the dress code requirement that female students wear dresses to school. She graduated from Seward Park in 1970, a committed feminist and anti-war activist.

== Education ==
Yeskel's activism continued at the University of Rochester, where she earned a B.A. in 1974. She moved to California for a time, working there with Harvey Milk against the anti-gay Briggs initiative.

She then moved to the Philadelphia area and earned a master's degree in psychology in 1979. While in Philadelphia, Yeskel was involved with Movement for a New Society, which employed non-violent action to fight racism, sexism, classism, and more.

After 1982, Yeskel was a leader of the Seneca Women's Peace Encampment at the same time she began working on her Ed.D. in Organizational Development at UMass Amherst, completing her degree in 1991.

== Career ==
=== Stonewall Center ===
A number of homophobic incidents occurred on the UMass Amherst campus in 1984. Yeskel approached campus administration, armed with research undertaken or her dissertation, and convinced higher ups that the university did not adequately address the needs of its LGBTQ students. In 1985, Yeskel founded the Program for Gay, Lesbian and Bisexual Concerns, with her as its director, a position she would hold for the next 14 years. The organization was nestled within the university's Office of Student Affairs. In 1995, the program was renamed The Stonewall Center: A Lesbian, Bisexual, Gay, Queer, and Transgender Educational Resource Center, and in 2004, "asexual" and "intersex" were added to the name.

The center was the third of its kind in the nation on a college campus — after similar centers founded at the University of Michigan and the University of Pennsylvania. The center continues to be a social hub for the campus, and provides education, brings speakers to campus, and improves community outreach.

=== Other ventures ===
During the 1990s, she was also part of the Diversity Works Project which ran workshops in area high schools aimed at fighting homophobia, sexism, racism, and classism.

In 1995, Yeskel and Chuck Collins formed United for a Fair Economy. Together the two co-authored Economic Apartheid in America: A Primer on Economic Inequality and Insecurity. Yeskel's work with United for a Fair Economy brought recognition to issues of class.

Yeskel founded, with fellow activist Jenny Ladd, the organization Class Action. In 1995, the pair brought together four people from upper-class backgrounds and four people from poor or working-class backgrounds, all involved in social change work, to meet in dialogue once a month for six hours. In 2001, this work expanded into workshops and more cross-class dialogue groups throughout Western Massachusetts. Yeskel and Ladd founded Class Action in 2004 in order to further expand this work and to "raise consciousness about the taboo topic of class and to address classism, both locally and nationally"

Yeskel also served as a faculty member in the Social Justice Education Program at the University of Massachusetts, Amherst.

== Personal life ==
In 2004, Yeskel legally married her partner of many years, Felicia Mednick. The pair had previously married in the summer of 1997, though the union was not yet legal in the United States. Yeskel and Mednick had one daughter, Shira Ma'ayan.

In 2012, her spouse Felicia Mednick donated Yeskel's papers to the Smith College Special Collections.

== Death ==
Felice Yeskel died on January 11, 2011, at the age of 57, after a two-year battle with cancer.

== Honors ==
- Lifetime achievement award from the Working Class Studies Association
- MotherWoman's Pillar Award (in 2010)

== Works ==
- The Consequence of Being Gay: A Report on the Quality of Life for Lesbian, Gay, and Bisexual Students at the University of Massachusetts at Amherst (1985) Amherst, Ma.: University of Massachusetts
- Multicultural Organizational Development on Campus: Lesbian, Gay, and Bisexual Concerns (1992) Pelham, Ma.
- Lesbian, Gay, Bisexual, and Transgender Campus Organizing: A Comprehensive Manual (1995) [with Curtis F. Shepard, Charles L. Outcalt, National Gay and Lesbian Task Force
- Economic Apartheid in America: A Primer on Economic Inequality and Insecurity (2000) New York: W.W. Norton [with Chuck Collins and United for a Fair Economy]
- Class Lives: Stories from Across Our Economic Divide (2014) Ithaca: ILR Press, Cornell University Press [with Chuck Collins, Jennifer Ladd, Maynard Seider, Class Action]
