= Patriotic Millionaires =

American political organization

- Formation: 2010
- Founder: Erica Payne
- Type: Advocacy group
- Region served: United States
- Members: 200+
- Website: patrioticmillionaires.org

Patriotic Millionaires is a nonpartisan organization of Americans with high net worth who promote the restructuring of the American tax system so that wealthy people pay a greater share of their income in taxes. Patriotic Millionaires was founded in 2010 by Erica Payne to advocate for expiration of the Bush tax cuts. Qualification for membership requires either $1 million in annual income, or more than $5 million in assets.

Some notable members include Lawrence Lessig, Jeffrey Gural, Roberta Kaplan, Chuck Collins, George Zimmer, Norman Lear, Whitney Tilson, and Abigail Disney.

== History ==
Patriotic Millionaires was originally founded in 2010 by Erica Payne under the name "Patriotic Millionaires for Fiscal Strength". Its purpose was to push for an expiration of the Bush tax cuts during the Presidency of Barack Obama. By 2010, the group had about 45 members, this rose to 150 by 2011 and over 200 by 2019. In 2012 President Obama mobilized support from prominent members of the Patriotic Millionaires group to advocate for the Buffett Rule. The group announced a merger with Wealth for the Common Good in 2015, which is now part of the organization. In 2017 Patriotic Millionaires supported the "March on McDonald's" alongside Movement for Black Lives and Color of Change, in a bid to achieve unionization and a $15 minimum wage at McDonald's.

== Positions ==
Patriotic Millionaires support a higher minimum wage, a progressive tax system, closing tax loopholes, and reducing the influence of money in politics through campaign finance reform. In addition to opposing the Bush tax cuts, the group opposed the Tax Cuts and Jobs Act of 2017. The group supports a reduction in economic inequality. Members of the group believe that concentration of wealth is "destabilizing" and can lead to violence.
