= The Agenda Project =

U.S. non-profit political organization

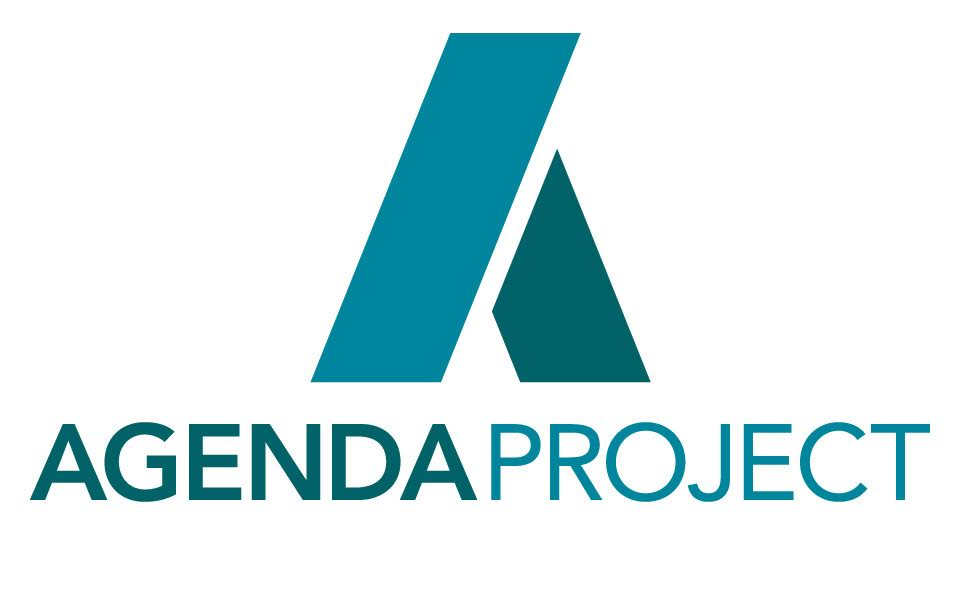
Logo of The Agenda Project

The Agenda Project is a non-profit political organization based in Washington, D.C. It was founded in 2010 by political strategist and author Erica Payne, who had previously founded the consulting firm The Tesseract Group. The organization aims to connect stakeholders in order to build relationships and deepen their understanding of progressive ideas and specific policy issues.

== Campaigns ==
The Agenda Project has launched campaigns such as America the Beautiful, F*ck Tea, Hate Begets Hate, Vote Sanity, and Patriotic Millionaires. F*ck Tea was launched in the summer of 2010 and was intended to urge Americans to "dismiss the Tea Party and to promote the progressive cause".

In October 2014, AP Action Fund released a commercial entitled "Republican Cuts Kill." The commercial displayed various federal and state elected Republicans saying "cut" alongside the amount of reduction in spending for the Center for Disease Control and National Institute of Health.
