= Erica Payne =

American political consultant (born 1969)

Erica C. Payne
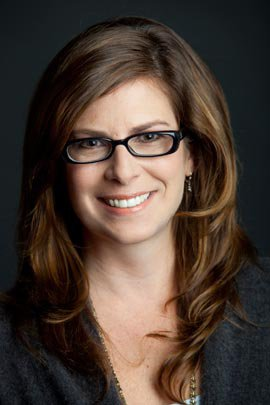
- Founder of The Agenda Project
- Born: October 8, 1969 (age 56); Raleigh, North Carolina
- Education: Masters of Business Administration from the Wharton School at the University of Pennsylvania (2000), Bachelor of Arts from the University of North Carolina at Chapel Hill(1991)
- Occupations: Public policy analyst, progressive political commentator, author, progressive political strategist
- Writing career
- Genres: Non-fiction, News
- Subjects: Politics, Progressive Movement,
- Notable works: Top Wonks: The Economy, The Practical Progressive
- Literary movement: American progressivism
- Website: The Agenda Project

Erica C. Payne is an American public policy commentator, author and progressive strategist.

Before joining The Agenda Project full‐time in 2010, Payne led the Tesseract Group, a boutique consulting firm that provided strategy and communications advice to select public policy and political organizations. In that role, Payne served as a senior strategist for the Roosevelt Institute to envision and build a new public policy think tank for economic and finance sector policy. At the Roosevelt Institute, Payne co‐edited "Make Markets Be Markets: Restoring the Integrity of the US Financial Markets" and produced a major conference by the same name that included George Soros, Elizabeth Warren, Simon Johnson, Lynn Turner and other progressive advocates. Other Tesseract clients included: the Brennan Center for Justice at New York University, Citizens for Responsibility and Ethics in Washington, the Howard Gilman Foundation, and the Center for Independent Media among others.

Prior to founding the Agenda Project and the Tesseract Group, Payne co‐founded the Democracy Alliance, a donor collaborative whose partners have invested over $100 million in progressive organizations.

Her early career included serving as Deputy National Finance Director for the Democratic National Committee during the 1996 presidential re‐election campaign and as a consultant to a number of campaigns and political organizations. In addition to her public sector work, Payne has held senior marketing positions in the private sector.

== Education ==
She is on the Board of Advisors of the Public Diplomacy Collaborative at the Kennedy School at Harvard University. She is also on the Board of Advisors of Health Care for American Now. Payne has an MBA from the Wharton School at the University of Pennsylvania (2000) and a BA from the University of North Carolina at Chapel Hill (1991).

== The Agenda Project ==
The Agenda Project's stated goal is to "return normal Americans to the center of the policy debate by cultivating an understanding of public policy, facilitating common action, and connecting the best ideas and the strongest leaders with engaged citizens, elected officials, the media, political insiders, and experts through a variety of in-person and on-line platforms." The Agenda Project is responsible for progressive campaigns such as America the Beautiful, F*ck Tea, Hate Begets Hate, Vote Sanity, and Patriotic Millionaires for Fiscal Strength, a petition to President Barack Obama from millionaires, who demand that the President let the Bush tax cuts expire for those who make $1 million or more, where Payne commented that "Only 375,000 Americans have income over $1 million" and "You're asking a small number of people to recognize that our country is in part responsible for their prosperity." Most recently, their criticism of President Obama for speaking to the Chamber of Commerce, called You Deserve To Know, was highlighted by a variety of news sources, including Fox News and CBS, and featured Payne's commentary accusing the President for lying to the American people, and failing to cater to his base.

== The Practical Progressive ==
Payne is the author of The Practical Progressive: How to Build a 21st Century Political Movement, which Jonathan Alter of Newsweek called "a blueprint for a progressive conspiracy to help save the country." In 2008, Payne was interviewed by Julian Brookes, the online editorial director of the Progressive Book Club, to discuss her motivations for the book and for the progressive cause, as a whole. Payne stated that her intention was to map out the progressive infrastructure by asking the question: "If you were a chief progressive strategist, what five or six groups would you say are absolutely essential?" Payne continues her work of the Practical Progressive through the Agenda Project.

== Media appearances ==
Erica Payne has appeared on Fox Business Network, The Ed Schultz Show, MSNBC, and CNBC. In addition, she has also appeared on The O'Reilly Factor, GritTV, and CNN's Parker Spitzer.

Since Payne is the President of the Agenda Project, she is often interviewed by major news networks explaining the organization's recent campaigns. In reaction to the controversial "F*ck Tea" Campaign, Payne was seen on CBS defending the aggressive nature of the campaign. She has been featured in The New York Times and The Washington Post for her attack on President Obama's decision to speak to the Chamber of Commerce. When asked about it directly by USA Today, Payne replied:

The Chamber claims to speak for American business, but half of the Chamber's budget is paid for by 45 big corporations. The President is well aware that the Chamber is in actuality just a high priced lobbyist for a small number of corporations. I hardly think the President will restore our faith in government by fawning over the banks at the center of the financial crisis, oil companies like BP who destroyed the Gulf and insurance companies who secretly funneled $10 million through the Chamber to fight insurance reform,

In Payne's editorials on the Huffington Post she has written about hate crimes committed against Muslims, as well as repeatedly pointing out and denouncing the ties between financial firms and Congressional staff, which she believes to be the most obvious sign of corruption in the American political system. In addition, Payne has attacked the Tea Party by arguing they are a growing threat to American tolerance.

On August 23, 2012, Erica Payne debated Peter Schiff on Fox Business where she called Peter a "moron" when he said that consumer demand is not a job creator.

== Personal life ==
Payne grew up in Raleigh, North Carolina. She has a BA from the University of North Carolina at Chapel Hill (1991) and an MBA from the Wharton School at the University of Pennsylvania (2000). After spending time in Boston, Colorado, Los Angeles, and Washington, Payne moved to New York City in 2001, where she now resides.
