= Chuck Collins =

American economics writer

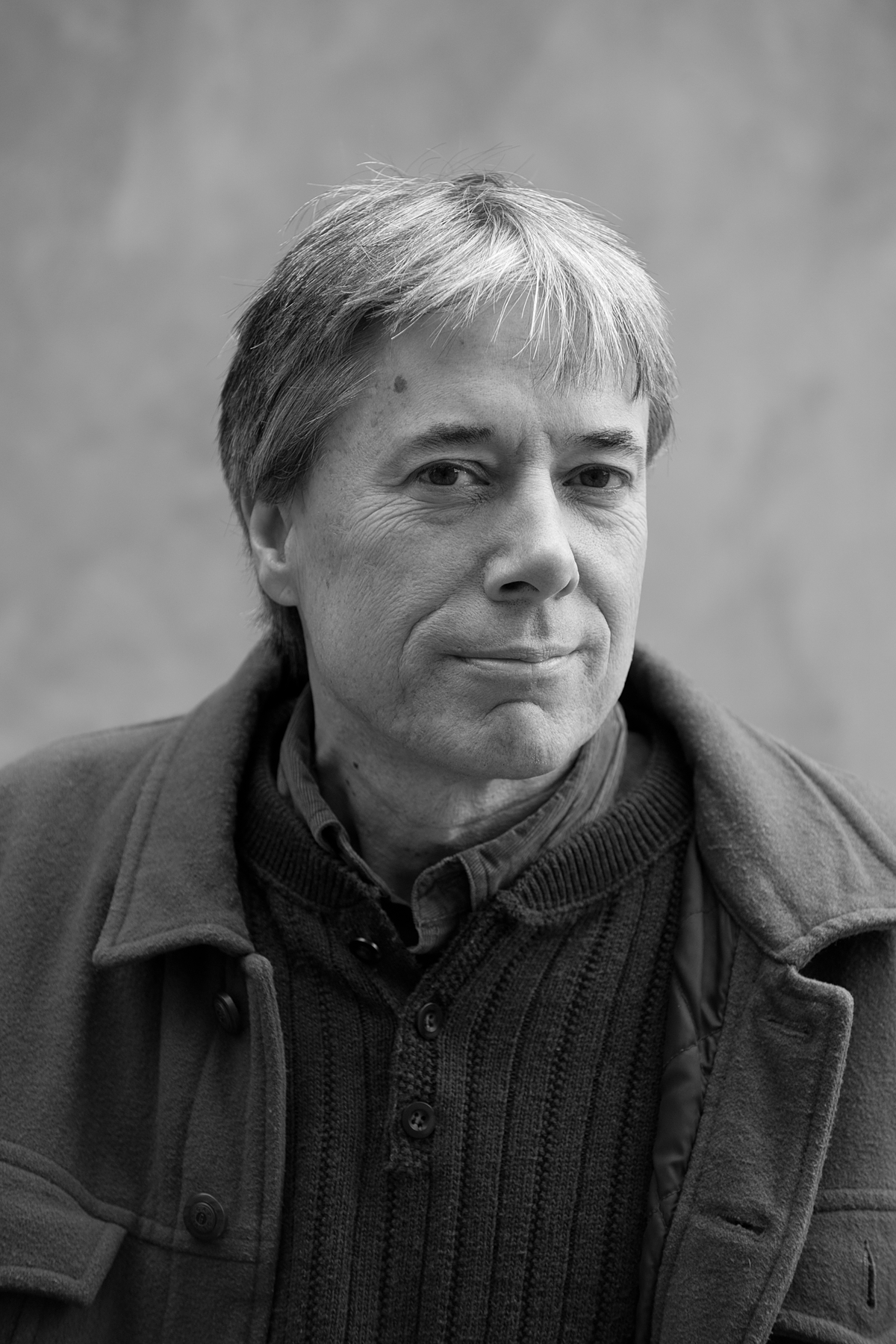
- Born: October 19, 1959 (age 67); Madison, Wisconsin
- Education: Hampshire College (BA); Southern New Hampshire University (MS)
- Occupations: Writer, social activist
- Relatives: Oscar F. Mayer (great-grandfather)

Chuck Collins (born October 19, 1959) is an American author and a senior scholar at the Institute for Policy Studies in Washington, D.C., where he directs the Program on Inequality and the Common Good. He is also co-founder of Wealth for Common Good. He is an expert on economic inequality in the US, and has pioneered efforts to bring together investors and business leaders to speak out publicly against corporate practices and economic policies that increase economic inequality.

Collins is the great-grandson of Oscar F. Mayer, the founder of the Oscar Mayer meat processing brand.

== Early life ==
Collins was born in Madison, Wisconsin, and grew up in suburban Detroit where he attended the Cranbrook Schools. At age seven, he witnessed the 1967 Detroit riots and became concerned about inequality. He was involved in social change, including Earth Day 1970. He raised money for guide dogs and informed his neighborhood about the environment at a young age.

Collins first gained public attention in 1985, when he gave an inheritance of $500,000 to several foundations at the age of 26. When his libertarian conservative father Edward learned of his intentions, he was afraid his son was a Marxist, though Collins instead stated that he would rather be called a "Gandhian or Christian" and later left to live in a commune.

== Career ==
Between 1983 and 1991, Collins worked at the Institute for Community Economics, based in Greenfield, Massachusetts, providing technical advice to community land trusts and mobile home resident cooperatives. Between 1991 and 1995, he was director of the HOME Coalition in Massachusetts and a field organizer for the Tax Equity Alliance of Massachusetts (now the Mass Budget and Policy Center). In 1995, he co-founded, with Felice Yeskel and S.M. Miller, United for a Fair Economy in Boston, Massachusetts, a left-leaning national organization devoted to education about growing income and wealth inequality.

In 2005, he became a senior scholar at the Institute for Policy Studies, where he co-edits the web site, Inequality.org, and directs the Program on Inequality and the Common Good. In 2008, he cofounded Wealth for the Common Good, which subsequently merged in 2015 with the Patriotic Millionaires.

At the Institute for Policy Studies, Collins research has looked at income and wealth inequality and the racial wealth divide. He has co-authored a number of studies including "Billionaire Bonanza" exploring the share of wealth flowing to the top 1 percent and Forbes 400, and the "Ever Growing Gap", which examines the future of the racial wealth divide.

== Publications ==
Collins has written a number of books about inequality, tax policy, social change philanthropy, and the influence of concentrated wealth.

- Robin Hood Was Right: A Guide to Giving Your Money for Social Change (2000, co-authored with Pam Rogers)
- Economic Apartheid in America: A Primer on Economic Inequality and Insecurity (2000, revised 2005, co-authored with Felice Yeskel)
- Wealth and Our Commonwealth: Why America Should Tax Accumulated Fortunes (2003, co-authored with Bill Gates Sr.)
- 99 to 1: How Wealth Inequality is Wrecking the World and What We Can Do About It (2012)
- Born on Third Base: A One Percenter Makes the Case for Tackling Inequality, Bringing Wealth Home, and Committing to the Common Good (2016)
- The Wealth Hoarders: How Billionaires Spend Millions to Hide Trillions (2021)
- Altar to An Erupting Sun (2023), a novel of eco-fiction
- Burned by Billionaires: How Concentrated Wealth and Power Are Ruining Our Lives and Planet (2025)
