= Gerard Endenburg =

Dutch businessman (1933–2025)

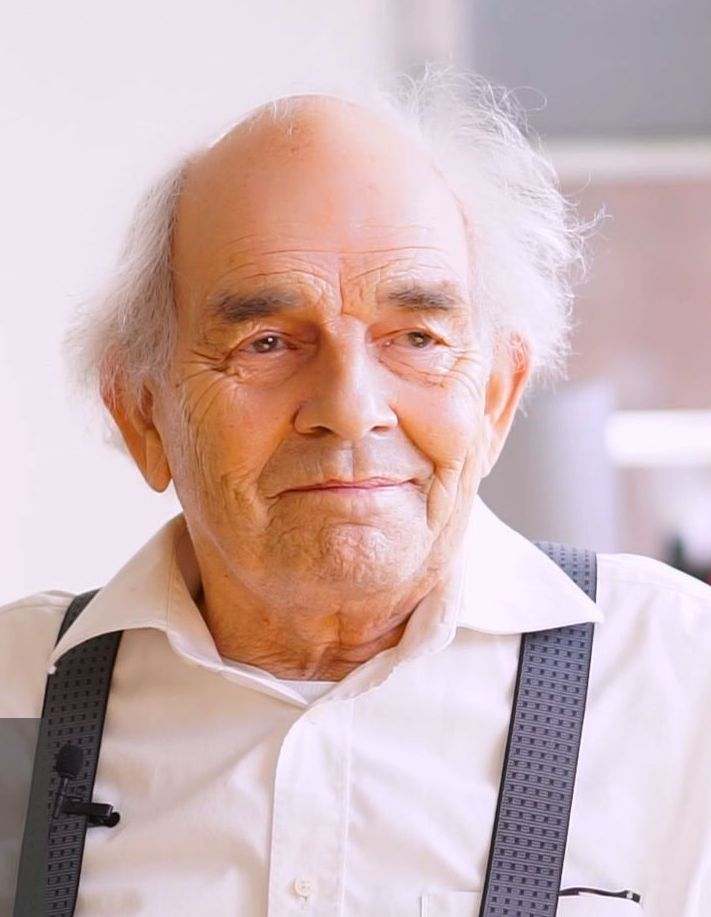
- Endenburg in 2018
- Born: 14 April 1933; Rotterdam, Netherlands
- Died: 29 July 2025 (aged 92); Rotterdam, Netherlands
- Education: University of Twente
- Known for: Sociocracy

Gerard Endenburg (14 April 1933 – 29 July 2025) was a Dutch businessman who developed the Sociocratic Circle Organisation Method (SCM), which is a decision-making method for governing and managing organizations and societies based on equivalence and draws inspiration from cybernetics. Endenburg was inspired by the idea of sociocracy of Kees Boeke.

== Life and career ==
Endenburg was born in Rotterdam on 14 April 1933. He was a Quaker, and attended a Quaker boarding school, the Werkplaats Kindergemeenschap [Children's Community Workshop], where he was influenced by Kees Boeke and his wife Betty Cadbury and the ideas of sociocracy. The school involved students in consensus decision-making.

He became general manager of his family's engineering company, Endenburg Elektrotechniek BV, in the mid-1960s, and in the 1970s started pioneering and applying the sociocratic method of organizing within the company. In 1978, Endenburg founded the Sociocratic Center Netherlands to develop and implement the sociocratic approach in other organizations, serving as its director. In 1992, Endenburg obtained a doctoral degree from the University of Twente, based on his dissertation Sociocratie als Sociaal Ontwerp, translated into English as Sociocracy as Social Design. Endenburg was an honorary professor in Organizational Learning at Maastricht University.

Endenburg died in Rotterdam on 29 July 2025, at the age of 92.

== Bibliography ==
- Sociocracy as Social Design: its characteristics and course of development, as theoretical design and practical project. Translated by Pearson, Murray; Bowden, Clive. Delft: Eburon. 1998. ISBN 978-90-5166-604-5. OCLC 67947732.
- Sociocracy: the Organization of Decision-Making: "no objection" as the Principle of Sociocracy. Translated by Bowden, Clive. Delft: Eburon. 1998. ISBN 978-90-5166-605-2. OCLC 41641481.

== See also ==
- Thesis circle
