= Thesis circle =

A thesis circle involves a number of students and at least one professor, lecturer or instructor who collaborate in supervising and coaching final (undergraduate or MSc) projects. This tool for supervising students working on their thesis, also known as "thesis rings", was developed in the 1990s at Maastricht University (Romme & Nijhuis, 2000).

== Overview ==
Participants in a thesis circle meet regularly to discuss the progress of work on (mostly individual) final projects. Students are in charge of planning and chairing the sessions as well as managing and distributing information (e.g. draft chapters). The professor brings his/her disciplinary expertise and knowledge into the meetings of the thesis circle.

An important characteristic of thesis circles is the principle of switching roles: students participating in thesis circles frequently switch between their role as writer of a thesis (final project) and their role as co-supervisor of the other students in the circle (Romme, 1999). Research has demonstrated that role switching is a valuable source of learning between peers (McDougall & Beattie, 1997; Dochy, Segers & Sluijsmans, 1999). This mechanism serves to accelerate and deepen learning on key issues and challenges encountered in doing a final project (Romme & Nijhuis, 2000). In an educational sense, thesis circles are a particular form of collaborative learning, inspired by the sociocratic circular approach as well as Vygotsky's theory of the zone of proximal development. In terms of organizational theory, thesis circles are also inspired by the notion of the Learning Organization (e.g., Mazen, Jones & Sergenian, 2000).

Thesis circles appear to have a positive effect on both the quality of the supervision process and the performance of the students involved (Rompa & Romme, 2001; Romme, 2003). For example, a former participant in a thesis circle at Tilburg University observed that "the concept of a master thesis circle is an excellent idea to promote feedback among students and thus create a truly collaborative environment" (source).

Many thesis circles accomplish a culture of reflective (i.e. non-rhetorical) questioning and dialogue (Damen, 2007; Van Seggelen-Damen & Romme, 2014). The supervision style of the professor appears to have a strong impact on whether this culture of reflection comes about: in thesis circles with a coaching rather than instruction oriented supervisor, more reflective questioning and dialogue was observed (Van Seggelen-Damen & Romme, 2014). Furthermore, reflective questioning among participants in thesis circles enhances learning in terms of so-called multi-perspective cognitive outcomes (Suedfeld et al., 1992; Curşeu and Rus, 2005). Moreover, students with a stronger need for cognition (Cacioppo et al., 1996) and more openness to experience (McCrae & Costa Jr., 1997) engage more in reflection (Van Seggelen-Damen & Romme, 2014).

Thesis circles have been set up in Maastricht University, Tilburg University, University of Utrecht, Eindhoven University of Technology, Open University of the Netherlands, University of Twente, Rotterdam School of Management and Fontys University of Applied Sciences.

== See also ==
- Collaborative learning
- Zone of proximal development
- Sociocracy
- Need for cognition
- Learning organization

== References and further reading ==
- Cacioppo, J.T., R.E. Petty, J.A. Feinstein and W.B.G. Jarvis (1996). Dispositional differences in cognitive motivation: The life and times of individuals varying in need for cognition. Psychological Bulletin, 119(2): 197-253.
- Curşeu, P.L. and D. Rus (2005). The cognitive complexity of groups: A critical look at team cognition research. Cognitie, Creier, Comportament, vol. 9(4): 681-710.
- Damen, I.C.M. (2007). Making pictures in front of a mirror: A cognitive perspective on reflection in learning, doctoral dissertation, Tilburg University, Ridderkerk: Ridderprint.
- Dochy, M. Segers and D. Sluijsmans (1999). The use of self-, peer and co-assessment in higher education: a review. Studies in Higher Education, vol. 24: 331-350.
- Mazen, A.M., M.C. Jones and G.K. Sergenian (2000). Transforming the class into a learning organization. Management Learning, vol. 31(2): 147-161.
- McCrae, R.R. and P.T. Costa Jr. (1997). Personality trait structure as a human universal. American Psychologist, 52(5): 509-516.
- McDougall, M. and R.S. Beattie (1997). Peer mentoring at work: the nature and outcomes of non-hierarchical developmental relationships, Management Learning, vol. 28(4): 423-437.
- Romme, A.G.L. and J. Nijhuis (2000). Samenwerkend Leren in Afstudeerkringen, Groningen: Wolters-Noordhoff. Translation in English available via this link.
- Romme, A.G.L. (1999). Redistributing power in the classroom: the missing link in problem-based learning. In: J. Hommes, P.K. Keizer, M. Pettigrew & J. Troy (eds.), Learning in a Changing Environment, p. 109-126. Dordrecht-London-Boston: Kluwer Academic Publishers.
- Romme, A.G.L. (2003). Organizing education by drawing on organization studies. Organization Studies, vol. 24: 697-720.
- Rompa, R.M.G. and A.G.L. Romme (2001). Kwaliteit van samenwerking en leerprestaties in afstudeerkringen. Pedagogische Studiën, vol. 78: 298-312.
- Suedfeld, P., P.E. Tetlock and S. Streufert (1992). Conceptual/integrative complexity. In: C.P. Smith (ed.), Motivation and Personality: Handbook of Thematic Content Analysis, p. 393-400. Cambridge, Cambridge University Press.
- Van Seggelen-Damen, I.C.M. (2013). Reflective personality: Identifying cognitive style and cognitive complexity. Current Psychology, vol. 32(1): 82-99.
- Van Seggelen-Damen, I.C.M. and A.G.L. Romme (2014). Reflective questioning in management education: Lessons from supervising thesis projects. SAGE Open, vol. 4(2): 1-13.
