= A Quaker Action Group =

American nonviolent organization against the war in Vietnam

A Quaker Action Group (AQAG) was founded in Philadelphia during the summer of 1966 to "apply nonviolent direct action as a witness against the war in Vietnam".

== History ==
Founding member Lawrence Scott was a Quaker and radical pacifist who had worked for the American Friends Service Committee (AFSC) in the 1950s, but resigned in protest at what he saw as the AFSC's preference for words over action. AQAG, which was based in the peace committees of the Religious Society of Friends' New York and Philadelphia Yearly meetings, aimed to renew the Society of Friends commitment to its historic peace testimony.

In 1966, AQAG attempted to mail relief packages to North Vietnam, only to have the US Postal Service refuse the delivery. When they collected money for the North and South Vietnamese Red Cross Societies, the Treasury seized the donated funds.

In March 1967, members of AQAG sailed to North Vietnam in the yacht Phoenix, carrying medical supplies for North Vietnamese wounded by the American bombing. The protest generated wide media coverage.

In 1971, East Pakistan was attempting to break free from the government in West Pakistan; it would become Bangladesh. The overwhelming public sentiment in the U.S. was in favor of Bangladeshi independence. Very few Americans were aware that the US government was providing arms to Pakistan, which it was using to suppress the independence of Bangladesh. AQAG decided to take action to publicize the shipping of arms from Baltimore to Pakistan. On July 14, 1971, members of AQAG took to Baltimore Harbor in small boats and kayaks to blockade the Padma, a ship loaded with weapons the U.S. was secretly sending to Pakistan. Media coverage of this quixotic action made national news and led to the stopping of U.S. support of Pakistan against Bangladesh.

== Legacy ==
In the early seventies, AQAG, having abandoned its goal of transforming the Society of Friends, evolved into the Movement for a New Society, a self-styled "transformational network" dedicated to spreading the practice of non-violent practices throughout the social change networks in North America, and which would play a key role in the anti-nuclear movement of the 1970s.

== Other Quaker Action Groups ==
Following the pattern of AQAG, several Quaker action groups were formed in the UK in the late 1960s, most notably in Manchester and London. These groups focused mainly on pacifist campaigns, community living, and local projects such as providing food and shelter for homeless people.

== See also ==
- Religious Society of Friends
- Bill Moyer
