= United for a Fair Economy =

American left-leaning nonprofit organization

- Formation: 1995; 31 years ago Boston, Massachusetts, U.S.
- Founders: Chuck Collins; Felice Yeskel
- Website: www.faireconomy.org

United for a Fair Economy (UFE) is an American left-leaning nonprofit organization. Co-founded by Chuck Collins and Felice Yeskel in 1995, it describes itself as "raising awareness that concentrated wealth and power undermine the economy, corrupts democracy, deepens the racial divide, and tears communities apart...supporting and helping build social movements for greater equality." Its current executive director is Jeanette Huezo.
