= Sociocracy =

System of governance using consent-based decision-making

Sociocracy is a theory of governance that seeks to create psychologically safe environments and productive organizations. It draws on the use of consent, rather than majority voting, in discussion and decision-making by people who have a shared goal or work process.

The Sociocratic Circle-Organization Method was developed by the Dutch electrical engineer and entrepreneur Gerard Endenburg and is inspired by the work of activists and educators Betty Cadbury and Kees Boeke, to which Endenburg was exposed at a young age while studying at a school led by Boeke.

Sociocracy has informed and inspired similar organizational forms and methods, including Holacracy and the self-organizing team approach developed by Buurtzorg.

== 19th century ==
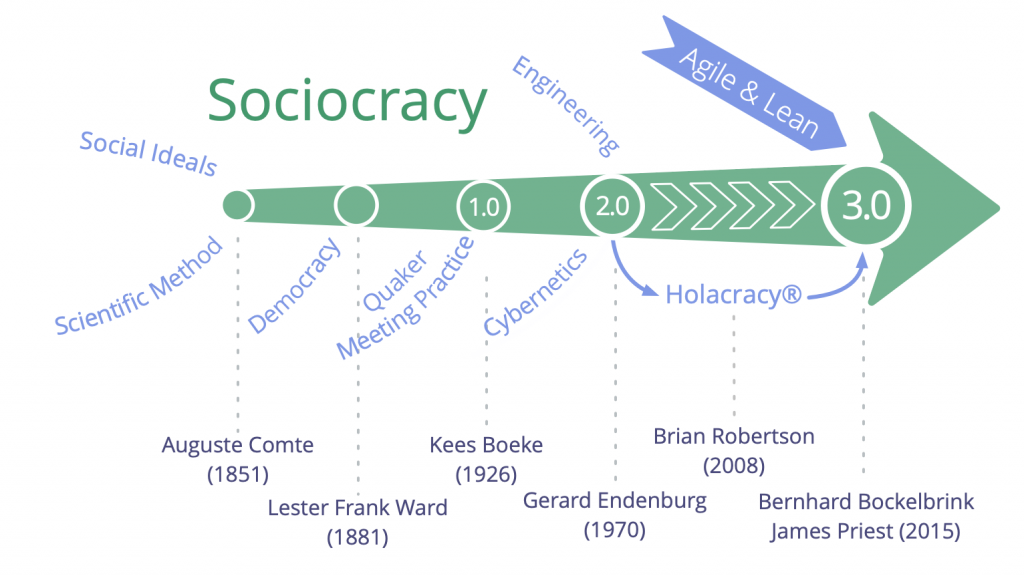
Influences and history of Sociocracy 3.0

The word 'sociocracy' is derived from the Latin socius meaning companions, colleagues, or associates; and the Greek cratia which refers to the ruling class, as in aristocracy, plutocracy, democracy, and meritocracy.

It was coined in 1851 by French philosopher Auguste Comte, as a parallel to sociology, the science that studies how people organize themselves into social systems. Comte believed that a government led by sociologists would use scientific methods to meet the needs of all the people, not just the ruling class. American sociologist Lester Frank Ward in an 1881 paper for the Penn Monthly was an active advocate of a sociocracy to replace the political competition created by majority vote.

Ward expanded his concept of sociocracy in Dynamic Sociology (1883) and The Psychic Factors of Civilization (1892). Ward believed that a well educated public was essential for effective government, and foresaw a time when the emotional and partisan nature of contemporary politics would yield to a more effective, dispassionate, and scientific discussion of issues and problems. Democracy would thus eventually evolve into a more advanced form of government, sociocracy.

== Early 20th century ==
The Dutch pacifist, educator, and peace worker Kees Boeke and his wife, English peace activist Beatrice Boeke-Cadbury, updated and expanded Ward's ideas by implementing the first sociocratic organizational structure in a school in Bilthoven, Netherlands they co-founded in 1926. The school still exists: the Children's Community Workshop (Werkplaats Kindergemeenschap). Boeke saw sociocracy (in Dutch: Sociocratie) as a form of governance or management that presumes equality of individuals and is based on consensus. This equality is not expressed with the 'one man, one vote' law of democracy but rather by a group of individuals reasoning together until a decision is reached that is satisfactory to each one of them.

To make sociocratic ideals operational, Boeke used consensus decision-making based on the Quaker business method, which he described as one of the first sociocratic organizations. Another is his school of approximately 400 students and teachers in which decisions were made by everyone working together in weekly "talkovers" to find a mutually acceptable solution. The individuals in each group would then agree to abide by the decision. "Only when common agreement is reached can any action be taken, quite a different atmosphere is created from that arising from majority rule." Boeke defined three "fundamental rules": (1) That the interests of all members must be considered and the individual must respect the interests of the whole. (2) No action could be taken without a solution that everyone could accept, and (3) All members must accept these decisions when unanimously made. If a group could not make a decision, the decision would be made by a "higher level" of representatives chosen by each group. The size of a decision-making group should be limited to 40 with smaller committees of 5–6 making "detailed decisions". For larger groups, a structure of representatives is chosen by these groups to make decisions.

This model placed a high importance on the role of trust. For the process to be effective, members of each group must trust each other, and it is claimed that this trust will be built over time as long as this method of decision-making is used. When applied to civic governance, people "would be forced to take an interest in those who live close by". Only when people had learned to apply this method in their neighborhoods could the next higher level of sociocratic governance be established. Eventually representatives would be elected from the highest local levels to establish a "World Meeting to govern and order the world."

"Everything depends on a new spirit breaking through among men. May it be that, after the many centuries of fear, suspicion and hate, more and more a spirit of reconciliation and mutual trust will spread abroad. The constant practice of the art of sociocracy and of the education necessary for it seem to be the best way in which to further this spirit, upon which the real solution of all world problems depends." —Kees Boeke, "Sociocracy: Democracy as it might be". (May 1945)

== Late 20th century and onwards ==
In the late 1960s and early 1970s Gerard Endenburg, an electrical engineer and former student of Boeke's, further developed and applied Boeke's principles in the electrical engineering company he first managed for his parents and then owned. Endenburg sought to replicate the culture of cooperation and harmony, he had experienced in the Boekes school, in this company. He also recognized that, in a company with a diverse and changing workforce, he could not wait for workers to trust each other before they could make collective decisions. To solve this problem, Endenburg integrated his understanding of physics, cybernetics, and systems thinking to further develop the social, political, and educational theories of Comte, Ward, and Boeke.

After years of experimentation and application, Endenburg developed a formal organizational method called the Sociocratic Circle Organizing Method (Sociocratische Kringorganisatie Methode). It was based on a "circular causal feedback process", now commonly called the circular process and feedback loops. This method uses a hierarchy of circles corresponding to units or departments of an organization, but it is a circular hierarchy—the links between each circle combine to form feedback loops up and down the organization.

All policy decisions, those about allocation of resources and that constrain operational decisions, require the consent of all members of a circle. Day-to-day operational decisions are made by the operations leader within the policies established in circle meetings. Policy decisions affecting more than one circle's domain are made by a higher circle formed by representatives from each circle. This structure of linked circles that make decisions by consent maintains the efficiency of a hierarchy while preserving the equivalence of the circles and their members.

In the 1980s, Endenburg and his colleague Annewiek Reijmer founded the Sociocratisch Centrum (Sociocratic Center) in Rotterdam.

=== Essential principles ===
Endenburg's policy decision-making method was originally published as being based on four essential principles, all in order to emphasize that the process of selecting people for roles and responsibilities was likewise subject to the consent process. As explained below, however, it is now taught through the method of three principles, as Endenburg had originally developed:

==== Consent governs policy decision making (principle 1) ====
Decisions are made when there are no remaining "paramount objections", that is, when there is informed consent from all participants. Objections must be reasoned and argued and based on the ability of the objector to work productively toward the goals of the organization. All policy decisions are made by consent, although the group may consent to use another decision-making method. Within these policies, day-to-day operational decisions are normally made in the traditional way. Generally, objections are highly valued to hear every stakeholder's concern. This process is sometimes called "objection harvesting". It is emphasized that focusing on objections first leads to more efficient decision making.

==== Organizing in circles (principle 2) ====
The sociocratic organization is composed of a hierarchy of semi-autonomous circles. This hierarchy, however, does not constitute a power structure as autocratic hierarchies do, instead resembling a horizontal association, since the domain of each circle is strictly bounded by a group decision. Each circle has the responsibility to execute, measure, and control its own processes in achieving its goals. It governs a specific domain of responsibility within the policies of the larger organization. Circles are also responsible for their own development and for each member's development. Often called "integral education," the circle and its members are expected to determine what they need to know to remain competitive in their field and to reach the goals of their circle.

==== Double-linking (principle 3) ====
Individuals acting as links function as full members in the decision-making of both their own circles and the next higher circle. A circle's operational leader is by definition a member of the next higher circle and represents the larger organization in the decision-making of the circle they lead. Each circle also elects a representative to represent the circles' interests in the next higher circle. These links form a feedback loop between circles.

At the highest level of the organization, there is a “top circle”, analogous to a board of directors, except that it works within the policies of the circle structure rather than ruling over it. The members of the top circle include external experts that connect the organization to its environment. Typically these members have expertise in law, government, finance, community, and the organization's mission. In a corporation, it might also include a representative selected by the shareholders. The top circle also includes the CEO and at least one representative of the general management circle. Each of these circle members participates fully in decision-making in the top circle.

==== Elections by consent (principle 4) ====
This fourth principle extends principle 1. Individuals are elected to roles and responsibilities in open discussion using the same consent criteria used for other policy decisions. Members of the circle nominate themselves or other members of the circle and present reasons for their choice. After discussion, people can (and often do) change their nominations, and the discussion leader will suggest the election of the person for whom there are the strongest arguments. Circle members may object and there is further discussion. For a role that many people might fill, this discussion may continue for several rounds. When fewer people are qualified for the task, this process will quickly converge. The circle may also decide to choose someone who is not a current member of the circle.

=== The "three principles" ===
In the first formulations of the Sociocratic Circle-Organizing Method, Endenburg had three principles and regarded the fourth, elections by consent, not as a separate principle but as a method for making decisions by consent when there are several choices. He considered it part of the first principle, consent governs policy decisions, but many people misunderstood that elections of people to roles and responsibilities are allocations of resources and thus policy decisions. To emphasize the importance of making these decisions by consent in the circle meetings, Endenburg separated it into a fourth principle.

=== Consent vs. consensus ===
Sociocracy makes a distinction between consent and consensus in order to emphasize that circle decisions are not expected to produce a "consensus" in the sense of full agreement. In sociocracy, consent is defined as "no objections", and objections are based on one's ability to work toward the aims of the organization. Members discussing an idea in consent-based governance commonly ask themselves if it is "good enough for now, safe enough to try". If not, then there is an objection, which leads to a search for an acceptable adaptation of the original proposal to gain consent.

Sociocratisch Centrum co-founder Reijmer has summarized the difference as follows: "By consensus, I must convince you that I'm right; by consent, you ask whether you can live with the decision".

== See also ==
- Consensus democracy
- Collaborative e-democracy
- Collective intelligence
- Consensus decision-making
- Cooperative
- Direct democracy
- Heterarchy
- Hierarchical organization
- Holacracy
- Inclusive democracy
- Libertarian socialism
- Mature minor doctrine
- Open-source governance
- Polycentric law
- Scientocracy
- Self-governance
- Strategy Markup Language
- Subsidiarity
- Systems thinking
- Viable system model
