= Tax protester history in the United States =

Person who resists paying U.S. taxes

A tax protester, in the United States, is a person who denies that he or she owes a tax based on the belief that the Constitution of the United States, statutes, or regulations do not empower the government to impose, assess or collect the tax. The tax protester may have no dispute with how the government spends its revenue. This differentiates a tax protester from a tax resister, who seeks to avoid paying a tax because the tax is being used for purposes with which the resister takes issue.

== Origin of American tax protesters ==
People have protested taxation at various times in the history of the United States, sometimes violently.

In the colonial era, Americans insisted on their rights as Englishmen to have their own legislature raise all taxes. Beginning in 1765 the British Parliament asserted its supreme authority to lay taxes, and a series of American protests began that led directly to the American Revolution. The first wave of protests attacked the Stamp Act 1765, and marked the first time Americans from each of the Thirteen Colonies met together and planned a common front against taxes the colonists considered illegal. At the Boston Tea Party, colonists threw British tea into Boston Harbor because it contained a hidden tax Americans refused to pay. The British responded by trying to crush traditional liberties in Massachusetts, leading to the Revolutionary War in 1775.

In 1794, settlers in western Pennsylvania responded to a federal tax on liquor with the Whiskey Rebellion. President George Washington led an army to crush the rebellion—the rebels dispersed and federal supremacy in taxation was assured. The Fries Rebellion saw German Americans in Pennsylvania protest new federal taxes on houses in 1798. It also failed, but when the low-tax Democratic Republican Party came to power in 1801, it repealed the whiskey and land taxes. Anger at the Tariff of 1828 led South Carolina to reject the federal law, until President Andrew Jackson threatened to send in the army to enforce it. The tariff was lowered, again and again, at Southern insistence, until 1861. During the Civil War, with Republicans in control, the tariff was raised to produce needed revenue; after the war it was kept high to encourage industrialization, and became a major issue with conservative Bourbon Democrats such as President Grover Cleveland opposing, and Republicans led by William McKinley promoting tariffs as the route to national wealth. In each of these cases, some opponents of the tax in question contended that it was not merely bad, but exceeded the authority of the body that enacted it.

The Civil War saw the enactment of the first federal income tax, as a temporary wartime measure. A federal income tax in 1894 was declared unconstitutional by the Supreme Court. In response, conservatives (led by Senator Nelson Aldrich) wrote and the nation passed the 16th Amendment in 1909. The goal was to shift away from tariffs to a more widely based tax, which proved essential in financing World War I.

The Great Depression made tax delinquency widespread during the presidency of Franklin D. Roosevelt, when income taxes increased dramatically to pay for New Deal programs and U.S. involvement in World War II.

== The modern tax protester movement ==
The modern tax protester movement appears to have originated in the 1940s and spread in the mid-1970s, proclaiming legally frivolous arguments that the federal tax on individual income is legally void, unconstitutional, or inapplicable to various forms of income such as wages.

=== Early example: tax protest in transition ===
Connecticut industrialist Vivien Kellems was an early advocate of the position that the tax laws were ineffective. In 1948, frustrated that the government had not reduced the historically high tax rates assessed during World War II, Kellems refused to withhold payroll taxes for her employees. She did not dispute the propriety of the tax at that time, but contested the power of the government to require her to collect taxes on its behalf.

The IRS then seized the money owed from her bank account. She brought suit against them and, in a book she wrote, asserted that she won, although she did not challenge the constitutionality of tax withholding itself.

She lost a separate case challenging the constitutionality of withholding itself, and continued to pursue legal battles and appeals until her death in 1975, ultimately unsuccessful in challenging the withholding of tax. The tax-protester movement began to develop a greater following in the late 1960s and early 1970s. Many books, lectures and other materials promised to help people avoid having to pay taxes.

Another early protester was Arthur J. Porth, who argued that the Sixteenth Amendment to the U.S. Constitution should itself be declared unconstitutional, under his theory that the income taxes under the Internal Revenue Code of 1939 imposed "involuntary servitude" in violation of the Thirteenth Amendment. That argument was ruled to be without merit in Porth v. Brodrick, United States Collector of Internal Revenue for the State of Kansas. He continued his tax protester activities and was eventually convicted of willful failure to file returns and other tax crimes; see United States v. Porth.

C. George Swallow was convicted of tax evasion and filing false tax returns. In 1962, his convictions were upheld on appeal. In 1963, in a separate appeal, the Court of Appeals for the Tenth Circuit also rejected (1) his argument that the income tax laws and regulations are so complex that it is impossible for a taxpayer to comprehend and comply with them, and that the tax laws therefore violate the Fifth Amendment, (2) his argument that the income tax laws are unconstitutionally arbitrary, unfair and discriminatory; (3) his argument that the tax proceeds are used for unconstitutional purposes such as the economic welfare of certain groups of taxpayers, foreign people, and foreign governments; and (4) his argument that certain provisions of the Internal Revenue Code violate the establishment of religion clause of the First Amendment.

=== Modern tax protesters: Positions based on legally frivolous arguments ===
In another early case, Lamb v. Commissioner, the taxpayer argued that because his income was not received in the form of gold or silver currency, none of the income was taxable. He also argued that his income was not taxable because Federal Reserve notes were bogus and counterfeit under the Constitution. In 1973, the United States Tax Court rejected those arguments.

Also in 1973, a disbarred attorney named Jerome Daly lost an appeal on his conviction for willfully failing to file federal income tax returns. In rejecting Daly's appeal, the United States Court of Appeals for the Eighth Circuit noted that one of Daly's contentions involved his "seemingly incessant attack against the federal reserve and monetary system of the United States. His apparent thesis is that the only 'Legal Tender Dollars' are those that contain a mixture of gold and silver and that only those dollars may be constitutionally taxed. This contention is clearly frivolous."

In a case before the United States Tax Court in 1974, Everett and Dorothy Vernaccini argued that the Internal Revenue Service should allow them certain deductions on the theory that the record keeping requirements of Internal Revenue Code section 274 were unconstitutional under the Thirteenth Amendment (prohibiting slavery and involuntary servitude), and under the theory that the record keeping requirements violated 42 U.S.C. § 1994 (which prohibits "peonage"). The Tax Court rejected those arguments.

In 1975, the term "tax protester" began to appear in reported court decisions. The first two reported federal cases may have been Gilbert v. Miriami and United States v. Scott, coincidentally decided only two days apart. In Gilbert v. Miriami, the taxpayer (Walter Gilbert) sued the District Director of Internal Revenue (Charles Miriami) asking for injunctive and declaratory relief from enforcement of the internal revenue laws, including a request for a judgment that the statute prohibiting most suits to restrain the assessment or collection of Federal taxes was unconstitutional. The court rejected the taxpayer's claims.

In Scott, the court noted that an undercover government agent had sworn out an affidavit regarding the agent's infiltration into a "tax-protester" organization. The case involved James Walter Scott, the leader of that organization. Scott had failed to file tax returns from 1969 to 1972, based on Constitutional arguments against the validity of the income tax. Scott argued unsuccessfully that the Sixteenth Amendment was not properly ratified, that federal reserve notes were not legal tender and that he was not required to report their receipt as income, and that he was not required to file tax returns if he felt they would incriminate him. The United States Court of Appeals for the Ninth Circuit upheld Scott's conviction.

In 1977, the United States District Court for the Northern District of Texas, in the case of Ex parte Tammen, referred to a tax-protester group called the "United Tax Action Patriots" or "UTAP":

The evidence shows that the organized tax-protester group is growing rapidly. It has spread eastward from the West Coast and is adding substantially and wrongfully to the workload of the federal courts. The goal of UTAP is to do away with federal income taxation by making the burden so heavy on the IRS and the federal courts that the government will have to yield. It is their philosophy that the Sixteenth Amendment was improperly passed and therefore invalid, and that anyone attempting to enforce the income tax laws is violating the rights of the taxpayers and should be treated as a criminal.

The organization meets on a regular basis for the purpose of teaching its members the various and sundry methods of obstructing the Internal Revenue Service. Many of their speakers travel about the country to appear on the programs at these meetings. The members are told at these meetings that they should file protest type tax returns, commonly known as "porth" returns, containing only the name and address of the taxpayer; and that they should object to the completion of the form on various and sundry constitutional grounds. They are also instructed to file W-4 statements claiming as many as 99 exemptions to avoid the withholding of any tax from their salaries. Since such returns will obviously result in the matter being referred to the Audit Division of the Internal Revenue Service, they are further instructed that upon being requested to appear for an audit they should resist, if possible; and that if forced to appear, they should make every effort to disrupt such proceedings to the point of making a farce of them. They are told that in all cases they should avoid giving any correct or meaningful answers to questions propounded to them. If their actions ultimately result in court proceedings, they are to take whatever action is necessary to delay, obstruct and disrupt all such proceedings. Their philosophy involves the subversion, not only of the Internal Revenue Service, but also of the federal judicial system by tying up its courts in fruitless proceedings involving tax protesters.

In the early 1980s, World War II veteran and former Posse Comitatus member Gordon Kahl contributed to the radicalization of tax protester discourse. Kahl considered that the American government was not only illegitimate but actively hostile to citizens' interests. After he was killed in 1983 in a shootoout with the police, he was considered a martyr by other tax protesters. This helped disseminated his views, including within the sovereign citizen movement.

Ideas associated with the tax protester movement have been forwarded under different names over time. These ideas have been put forth, for example, in the broader Christian Patriot, Posse Comitatus and sovereign citizen movements, which generally assert that the Constitution has been usurped by the federal government. More recently, tax protesters have styled themselves as the "Tax Honesty Movement".

=== Level of civil and criminal tax protester cases ===
Tax protester cases appear to be a relatively small percentage of total Federal tax decisions. An "unscientific" May 2, 2006 search of one database used by tax lawyers, certified public accountants, and other tax professionals revealed 56 likely decisions in the year 2003 where the term "tax protester" was used and 42 such decisions in 2004. Seventy-two likely tax protester decisions were rendered in 2005, or less than 7% of the approximately 1,121 Federal tax decisions (including Tax Court and all district court, bankruptcy court, appeals courts and U.S. Supreme Court tax cases) rendered during that year. These statistics do not take into account the fact that some reported, rendered decisions involve multiple levels (trial court, appellate court) of the same case. They also do not take into account cases where taxpayers presented tax protester arguments but the court did not mention the term "tax protester" in its decision (e.g., where the court instead used the legal term "frivolous" or another similar term). The statistics also do not take into account the decisions for which the courts rendered a judgment but no written opinion. The statistics include both civil and criminal tax cases.

== Prohibition on IRS use of the designation ==
In 1998, the U.S. Congress passed a prohibition on the use of the term "illegal tax protester" by officers and employees of the Internal Revenue Service. The prohibition stemmed from complaints about the excessive use of the term not only to describe persons who raised frivolous theories, but against any persons who protested the amount of their tax assessment. Specifically, section 3707 of the Internal Revenue Service Restructuring and Reform Act of 1998 states that IRS personnel:

(1) shall not designate taxpayers as illegal tax protesters (or any similar designation); and
(2) in the case of any such designation made on or before the date of the enactment of this Act [i.e., made on or before July 22, 1998]--

(A) shall remove such designation from the individual master file; and
(B) shall disregard any such designation not located in the individual master file."

Following this ban, some agents have resorted to euphemisms like "Constitutionally challenged" to replace the banned designation. Further, subsection (b) of section 3707 specifically authorized IRS personnel to use the term "nonfiler" to describe certain taxpayers.

This prohibition has had no bearing on the courts, which continue to use the term. For instance, in Hattman v. Commissioner, a per curiam opinion issued in September 2005 (and joined by future Supreme Court Justice Samuel Alito), the United States Court of Appeals for the Third Circuit stated:

It is readily apparent that Hattman's appeal and "petitions" in this Court, as well as his petition for redetermination filed in the Tax Court, are nothing other than the thinly veiled arguments of a tax protester. These types of tax protester arguments have been rejected as patently frivolous, and require no additional analysis here.

Ironically, the Congressional Committee Report on the legislation that introduced the prohibition on the use of the term by the IRS used the term "tax protester" in a different section to describe frivolous anti-tax arguments that should be given no weight. In a section of the report discussing the burden of proof in tax hearings, the Committee stated that although the IRS carries the burden of overcoming evidence that a tax assessed is not owed, "Implausible factual assertions, frivolous claims, or tax protester-type arguments are not credible evidence."

== Old arguments and new ==
Since the advent of the tax protester movement, all the arguments that have been raised in actual court proceedings have ultimately been deemed incorrect by the courts. Many tax protesters have taken these setbacks to mean that the courts, the Congress, and the executive branch are conspiring to continue receiving the revenue which pays their salaries and supports their benefits.

Within the tax protester movement, there has been discord as to which arguments are appropriate to bring, based in part on the belief that different courts will respond in different ways to certain arguments. Attorney Lowell Harrison "Larry" Becraft Jr, who has spent much of his career defending tax protesters, has recently decried "innocents who today believe certain legal arguments popular years ago, but which were litigated by ill prepared, desperate people and lost. To continue going down such dead end roads and to follow these dead arguments will only result in disaster".

Furthermore, in addition to those who express heartfelt beliefs about the tax laws, some con artists have been known to take advantage of the beliefs of tax protesters by profitably engaging in "tax scams". Such scams have included "the marketing of bogus trusts, 'untax' kits or other devices that would ostensibly allow people to avoid paying income taxes".

== Notable tax protesters ==
Some people who do not pay income taxes have been able to do so successfully for many years. Others have been arrested for tax evasion or other tax crimes, and have been prosecuted, convicted and imprisoned. The following sections describe some notable proponents of tax protester arguments (in the narrow legal sense of arguments that are legally frivolous).

=== John L. Cheek ===
John L. Cheek was a pilot employed by American Airlines. Beginning with the 1980 tax year, Cheek stopped filing Federal income tax returns. He was eventually charged with six counts of willfully failing to file Federal income tax returns under 26 U.S.C. § 7203 for 1980, 1981, and 1983 through 1986. He was also charged with tax evasion under 26 U.S.C. § 7201 for years 1980, 1981, and 1983.

At his criminal trial, Cheek represented himself. He stated that he sincerely believed that the tax laws were being unconstitutionally enforced, and that his actions were lawful. Cheek specifically testified that he believed he was not required to file tax returns or pay taxes. He also contended that his wages from a private employer did not constitute income under the internal revenue laws. Cheek argued that he therefore had acted without the "willfulness" required for a criminal tax conviction.

Cheek was convicted, but his conviction was reversed by the United States Supreme Court because of an erroneous jury instruction. The Supreme Court remanded the case for a re-trial with a correct jury instruction.

In the re-trial, the jury rejected Cheek's claim that he believed that wages were not taxable. He was again convicted. The second conviction was upheld by the United States Court of Appeals for the Seventh Circuit, and the United States Supreme Court let that decision stand, denying Cheek's petition for a writ of certiorari. Cheek was sentenced to a year and a day in prison, and was released from prison in December 1992.

=== Jack Ray Carr ===
On June 20, 2012, Jack Ray Carr, of Baton Rouge, Louisiana, was convicted after a jury trial of one count of corruptly interfering with the due administration of the Internal Revenue laws, four counts of filing false income tax returns and one count of aiding and assisting in the preparation of a false income tax return. The evidence at trial established that Carr threatened violence against a federal agent, filed false documents and tax returns with the IRS, and attempted to pay his tax debt with fraudulent bonds, fictitious money orders and a fake check. On three successive personal income tax returns, Carr falsely reported that his and his wife's income was "$0.00," despite earning hundreds of thousands of dollars in total during the 2001, 2002 and 2003 tax years. In 2009, on two tax returns, Carr reported more than $100,000 of federal income tax withholdings based on fictitious IRS 1099-OID Forms, one of the Dirty Dozen methods, attached to the tax returns that Carr filed. In doing so, Carr claimed more than $150,000 of fraudulent tax refunds from the U.S. government.

On January 6, 2014, Carr was sentenced to over six years in federal prison. Carr is scheduled for release on July 11, 2018.

=== Irwin Schiff ===
Libertarian activist and author Irwin Schiff was convicted on three separate occasions in connection with Federal tax crimes: (1) for tax years 1974 and 1975; (2) for tax years 1980 through 1982 and, (3) most recently, for tax years 1997 through 2002, and has spent several years in Federal prisons. Among the arguments raised by Irwin Schiff in various court cases are the argument that no tax assessment can be made unless a tax return has been voluntarily filed; the argument that the Internal Revenue Service, in enforcing the income tax, seeks to impose a tax not authorized by the taxing clauses of the United States Constitution; and the argument (still displayed, as of early 2007, on Schiff's internet web site) that "[f]or tax purposes, 'income' only means corporate 'profit.' Therefore, no individual receives anything that is reportable as 'income.'" All the arguments were rejected by the courts.

Schiff's latest convictions came in late 2005, when he was found guilty of multiple counts of filing false tax returns, aiding and assisting in the preparation of false tax returns filed by other taxpayers, conspiring to defraud the United States, and income tax evasion. Schiff was sentenced to 13 years and 7 months in prison (including a year for contempt of court), and was ordered to pay over $4.2 million in restitution. He was scheduled for release in July 2017, but died in prison on October 16, 2015.

=== Roger Elvick ===
A former North Dakota farmer who had lost his farm in a business deal, Elvick originally sold a book, The Redemption Package, that encouraged people to claim refunds from the Internal Revenue Service (IRS). In 1991, he was found guilty of conspiracy to impede justice in connection with federal tax filings under 18 U.S.C. § 371 Upon release, he resumed his anti-tax activities. Around 1999, he conceived the strawman theory, according to which an individual has two personas, one of "flesh and blood" and one legal person, or "legal fiction" (the "strawman") and that one's debts and legal obligations only apply to said strawman. By separating from one's strawman through certain procedures it is possible to become free from all liabilities and legal constraints. Elvick was imprisoned again in 2005. The strawman theory eventually became one of the most successful pseudolegal concepts and a core belief of the redemption movement originated by Elvick, as well as of the sovereign citizen movement. Elvick's ideas went on to influence the Canadian "Detaxer" and freeman on the land movements in Canada.

=== Bonita Lynne Meredith ===
Bonita Lynne Meredith, also known as Lynne Meredith, Lynne Meridith, Lynn Meridith and Lynn Meredith, was sentenced in June 2005 to ten years and one month in prison for conspiracy, four counts of mail fraud, two counts of using a false social security number, making a false statement in a passport application, and five counts of failing to file a tax return. In its press release following the sentencing of Meredith, the Department of Justice stated: "The evidence presented during a 13-week trial showed that beginning in 1991 and continuing until April 2002, Meredith conducted seminars at which she sold books and bogus 'pure trusts' to people with the purpose of leading them to believe they could legally shield income and assets from taxation. She owned and operated various businesses, including We the People (WTP), Free the People, Sovereignty Pure Trusts, and Liberty International. She wrote two books, "How to Cook a Vulture" and "Vultures in Eagle's Clothing". The books instructed customers to falsely report to the IRS that they did not owe income taxes. Meredith and her co-defendants encouraged and assisted taxpayers by forming phony 'pure trusts,' opening bank accounts with phony Taxpayer Identification Numbers, filing fraudulent income tax returns and encouraging taxpayers to stop filing income tax returns." Four other persons convicted of conspiracy in connection with the activities of Meredith were also sentenced to prison. On June 26, 2012, the United States Court of Appeals for the Ninth Circuit affirmed her conviction and the sentence in the United States District Court for the Central District of California.

Meredith served time in Federal prison and was released from Federal custody on February 1, 2013 (one day earlier than originally scheduled).

=== Wayne C. Bentson ===
In May 2005, the IRS announced that Wayne C. Bentson was sentenced to four years in prison and three years of supervised release, and was ordered to pay the IRS over $1.1 million in restitution. In December 2004, Bentson was convicted on charges of conspiracy and willful failure to file his income tax returns. According to the U.S. Justice Department, Bentson told clients that he was a tax expert and falsely advised clients that the tax laws applied only to individuals living in the Virgin Islands, Guam, and Puerto Rico. According to the Justice Department, Bentson also falsely advised clients that they were not taxpayers, that they had not earned income, and that they were not required to pay federal income tax. Some witnesses reportedly testified during Bentson's trial that they also had been prosecuted after following Bentson's advice. Bentson was released from prison in May 2008.

=== Larken Rose ===
Larken Rose, an adherent of the 861 argument, was sentenced to 15 months in prison for willful failure to file income tax returns in five years in which the government alleged that his income was approximately $500,000. He was released from prison in December 2006. Rose wrote a 79-page discussion on his views, and sold a video entitled Theft by Deception. Tax blogger Walter Olson described his theory as "folk law", arguments that were developed from outside the legal profession. The arguments made by Wesley Snipes were based, in part upon his theory.

=== Charles Thomas Clayton ===
Charles Thomas (Tom) Clayton, M.D., regularly filed Federal income tax returns until he became involved with a "tax protest organization." For the year 1992, he failed to file a return. In October 1996 he pleaded guilty and was sentenced to one year of probation for failure to file the 1992 return.

Clayton filed tax returns for 1997 and 1998. On August 29, 2006, he was found guilty by a jury in Federal court in Austin, Texas, of two counts of willfully making false statements on some returns that he had filed, and six counts of willfully failing to file tax returns. According to The Courier of Montgomery County, "Clayton's defense at the trial centered on the '861 argument' -- a defense used numerous times in previous years, but never successfully [ . . . . ]" According to an April 7, 2006 Justice Department news release shortly after he was indicted, Clayton failed to file income tax returns for years 1999 through 2004 while receiving over $1.5 million in gross income. The government also charged that for years 1997 and 1998 Clayton filed false amended returns, claiming refunds of over $160,000. The conviction was upheld on appeal.

Criminal investigators of the Internal Revenue Service had gathered information on Clayton during the IRS investigation of Larken Rose (see above). According to the prosecutor's office, Clayton "disregarded multiple written notices from the Internal Revenue Service informing him that his 861 argument was without merit," and Clayton "had also been told the same thing by two Certified Public Accountants."

On December 15, 2006, Clayton was sentenced to five years in prison and a fine of $50,000, plus a requirement that he pay over $7,400 in prosecution costs. Clayton was incarcerated at the Federal Correctional Institution at Bastrop, Texas. As a result of his conviction, the Texas Medical Board revoked Clayton's license to practice medicine.

Clayton was released from federal prison in June 2011. Under the sentence, he was subject to supervision for one year following his prison term.

Clayton applied to have his Texas physician's license re-instated, but the Texas Medical Board denied the application in February 2015.

=== Wesley Snipes ===
On February 1, 2008, actor Wesley Snipes was found guilty on three misdemeanor counts of failing to file Federal income tax returns. He was acquitted on one felony count of conspiracy to defraud the government and one felony count of filing a false claim with the government. The allegations against Snipes had included charges that he filed a false amended return including a false tax refund claim of over US$4 million for the year 1996 and a false amended return including a false tax refund claim of over US$7.3 million for the year 1997, using the "861 argument." The indictment said Snipes used accountants who already had a history of filing false returns to obtain refund payments for their clients. On April 24, 2008, Snipes was sentenced to three years in prison. He was released to home confinement on April 2, 2013.

=== William J. Benson ===
William J. Benson, the co-author of the book The Law that Never Was (in which Benson had argued that the Sixteenth Amendment was not properly ratified), was convicted of tax evasion and willful failure to file tax returns in connection with over $100,000 of unreported income, and his conviction was upheld on appeal. He was sentenced to four years in prison and five years of probation. See United States v. Benson. Benson's "Sixteenth Amendment was not properly ratified" argument was rejected. On December 17, 2007, the United States District Court for the Northern District of Illinois ruled that Benson's "Reliance Defense Package" (including Benson's Sixteenth Amendment non-ratification argument), constituted a "fraud perpetrated by Benson" that had "caused needless confusion and a waste of the customers' and the IRS' time and resources."

=== Robert B. Clarkson ===
Robert B. Clarkson was indicted in 1994 for conspiracy to impede, impair, obstruct and defeat the functions of the Internal Revenue Service under 18 U.S.C. § 371. Clarkson gave seminars in which he asserted that it was legal to claim false exemptions, to hide income, and to refuse to file income tax returns or pay income tax. He and two associates were convicted, and the convictions were upheld on appeal. He was sentenced to 57 months in prison, and was released in 1999. Clarkson died on March 1, 2010.

=== Richard M. Simkanin ===
Richard Michael Simkanin was a tax protester who became involved with the We the People Foundation and espoused the "income taxes are voluntary" argument. He served a seven-year sentence for convictions on ten counts of willfully failing to collect and pay over employment taxes under 26 U.S.C. § 7202, fifteen counts of knowingly making and presenting false, fictitious or fraudulent claims for refund of employment taxes under 18 U.S.C. § 287 and 18 U.S.C. § 2, and four counts of willfully failing to timely file federal income tax returns under 26 U.S.C. § 7203. Five days after his release from prison, he was sent back to jail pending a hearing regarding alleged violations of the terms of his release. On July 2, 2010, his terms of release were revoked, and the Court sentenced him to an additional six years and seven months in prison. Simkanin died while serving his prison sentence in late 2010, at the age of sixty-seven.

=== Arthur Farnsworth ===
Arthur Farnsworth (born 1962) is a convicted tax protester. Evidence found by the government in Farnsworth's case helped the government indict actor Wesley Snipes on tax charges.

=== Kent Hovind ===
In November 2006, Christian fundamentalist public speaker Kent Hovind was convicted of twelve counts of willful failure to collect, account for, and pay over Federal income taxes and FICA taxes under 26 U.S.C. § 7202, forty-five counts of knowingly structuring transactions in Federally-insured financial institutions to evade the reporting requirements of 31 U.S.C. § 5313(a), in violation of 31 U.S.C. § 5324, 18 U.S.C. § 2 and 31 C.F.R. sec. 103.11, and one count of corruptly endeavoring to obstruct and impede the administration of the internal revenue laws under 26 U.S.C. § 7212. Twelve of the charges were for failing to pay employee-related taxes, totaling $473,818, and 45 of the charges were for evading reporting requirements by making multiple cash withdrawals just under the $10,000 reporting requirement (smurfing).

Hovind had argued that he was not liable for taxes that and his ministry did not have to pay taxes because his workers were "missionaries", not "employees". In previous dealings with the IRS, Hovind had asserted tax protester arguments including the "income taxes are voluntary" argument.

The government charged that Hovind falsely listed the Internal Revenue Service as his only creditor in a bankruptcy case, and that Hovind filed a false and frivolous lawsuit against the IRS in which he demanded damages for criminal trespass, made threats of harm to those investigating him and to those who might consider cooperating with the investigation, filed a false complaint against IRS agents investigating him, filed a false criminal complaint against IRS special agents (criminal investigators), and destroyed records.

Former and current workers, IRS agents, a bank employee, and a lawyer of a non-profit Christian organization testified in the trial. Workers testified that they had to punch time cards, had vacation and sick days; while others testified Hovind claimed he had "beat" the tax system.

On January 19, 2007, Hovind was sentenced to ten years in prison and three years of probation, and was ordered to pay the federal government restitution of over $600,000. Hovind was released from prison on August 7, 2015.

=== Edward Lewis Brown and Elaine A. Brown ===
Tax protesters Edward Lewis Brown and his wife Elaine A. Brown believed the IRS and the federal income tax to be "part of a deliberate plot perpetrated by Freemasons to control the American people and eventually the world." On January 18, 2007, Edward Lewis Brown, an ex-convict who previously served prison time for assault and armed robbery, was found guilty by a jury in a Federal District Court in Concord, New Hampshire of one count of conspiracy to defraud the United States under 18 U.S.C. § 371, one count of conspiracy to structure financial transactions to evade the Treasury reporting requirements in violation of 18 U.S.C. § 371, 31 U.S.C. § 5325 and 31 U.S.C. § 5324(a)(3), and one count of structuring financial transactions to evade the Treasury reporting requirements and aiding and abetting under 31 U.S.C. § 5324(a)(3) and 18 U.S.C. § 2. On that day the same jury found Elaine A. Brown guilty one count of conspiracy to defraud the United States under 18 U.S.C. § 371, five counts of tax evasion and aiding and abetting under 26 U.S.C. § 7201 and 18 U.S.C. § 2, eight counts of willful failure to collect employment taxes under 26 U.S.C. § 7202 and aiding and abetting under 18 U.S.C. § 2, one count of conspiracy to structure financial transactions to evade the Treasury reporting requirements in violation of 18 U.S.C. § 371, 31 U.S.C. § 5325 and 31 U.S.C. § 5324(a)(3), and two counts of structuring financial transactions to evade the Treasury reporting requirements and aiding and abetting under 31 U.S.C. § 5324(a)(3) and 18 U.S.C. § 2.

The Browns stated that they had not been presented with any statute or law that required them to pay income taxes (see Tax protester statutory arguments). The tax evasion convictions of Mrs. Brown involved the failure to report income of $1,310,706 over a period of five years. On April 24, 2007, Ed and Elaine Brown were sentenced to five years and three months in prison each. After a long standoff at their New Hampshire residence, the Browns were arrested by Federal law enforcement authorities on October 4, 2007, and began serving their prison sentences.

=== Andrew Joseph Stack III ===
Andrew Joseph Stack III was a computer programmer who on February 18, 2010 set fire to his own house, drove to a local airport, then flew a Piper Dakota into a local IRS field office in Austin Texas. Stack had been in tax disputes with the IRS since the 1980s, including his involvement in a scheme to call himself a member of clergy for tax purposes, and was being audited at the time of his death. He posted an online "manifesto" expressing his anger at the government for his financial problems. His arguments in the manifesto, combined with his activities, indicate a mixture of tax resistance arguments, tax protest, and a more general belief that the US government had forfeited its legitimacy by failing to address his complaints. Nonetheless, he directed this anger specifically toward the IRS and wrote in anticipation that others would follow him.

Stack and an IRS employee were killed and 13 people were injured. The IRS said there was no direct budgetary impact as a result of the attack on the IRS's ability to provide taxpayer services or enforce tax laws .

=== Sean David Morton ===
Sean David Morton, a self-proclaimed psychic, conducted workshops in which he promoted means to "wipe out" tax bills and other financial liabilities. Through the use of fraudulent tax returns which the Internal Revenue Service had insufficiently cross-checked, he managed to get for himself and his wife an undue $480,322.55 tax refund. In 2017, he was sentenced to six years in prison and to return the money to the IRS. His wife was also sentenced to prison.

=== Winston Shrout ===
Winston Shrout, a sovereign citizen "guru", advocated redemption schemes which he marketed under the name "Solutions in Commerce" He did not file tax returns for about 20 years and issued for himself and others hundreds of fake "Bills of exchange" which he sent notably to the IRS. In 2018, he was sentenced to ten years in prison on various counts of tax evasion and producing fictitious financial instruments. Several of his associates, including his daughter, were also sentenced.

== See also ==
- Frivolous litigation
- Potentially dangerous taxpayer
- Tax choice
- Tax resistance
- Tax protester constitutional arguments
- Tax protester Sixteenth Amendment arguments
