= We the People Foundation =

Non-profit education and research organization

Coordinates: 43.4606°N 73.6214°W

We the People Foundation for Constitutional Education, Inc. also known as We the People Foundation is a non-profit education and research organization in Queensbury, New York with the declared mission "to protect and defend individual Rights as guaranteed by the Constitutions of the United States." It was founded by Robert L. Schulz. At the U.S. Department of Justice, he is known as a "high-profile tax protester". The Southern Poverty Law Center asserts that Schulz is the head of the leading organization in the tax protester movement. The organization formally served a petition for redress of grievances regarding income tax upon the United States government in November 2002. In July 2004, it filed a lawsuit in an unsuccessful attempt to force the government to address the petition (see below). The organization has also served petitions relating to other issues since then.

== National Clean Elections Lawsuit ==
In 2007, Robert Schulz filed a federal lawsuit, with plaintiffs in all 50 states, claiming that electronic voting machines were inefficient means of counting citizens' votes, and calling for hand counts of paper ballots nationwide. The "National Clean Elections Lawsuit" was filed in federal court in New York in September 2007, and was served in all 50 states in early November 2007.

The Constitution Party noted that several of its state chairs were plaintiffs in the lawsuit.

The District Court ultimately ruled against Schulz and the other plaintiffs, concluding that Schulz and his other litigators lacked standing to maintain the lawsuit.

== Tax cases ==
We the People Foundation and Robert L. Schulz have been the subject of federal investigations, and they have been directly and indirectly involved in various court cases regarding federal income taxation.

=== Tax protester arguments promoted by the Foundation ===
In a case involving Richard Michael Simkanin, a tax protester who supported the Foundation and who died while serving a prison sentence for Federal tax offenses, the United States Court of Appeals for the Fifth Circuit has stated that the We the People Foundation ("WTP"):

promotes the view that, despite common misconceptions, there is actually no law that requires most Americans to pay income taxes or most companies to withhold taxes from employees' paychecks. WTP also espouses the view that the Sixteenth Amendment was fraudulently declared to have been ratified.

=== IRS investigation ===
In one case, Robert L. Schulz filed motions in a federal court to quash administrative summonses issued by the Internal Revenue Service (IRS) seeking testimony and documents in connection with an IRS investigation. The United States Court of Appeals for the Second Circuit affirmed the dismissal of the taxpayer's motions for a lack of subject matter jurisdiction because there was no actual case or controversy as required by Article III of the Constitution. The court reasoned that the summonses posed no threat of injury to the taxpayer, as the IRS had not yet initiated enforcement proceedings against him. The taxpayer was not entitled to a court order to quash the summonses until the IRS went to court to demand that he comply with the summons or otherwise face sanctions—something the IRS had not yet done.

A subsequent attempt by Schulz to obtain a court order quashing an IRS "third party" summons issued to the internet payment service known as PayPal was rejected by a Federal court in Nebraska in June 2006. The summons was issued to PayPal to obtain information about donations to (or purchases made at) an internet web site maintained by Schulz or We the People Foundation. The court record indicates that the IRS issued the summons to PayPal as part of an investigation of an alleged failure by Schulz to file Federal income tax returns for the years 2001 through 2004, after Schulz refused to cooperate with the IRS inquiry. Schulz lost this case on appeal on September 13, 2007. In this case, the United States Court of Appeals for the Eighth Circuit ruled: "Schulz's constitutional arguments challenging the IRS's authority to enforce the tax laws are without merit." On April 27, 2007, an appeal by Schulz in a similar case (from a Federal district court in California) to try to block an IRS summons was rejected by the United States Court of Appeals for the Ninth Circuit.

=== Lawsuit over right to petition in connection with federal taxes ===
In a separate case, Schulz and his We the People Foundation organization argued unsuccessfully that, based on the First Amendment right of the people to petition the government for a redress of grievances, the government should have a duty to respond to a taxpayer's demand for an explanation as to why taxpayers are subject to income tax. On May 8, 2007, the argument was rejected by the United States Court of Appeals for the District of Columbia Circuit in We the People Foundation, Inc. v. United States. The Foundation appealed to the United States Supreme Court and, on January 7, 2008, the Supreme Court declined to accept the case.

=== Permanent injunction halting certain Foundation activities ===
On April 3, 2007, the U.S. Department of Justice announced that it had sued Schulz and two organizations, We the People Foundation for Constitutional Education Inc., and We the People Congress Inc., in connection with an attempt to stop the sale of an alleged tax fraud scheme reported to have cost the U.S. Treasury more than 21 million dollars. The suit alleged that Schulz had "used the two We the People entities to market a nationwide tax fraud scheme, called the Tax Termination Package, to employers and employees." The government charged that "the Tax Termination Package includes We the People forms, which the defendants falsely tell customers can be used to replace forms the IRS requires employers and employees must use in connection with federal tax withholding from wages."

On August 9, 2007, the United States District Court for the Northern District of New York ruled that some the Foundation's activities constituted the promotion of an illegal tax shelter by means of a statement or statements that the promoter "knows or has reason to known is false or fraudulent as to any material matter" under Internal Revenue Code section 6700 (26 U.S.C. § 6700), and that a court order prohibiting those activities under 26 U.S.C. § 7408 was appropriate. The court issued an order including an injunction permanently barring Schulz and his We the People Foundation from (1) advising or instructing persons or entities that they are not required to file federal tax returns or pay federal taxes (see Tax protester arguments); (2) selling or furnishing any materials purporting to enable individuals to discontinue or stop withholding or paying federal taxes; (3) instructing, advising or assisting anyone to stop withholding or stop paying federal employment or income taxes; and (4) obstructing or advising anyone to obstruct IRS examinations, collections, or other IRS proceedings. On or about August 29, 2007, much of the material on the We the People web sites was removed pursuant to the court order, a copy of which was posted on the web sites.

The court "also ordered that the names, addresses, telephone numbers, e-mail addresses and Social Security numbers of every person who received materials on how to stop paying taxes be turned over to the government." According to the New York Times, "[t]his information would make it easy for the Internal Revenue Service to identify people who followed the illegal advice and for the Justice Department to prosecute them for tax crimes."

On February 22, 2008, the United States Court of Appeals for the Second Circuit affirmed the judgment of the District Court. The Court of Appeals stated:

Defendants principally argue that the tax materials at issue constitute protected political and/or educational speech under the First Amendment of the Constitution. Defendants further argue that their actions in promoting the materials are otherwise protected under the First Amendment's Petition Clause, on the theory that the government has yet to respond to defendants' repeated inquiries as to whether, and on what basis, any information in the tax materials is false. [ . . . ] We have considered all of defendants' arguments and find them to be without merit.

The Court of Appeals also reinstated the District Court's requirement that the Foundation must provide the government "the names and contact information of the individuals who have received the tax materials." The Court of Appeals stated:

The district court found that defendants' illegal activities were harming individuals, who were exposing themselves to criminal liability by following the defendants' ill-conceived instructions. [ . . . ] Requiring defendants to provide the identity and contact information of the recipients of the tax materials enables the government to monitor the defendants' obligation under the injunction to provide a copy of the district court's order to recipients of the tax materials. Moreover, the district court found that the defendants' illegal actions were harming the government [ . . . ] Requiring defendants to provide the identity and contact information [ . . . ] enables the government to monitor whether the recipients of defendants' materials are violating the tax laws. Thus, we find no abuse of discretion with respect to the district court's imposition of the reporting requirements in Paragraph C of the injunction.

=== Contempt proceeding ===
On April 7, 2008, the government filed a motion in the United States District Court for the Northern District of New York, asking the court to hold Robert L. Schulz and the We the People Foundation in civil contempt of court for failure to comply with the court order requiring Schulz to turn over, to the government, the names and contact information of the individuals who have received tax materials from the Foundation. On April 28, 2008, the District Court issued an order holding We the People Foundation and the other defendants in contempt of court, imposing fines of $2,000 per day on Robert Schulz, the We the People Foundation, and We the People Congress, effective retroactively to April 28, 2008, if the defendants did not comply with the court order by 4:00 p.m. on Monday, May 5, 2008. At 3:55 pm on May 5, 2008, Schulz filed a document with the court asserting that he had turned the material over to the United States attorney's office earlier that day.

== Disputing President Obama's citizenship ==
We The People Foundation placed a full-page advertisement in the December 1 and 3, 2008 editions of the Chicago Tribune newspaper in the form of an open letter addressed to Barack Obama's presidential transition office in Chicago, in which the Foundation disputed Obama's status as a "natural born citizen" of the United States. The letter asserts that Obama cannot assume the office of President, and that the state electors cannot vote for his candidacy, unless Obama provides "documentary evidence before December 15, that conclusively establishes his eligibility". The letter lists specific documents that, in the opinion of the letter's author, Robert L. Schulz, are missing or have not been made available. The letter states that the attempts to obtain the demanded evidence were unsuccessful "in a number of recent lawsuits". The group had previously said: "We make no claim regarding Mr. Obama, other than he has refused to provide proof of his eligibility to hold the office of the President of the United States, as he is required to do by the Constitution." On December 3, 2008. the same day as the second ad ran, the Tribune also ran a response examining the allegations the Foundation made.

== Revocation of tax-exempt status ==
As of March 8, 2010, the Foundation reported on its web site that the Internal Revenue Service revoked the Foundation's tax exempt status for federal income tax purposes, and that the Foundation intended to contest the revocation in court. The Foundation stated that it was officially notified of the revocation on January 27, 2010, and that the revocation was effective retroactively to the year 2003. The report also stated that the IRS was preparing to execute levies against the Foundation for alleged tax deficiencies stemming from the revocation of tax exempt status. In a statement on January 29, 2011, the Foundation indicated on its web site that it was contesting the revocation in the U.S. Tax Court. The records of the U.S. Tax Court show that the Foundation filed its petition on September 21, 2010, and that the related entity, We The People Congress, Inc., also filed a petition on that same date. On October 31, 2013, the United States Tax Court ruled that the Internal Revenue Service could "proceed with the various collection actions" against the Foundation and its related entity, the We The People Congress, Inc.

== See also ==
- Tax protester arguments
- Tax protester constitutional arguments
- Tax protester statutory arguments
- Tax protester history
