= Antideficiency Act =

Act of United States Congress

Antideficiency Act Amendments of 1982
- Long title: An Act to revise, codify, and enact without substantive change certain general and permanent laws, related to money and finance, as title 31, United States Code, "Money and Finance".
- Nicknames: Money and Finance Enactment as title 31, United States Code
- Enacted by: the 97th United States Congress
- Effective: September 13, 1982

Citations
- Public law: 97–258
- Statutes at Large: 96 Stat. 877

Codification
- Titles amended: 31 U.S.C.: Money and Finance
- U.S.C. sections amended: 31 U.S.C. ch. 1 §§ 101–103; 31 U.S.C. ch. 3 §§ 301–309, 321–331; 31 U.S.C. ch. 5 §§ 501–503, 521–522; 31 U.S.C. ch. 7 §§ 701–704, 711–720, 731–736, 751–755, 771–779; 31 U.S.C. ch. 11 §§ 1101–1114; 31 U.S.C. ch. 13 §§ 1301–1310, 1321–1324, 1341–1351; 31 U.S.C. ch. 15 §§ 1501–1503, 1511–1519, 1531–1537, 1551–1557; 31 U.S.C. ch. 31 §§ 3101–3113, 3121–3129; 31 U.S.C. ch. 33 §§ 3301–3305, 3321–3333, 3341–3343; 31 U.S.C. ch. 35 §§ 3501, 3511–3514, 3521–3532, 3541–3545; 31 U.S.C. ch. 37 §§ 3701–3702, 3711–3715, 3721–3731; 31 U.S.C. ch. 51 §§ 5101–5103, 5111–5122, 5131–5133, 5141–5144, 5151–5155; 31 U.S.C. ch. 53 §§ 5301–5304, 5311–5322; 31 U.S.C. ch. 61 §§ 6101–6105; 31 U.S.C. ch. 63 §§ 6301–6308; 31 U.S.C. ch. 65 §§ 6501–6508; 31 U.S.C. ch. 67 §§ 6701–6724; 31 U.S.C. ch. 69 §§ 6901–6906; 31 U.S.C. ch. 71 §§ 7101–7112; 31 U.S.C. ch. 73 §§ 7301–7305; 31 U.S.C. ch. 91 §§ 9101–9109; 31 U.S.C. ch. 93 §§ 9301–9309; 31 U.S.C. ch. 95 §§ 9501–9504; 31 U.S.C. ch. 97 §§ 9701–9702

Legislative history
- Introduced in the House as H.R. 6128 by Peter W. Rodino (D-NJ) on April 21, 1982; Committee consideration by House Judiciary, Senate Judiciary; Passed the House on August 9, 1982 (passed voice vote); Passed the Senate Committee on Judiciary on August 20, 1982 (unanimous consent) with amendment; Senate agreed to Senate Committee on Judiciary amendment on August 20, 1982 (passed voice vote); Signed into law by President Ronald Reagan on September 13, 1982

The Antideficiency Act (ADA) (Pub. L. 97–258, 96 Stat. 923) is legislation enacted by the United States Congress to prevent the incurring of obligations or the making of expenditures (outlays) in excess of amounts available in appropriations or funds. The law was initially enacted in 1884, with major amendments occurring in 1950 (64 Stat. 765) and 1982 (96 Stat. 923). It is now codified at 31 U.S.C. § 1341, § 1342, §§ 1349–1351 and §§ 1511–1519. The Act was previously enacted as section 3679 of the Revised Statutes.

The ADA prohibits the U.S. federal government from entering into a contract that is not "fully funded" because doing so would obligate the government in the absence of an appropriation adequate to the needs of the contract. Accordingly, it is often cited during U.S. government shutdowns as a reason for the closure of certain departments or facilities.

== Provisions ==
The Antideficiency Act has evolved over time in response to various abuses. The earliest version of the legislation was enacted in 1870 (16 Stat. 251), after the Civil War, to end the executive branch's long history of creating coercive deficiencies. Many agencies, particularly the military, would intentionally run out of money, obligating Congress to provide additional funds to avoid breaching contracts. Some went as far as to spend their entire budget in the first few months of the fiscal year, funding the rest of the year after the fact with additional appropriations from Congress. The act provided:

... that it shall not be lawful for any department of the government to expend in any one fiscal year any sum in excess of appropriations made by Congress for that fiscal year, or to involve the government in any contract for the future payment of money in excess of such appropriations.

Amendments in 1905 and 1906 mandated all appropriations to be apportioned in monthly installments; they also imposed criminal penalties for violations.

The Antideficiency Act actually includes provisions of Title 31 that are not always associated with the principal provision of the Act which is found at 31 USC 1341. Thus, the ADA also includes 31 USC 1342, a provision which prohibits voluntary services. It also includes 31 USC 1501–1519, provisions which require that appropriated funds be subdivided, "apportioned", and "allocated" before any of the appropriated funds can be expended by the Executive Branch.

== Legislative history ==
The earliest version of the legislation was enacted in 1870 (16 Stat. 251). The Antideficiency Act (Pub. L. 97–258, 96 Stat. 923) was initially enacted in 1884.

The Act was amended and expanded several times, most significantly in 1905 and 1906. It was further modified by an executive order in 1933 and significantly revamped in 1950 (64 Stat. 765). The current version was enacted on September 12, 1982 (96 Stat. 923). It is now codified at 31 U.S.C. § 1341.

== Constitutional authority ==
To some extent, but not entirely, it implements the provisions of Article One of the United States Constitution, Section 9, Clause 7 (the "power of the purse"), which provides that "No money shall be drawn from the treasury, but in consequence of appropriations made by law."

== Enforcement ==
The Government Accountability Office, inspectors general, and individual agencies investigate potential violations of the Antideficiency Act every year. The act has ramifications for agencies and individual employees alike.

Although the ADA and its predecessors are over 120 years old, no one has ever been convicted or indicted for its violation. However, agreements have been changed and reported due to ADA violations, and punitive administrative actions are routinely taken against government employees.

The ADA is cited as the reason for a government shutdown when Congress misses a deadline for passing an interim or full-year appropriations bill.

== See also ==
- Taxing and Spending Clause
- Government procurement in the United States
- Impoundment of appropriated funds
- Government shutdowns in the United States
