= Edward and Elaine Brown =

American tax protesters

Edward Lewis Brown (born 1942) and his wife, Elaine Alice Brown (born c. 1940), residents of the state of New Hampshire, gained national news media attention as tax protesters in early 2007 for refusing to pay the U.S. federal income tax and subsequently refusing to surrender to federal government agents after having been convicted of tax crimes.

After the conviction and sentencing, a long, armed standoff with federal law enforcement authorities at their New Hampshire residence ended with the arrest of Edward and Elaine Brown on October 4, 2007. In July 2009, while serving their sentences for the tax crimes, the Browns were found guilty by a federal district court jury of additional criminal charges arising from their conduct during the standoff.

The Browns have been identified by the Federal Bureau of Investigation (FBI) as members of the sovereign citizen movement.

== Elaine Brown ==
Elaine Brown attended dental school at Tufts University in Boston before opening a dental practice in West Lebanon, New Hampshire. Elaine Brown earned most of the couple's income that was involved in the tax dispute through her dental practice.

== Edward Brown ==
Edward Brown is retired from the pest control business.

=== Earlier felony convictions and pardon ===
In 1960, Edward Brown was found guilty of assault with a dangerous weapon and armed robbery in connection with an attack on a man in Somerville, Massachusetts. Brown was imprisoned at the Massachusetts Correctional Institute in Concord, Massachusetts, was paroled in January 1965, and was pardoned in July 1976 by then-governor Michael Dukakis, with the recommendation of the Massachusetts Advisory Board of Parole.

=== Involvement in militia movement ===
According to an October 1994 article in the New Hampshire Sunday News, Edward Brown was the spokesman for an organization called the Constitution Defense Militia and had become involved in the militia movement in late 1993. The newspaper reported that Brown designated various individuals and organizations as being part of a conspiracy to deprive Americans of life and liberty. Among the people and organizations named by Brown were then-U.S. President Bill Clinton, former President George H. W. Bush, Mikhail Gorbachev, The Council on Foreign Relations, the United Nations, the Trilateral Commission, the American Bar Association, and the Federal Emergency Management Agency (FEMA).

Brown reportedly had stockpiled 18 months' worth of food, with weapons and ammunition, and believed that there would be a Federal government takeover of "private property, utilities, health facilities and the media." The 1994 article reported that Brown believed the militia was setting up its own "courts… for the purpose of taking back America." The newspaper reported that Brown said he saw no way the conflict would end except in violence. The paper stated: "Brown, who says he is an agnostic, admits it's easy to dismiss him as a nut."

== Tax-related indictment, trial and convictions ==
In April 2006, Edward and Elaine Brown were indicted in the United States District Court in New Hampshire for numerous federal tax violations.

Prosecutors in the Browns' case presented evidence that the Browns had not paid income tax since 1996 and had not filed income tax returns since 1998; they were liable for taxes of more than $625,000.

The Browns initially chose to represent themselves, without the help of a court-appointed lawyer. Halfway through the trial Edward Brown decided not to return to the court, while Elaine Brown chose to enlist the help of a court-appointed lawyer to defend her and negotiate any possible plea bargain offered by the federal prosecutor.

The Browns claimed they had not been presented with any law that required them to pay income taxes to the federal government, an argument similar to many tax protester statutory arguments.

On January 18, 2007, Edward Brown was found guilty by a jury in a Federal District Court in Concord, New Hampshire of one count of conspiracy to defraud the United States under 18 U.S.C. § 371, one count of conspiracy to structure financial transactions to evade the Treasury reporting requirements in violation of 18 U.S.C. § 371, 31 U.S.C. § 5325 and 31 U.S.C. § 5324(a)(3), and one count of structuring financial transactions to evade the Treasury reporting requirements and aiding and abetting under 31 U.S.C. § 5324(a)(3) and 18 U.S.C. § 2. Elaine Brown was convicted of one count of conspiracy to defraud the United States under 18 U.S.C. § 371, five counts of tax evasion and aiding and abetting under 26 U.S.C. § 7201 and 18 U.S.C. § 2, eight counts of willful failure to collect employment taxes under 26 U.S.C. § 7202 and aiding and abetting under 18 U.S.C. § 2, one count of conspiracy to structure financial transactions to evade the Treasury reporting requirements in violation of 18 U.S.C. § 371, 31 U.S.C. § 5325 and 31 U.S.C. § 5324(a)(3), and two counts of structuring financial transactions to evade the Treasury reporting requirements and aiding and abetting under 31 U.S.C. § 5324(a)(3) and 18 U.S.C. § 2. The tax evasion convictions of Elaine Brown involved the failure to report income of $1,310,706 over a period of five years. Each was sentenced to over five years in prison.

Before granting Elaine Brown's release on bail, the judge of the Browns' trial ordered her not to return to the Browns' home before sentencing. As a condition of her bail agreement with the state, she was ordered to live at her son's home in Worcester, Massachusetts, where she had been living prior to the trial. A tracking device was attached to her, and she was given permission to leave her son's home only if he was accompanying her; she later violated the terms of her release by destroying this device and rejoining her husband.

On April 14, 2007, the Concord Monitor reported that Edward and Elaine Brown "recently ordered the clerk of the court to close their case, citing themselves as 'the court' and 'judge'." The Browns reportedly signed their filings with the court using new names: "Edward, a Living Soul in the Body of the Lord, of the House of Israel," and "Elaine, a Living Soul in the Body of the Lord, of the House of Israel." The court rejected the filings, ruling them frivolous.

== Browns' residence ==
Edward Brown said that he had a stock of food and supplies and that his home could run on wind and solar generators even if cut off from the main grid. He also stated publicly that he did not intend to go to jail and "vowed to resist arrest violently and die rather than go to prison."

During the standoff, a number of supporters were camped outside his home and were encouraged to record any attempt to take Brown from his house. This policy of opening the door to supporters led to the successful arrest of the couple by United States Deputy Marshals who disguised themselves as supporters.

The 100 acre property at 401 Center of Town Road, Plainfield, New Hampshire was scheduled to be auctioned off in Concord, New Hampshire, on August 15, 2014, by U.S. Marshals, although no one bid at the auction. The Browns implied in interviews that the woods around the house had explosive "booby-traps." Federal officials therefore would not let interested bidders tour the property. In October 2015, however, would-be buyers were allowed to visit the property with an Internal Revenue Service official, and the property sold for $205,000 at auction on October 22, 2015.

== Beliefs about religion, Zionism, Judaism, Freemasonry and taxes ==
The Concord Monitor wrote: "The Browns changed their names in late March [2007] after converting to a non-denominational form of Christianity they learned from a man named Sonny. According to friends of the Browns, Sonny, who wears a long beard, all-white attire and sandals, flew from Hawaii to New Hampshire to visit the Browns and shared his religious and legal teachings over several days." Elaine Brown was quoted as saying: "The only law book we now recognize is the Bible. The only way we're coming out of our home is either as free man and free woman or in body bags."

The Browns alleged that they were not United States citizens, that they were non-residents of the United States for tax purposes, that the New Hampshire business tax laws were incorrect, null and void, and that labor could not be taxed. According to a New Hampshire newspaper, the Browns had not paid some state taxes, and "face a state tax lien for business profit taxes" of $343,000. The paper reported that with penalties and accumulated interest, the combined federal and state tax amount owed by Edward and Elaine Brown was over three million dollars.

In mid-July 2007, Edward Brown also announced that he would stop paying school and town property taxes to the town of Plainfield, New Hampshire. A local newspaper quoted Brown as saying: "They don't provide me any services, I'm not going to contribute to them anymore."

The Concord Monitor reported that property tax bills were mailed to residents of Plainfield on June 1, 2007, with return envelopes. The Monitor stated that when an employee of the town of Plainfield opened the return envelope from the Browns, no check for the Browns' property taxes was included. Instead, the Browns included a note with the following statement:

Nay! Nay! The land… at 401 Center of Town Road, Plainfield, New Hampshire [the Browns' residence], and all that is in and upon it, including the Lords bodies, are in the kingdom of heaven, belonging to the Lord, have been claimed by him, and thus can be claimed by no man, nor can any man have beneficial interest in it… Stand down and away from the Lords land and the bodies of the Lord. So it is written. So it is done.

Edward Brown was also quoted as having made comments about law enforcement officials and the judge in his case:

I wouldn't want to be this U.S. attorney. I wouldn't want to be this judge or these other people. This James John or anybody else that decides to come down here. Their names are already out there… They are just as vulnerable as I am. And if they're so foolish and stupid to think that they're not, hey, doom on them.

Edward Brown was reported to have stated in a radio interview in March 2007, in comments about federal authorities who were unwilling to see Brown's righteousness:

Once you've used the lawful word, you've done it the absolute proper way, and they still come at you, they are now attacking the Creator himself or itself,… You kill them. That is exactly what the Ten Commandments tell you to do.

In early June 2007 Brown claimed that the law enforcement officials surrounding his properties were part of a "Zionist, Illuminati, Freemason movement," and that the federal government had no jurisdiction in New Hampshire. Referring to the warrants and court orders against him, Brown said "This is just paper… This is fiction. The entire American government is fiction. We created it, didn't we?" The New Hampshire Union Leader also reported that "the Browns believe the IRS and the federal income tax are part of a deliberate plot perpetrated by Freemasons to control the American people and eventually the world."

In an interview on February 2, 2007, on the radio show "Constitution for the Defense," Edward Brown was quoted as saying:

This is the beginning of one very huge movement. I'm not quite sure you understand the ramifications of what's going on right now. This is massive. This is international. We are fed up with the Zionist Illuminati. That's what this is all about. Loud and clear. Zionist Illuminati. Lawyers, whatever they are, okay, it's going to stop. And if the judge is a member of that, I know that McAuliffe [i.e., Steven J. McAuliffe, the federal judge in Brown's tax case] is, I know that U.S. Attorney Colantuono is, they'd better stop. This is a warning. You can do whatever you want to me. My job is to get the message out, and I'm getting the message out, and I'm warning you guys - not you guys [referring to the radio show hosts], them - to cease and desist their unlawful activity in this country and every other country because once this thing starts, we're going to seek them out and hunt them down. And we're going to bring them to justice. So anybody wishes to join them, you go right ahead and join them. But I promise you, long after I'm gone, they're going to seek out every one of you and your bloodline.

On August 10, 2007, the New Hampshire Union Leader reported that Edward Brown said that a war was spreading and becoming an uprising against the federal government, eventually to develop into a revolution, and that the war would come within eighteen months. The Union Leader quoted Brown:

"It has never, ever been resolved without war!" an infuriated Brown shouted during an interview on his porch Wednesday [August 8, 2007]. If federal agents storm Brown's property, he and his supporters will come out shooting. Brown said yesterday [August 9, 2007] that if those agents kill him or his wife, Elaine, his supporters will systematically find and kill Plainfield Police Chief Gordon Gillens, Sullivan County Sheriff Michael Prozzo and others Brown says are sworn to protect him.

According to the New Hampshire Union Leader:

He [Ed Brown] points his finger at Freemasons, Zionist Jews and what he says is a secret society known as the Illuminati. Brown said his extensive research shows these groups are all working together in a global conspiracy. "We're not conspiracy theorists," Brown said, settling into a chair on his unfinished concrete porch. "We deal with conspiracy facts. Freemasonry and Judaism—that is the truth. That is the fact. That is where all the world's problems come from… I know for a fact that they're working together."

== Chronology of post-trial events; the standoff ==
=== February 2007 ===
- On February 1, Ed Brown publishes an open letter restating his arguments against the government and pleading with supporters to come to his home to aid in his defense against the government.
- On February 13, prosecutors ask a court to seize the Browns' property.
- On February 20, Elaine Brown returns to her home in order to be with her husband.
- On February 22, ruling her actions a violation of her bail agreement, a federal judge issues a warrant for Elaine Brown's arrest.

=== March 2007 ===
- On March 2, a federal judge signs an order for the Browns to pay $216,000 to the government or else face the seizure of their property, including their home. The order is to become final at their sentencing in April.

=== April 2007 ===
- On April 24, U.S. District Judge Steven McAuliffe sentences Ed and Elaine Brown to five years and three months in prison each for concealing earnings and failing to pay federal income tax on nearly $2 million of income. Neither of the Browns appeared in court for the sentencing.
- On April 26, Judge McAuliffe issues an order that the notices of appeal filed by the Browns on January 28 should be treated as having been filed on April 24 (the Browns' sentencing date) and that their initially premature notices of appeal would be treated as having been timely filed. The judge also orders that within thirty days, the Browns should either file the appellate fee ($455 each) or file a motion for leave to proceed in forma pauperis.

=== May 2007 ===
- On May 18, Ed and Elaine Brown stated that they did not intend to appeal their convictions on federal tax evasion charges. They said they have abandoned "man's law" and now follow only the rules and laws put forth in the Bible.

=== June 2007 ===
- On June 7, police, SWAT teams, and armored vehicles are seen gathering in a field near the Browns' home. United States Marshal Stephen Monier confirms that one Brown supporter was detained near the Browns' property. Several sources later identify the Browns' supporter as a man named Danny Riley, and state that he was detained while walking the Browns' dog, Zoe. Monier's office later releases a press statement indicating that the government agents were not raiding the Browns' home, but were in the area to serve a warrant for the seizure of Elaine Brown's dental office in West Lebanon, New Hampshire. (Subsequent testimony at trial revealed that this operation was in fact an arrest attempt.) In the evening of June 7, Riley records a video describing his encounter with and detainment by federal agents earlier that day. In the video Riley claims that one camouflaged agent fired two shots over his head after he fled from the agent once happening upon him hiding in the woods near the Browns' property. Riley claims that after being tackled and tasered, he was threatened with 15 years in jail by the FBI unless he told the media that the siege was expected and planned for, and was not the outcome of an abortive attempt to serve a warrant.
- On June 18, the Browns host a press conference at their home with Randy Weaver, whose wife and 14-year-old son had been killed by federal agents during a standoff in Ruby Ridge, Idaho, in 1992. Weaver voices his support for the Browns, and the Browns reiterate their intentions to avoid arrest by the government.

=== July 2007 ===
- On July 14, the Browns hosted a small concert at their Plainfield property. The concert was organized by the We The People Radio Network to "save the Browns", and drew an estimated crowd of 200 people. Dave Cahill, Poker Face, and others performed.
- On July 17, a Chevrolet Blazer sport utility vehicle (SUV) owned by Elaine Brown is seized by the United States marshal after the SUV is involved in a traffic accident in which a 17-year-old girl was injured and her Chrysler Concorde sedan totaled. The driver of the SUV was identified as Jason Gerhard of Brookhaven, New York. According to the girl's mother, Judy Dunham, Gerhard did not immediately stop and, after returning to the scene of the accident, refused to provide his personal information to the 17-year-old girl. During his daily internet radio broadcast, Ed Brown confirmed that "a friend" had been using Elaine Brown's vehicle to go buy food. U.S. Marshal Stephen Monier confirmed that the vehicle had been impounded and that he was investigating the circumstances of the incident.
- On July 28, reports of "30–40" shots fired at the Browns' property were posted on a website. A local media report contradicts this, stating that there was no law enforcement activity at the property, and that "[p]eople who live in that area also report no activity."

=== August 2007 ===
- On August 22, the Concord Monitor reports that Ed and Elaine Brown have "succeeded in first recruiting and then driving out an ever-changing cast of supporters from across the country."

=== September 2007 ===
- On September 12, four men are arrested by the United States Marshals Service for allegedly helping to obstruct justice in connection with the Browns' standoff. Charges against the four include accessory after the fact and possession and use of a firearm in relation to a crime of violence.

=== October 4, 2007 arrest: The standoff ends ===
On October 4, 2007, Ed and Elaine Brown were arrested without incident, ending the standoff. United States Marshal Stephen Monier stated: "The Browns may now begin serving their 63-month federal prison terms… High profile situations like this are always difficult, but they don't have to be tragic. I'm glad no one was injured, and that the community remained safe throughout the operation."

The Browns were arrested by undercover officers, who were invited by the Browns into the Brown residence on the evening of Thursday, October 4, 2007. "[B]efore the couple realized they weren't supporters, they were already under arrest." A local television station quoted U.S. Marshal Monier as saying: "Ultimately, this open-door policy that they [the Browns] seemed to have which allowed the Browns to have some supporters bring them supplies, welcome followers and even host a picnic—this proved to be their undoing… They invited us in. We escorted them out."

After the arrests, law enforcement personnel began searching the home and found weapons, ammunition, explosive devices and booby traps. Law enforcement officials found twenty "suspected pipe bombs," nine "destructive devices," bags of high explosives hanging in the trees, smoke grenades, materials for partially constructed nail bombs, two .50-caliber rifles, 18 other guns, and over 60,000 rounds of ammunition.

At a news conference on October 5, 2007, U.S. Marshal Monier said that even more charges against the imprisoned Edward and Elaine Brown were likely: "By their continuing actions, allegedly, to obstruct justice, to encourage others to assist them to obstruct justice, by making threats toward law enforcement and other governmental officials, they have turned this into more than a tax case."

== Prison life ==
Shortly after his imprisonment, Edward Brown claimed that he has been mistreated, tasered, gassed, subjected to sensory deprivation, and isolated from other inmates.

== Trials and guilty verdicts in connection with the standoff ==
Both Edward and Elaine Brown and some of their followers were subsequently charged, tried, and found guilty of crimes in connection with the standoff.

=== Convictions of followers ===
Four individuals who assisted Ed and Elaine Brown in the standoff were convicted in connection with the matter. Danny Riley of Cohoes, New York was sentenced to 36 years in federal prison, after having been convicted of helping to supply the Browns, and of stockpiling weapons and threatening law enforcement officials. Riley was convicted of conspiracy, aiding and abetting, and using guns and bombs in connection with the standoff. Also convicted in other trials were Jason Gerhard of Brookhaven, New York (sentenced to twenty years in prison), Cirino Gonzalez of Alice, Texas (sentenced to eight years in prison), and Robert Wolffe of Randolph, Vermont (who was sentenced to two and a half years).

=== 2009 indictment, trial, and guilty verdicts for the Browns ===
As a result of the events during the standoff, Edward and Elaine Brown were indicted on January 21, 2009, by a federal grand jury in Concord, New Hampshire, and were charged with knowingly and willfully conspiring, by force, intimidation and threat, to prevent employees of the United States Marshals Service in the discharge of official duties in the arrest of the Browns, in violation of 18 U.S.C. § 372; conspiracy to commit an offense against the United States in violation of 18 U.S.C. § 371 and subsections (a) and (b) of 18 U.S.C. § 111; carrying and possessing a firearm in connection with a crime of violence, in violation of subparagraphs (A) and (B) of paragraph (1) of subsection (c) of 18 U.S.C. § 924; being a felon in possession of a firearm in violation of paragraph (1) of subsection (g) of 18 U.S.C. § 922; obstruction of justice in violation of 18 U.S.C. § 1503; and failure to appear for sentencing, in violation of 18 U.S.C. § 3146. Edward Brown was also charged with one count of failure to appear for trial in violation of 18 U.S.C. § 3146. See Indictment, United States v. Edward Brown and Elaine Brown.

The Browns filed numerous pre-trial motions, contending (among other things) that the United States is owned by Paine Webber and that "the most powerful court in America is not the United States Supreme Court, but the Supreme Court of Pennsylvania." According to the Concord Monitor, the Browns filed "about 30 motions, expressing views that their case is governed by commercial law, that they are not the people named in the indictment, that the federal government has no authority and that they can resolve all charges with 'promissory notes' for billions of dollars." The Browns also claimed: "The U.S. has not had a Treasury since 1921"; "The United States does not have any employees because there is no longer a United States"; "There are no judicial courts in America and there has not been since 1789"; "There have not been any Judges in America since 1789"; "The Revolutionary War was a fraud"; "America is a British colony"; "Britain is owned by the Vatican"; and "A 1040 form [Form 1040, U.S. Individual Income Tax Return] is for tribute paid to Britain". Elaine Brown's court-appointed lawyer requested that her competency be evaluated. On June 2, 2009, the court ruled that Edward and Elaine Brown were competent to stand trial.

On July 9, 2009, Edward and Elaine Brown were found guilty by the federal district court jury of all counts charged.

On October 2, 2009, Elaine Brown was sentenced to 35 years in a federal prison.

In January 2010, Edward Brown was sentenced to 37 years in prison.

Edward and Elaine Brown appealed these convictions to the United States Court of Appeals for the First Circuit, but the convictions were upheld by the Court of Appeals on January 19, 2012. Elaine Brown filed a petition for writ of certiorari with the United States Supreme Court, but the Supreme Court denied her petition on May 21, 2012.

Edward Brown is scheduled for release on June 9, 2034, when he would be about 92 years old. Elaine Brown was originally scheduled for release in November 2042. However, her sentence was shorted to time served as a result of a U.S. Supreme Court decision in another case which found the minimum sentencing in weapons laws, in this case a 30-year minimum for use of explosives, was invalid. She was released on February 28, 2020, and has sought divorce. Ed Brown requested a reduction to time served at appeal, but the use of explosives count was reduced to 300 months, so he would have roughly 17 additional years over his 13 served.

== See also ==
- Potentially dangerous taxpayer
- Pseudolaw
- Redemption movement
- Sovereign citizen movement
- Strawman theory
- Tax protester conspiracy arguments
- Tax protester history in the United States
- Taxation in the United States
