= Apportionment (disambiguation) =

Apportionment is a legal term for distribution or allotment in proper shares.

Apportionment may also refer to:

== Biology ==
- Niche apportionment models of relative species abundance distributions

== Law ==
- Uniform Apportionment of Tort Responsibility Act, a Uniform Act drafted by the National Conference of Commissioners on Uniform State Laws (NCCUSL)
- Formulary apportionment, a method of allocating corporate taxation between jurisdictions

== Mathematics ==
- Fair division, in game theory
- Apportionment paradox, various paradoxical proofs in political apportionment

== Business ==
- Apportionment of overhead costs across different cost centres

== Politics and government ==
- Apportionment (politics), the process of allocating the power of a set of constituent voters among their political representatives
  - Biproportional apportionment
  - Apportionment of votes in a proposed United Nations Parliamentary Assembly

=== Europe ===
- Apportionment in the European Parliament
- National apportionment of MP seats in the Riksdag (Swedish national legislature)

=== United States ===
- United States congressional apportionment
- Apportionment (OMB), distribution of US government funds
- New Jersey Apportionment Commission
- Ohio Apportionment Board
