= Porth (disambiguation) =

Porth is a village and a community in the county borough of Rhondda Cynon Taff, Wales.

Porth may also refer to:

== Places ==
- Porth, Cornwall, England
- Porth Island (also known as Trevelgue Head), headland in Cornwall, England
- Porth (crater), impact crater on Mars

== People ==
- Andreas Porth (born 1984), German bobsledder
- Ari Porth (born 1970), American attorney, jurist, and politician
- Arthur Porth (1902–1993), American tax protester

== Other uses ==
- AFC Porth, Welsh football team
