= Apportionment (OMB) =

An apportionment is an Office of Management and Budget-approved plan to use budgetary resources (31 U.S.C. §§ 1513–b; Executive Order 11541). It typically limits the obligations the federal government may incur for specified time periods, programs, activities, projects, objects, etc. An apportionment is legally binding, and obligations and expenditures (disbursements) that exceed an apportionment are a violation of, and are subject to reporting under, the Antideficiency Act.

The desired goal of the apportionment process is the promotion of economy and efficiency in the use of appropriations.

== See also ==
- United States budget process
