= Robert L. Schulz =

American activist

Robert Louis Schulz is a political activist and the Founder and Chairman of the We the People Foundation for Constitutional Education, a non-profit education and research organization with the declared mission "to protect and defend individual Rights as guaranteed by the Constitutions of the United States."

An engineer by training, Schulz has filed over one hundred court actions on a pro se basis, against government actions he asserts are unconstitutional deprivations of individual liberty.

In 1994, Schulz was on the New York State ballot as the Libertarian candidate for Governor, after nominee Howard Stern dropped out of the race.

== Federal tax problems ==
In 2006, Schulz was under investigation by the Internal Revenue Service (IRS) in connection with an alleged failure to file federal income tax returns for years 2001 through 2004.

=== Injunction against Schulz ===
On August 9, 2007, the United States District Court for the Northern District of New York issued an order including an injunction permanently barring Schulz and his We the People Foundation from (1) advising or instructing persons or entities that they are not required to file federal tax returns or pay federal taxes (see Tax protester arguments); (2) selling or furnishing any materials purporting to enable individuals to discontinue or stop withholding or paying federal taxes; (3) instructing, advising or assisting anyone to stop withholding or stop paying federal employment or income taxes; and (4) obstructing or advising anyone to obstruct IRS examinations, collections, or other IRS proceedings. The court found that Schulz and the We the People Foundation were engaging in illegal activity that was exposing individuals to criminal liability in connection with federal income taxes. In February 2008, that decision was affirmed by the United States Court of Appeals for the Second Circuit. In its decision, the Court of Appeals stated:

The district court found that defendants' illegal activities were harming individuals, who were exposing themselves to criminal liability by following the defendants' ill-conceived instructions. ... Requiring defendants to provide the identity and contact information of the recipients of the tax materials enables the government to monitor the defendants' obligation under the injunction to provide a copy of the district court's order to recipients of the tax materials. Moreover, the district court found that the defendants' illegal actions were harming the government ... Requiring defendants to provide the identity and contact information [ . . . ] enables the government to monitor whether the recipients of defendants' materials are violating the tax laws. Thus, we find no abuse of discretion with respect to the district court's imposition of the reporting requirements in Paragraph C of the injunction.

=== Contempt proceeding ===
On April 7, 2008, the government filed a motion in the United States District Court for the Northern District of New York, asking the court to hold Robert L. Schulz and the We the People Foundation in civil contempt of court for failure to comply with the court order requiring Schulz to turn over, to the government, the names and contact information of the individuals who had received tax materials from the Foundation. On April 28, 2008, the District Court issued an order holding Schulz and the other defendants in contempt of court, imposing fines of $2,000 per day on Schulz, the We the People Foundation, and the We the People Congress, effective retroactively to April 28, 2008, if the defendants did not comply with the court order by 4:00 p.m. on Monday, May 5, 2008. At 3:55 pm on May 5, 2008, Schulz filed a document with the court asserting that he had turned the material over to the United States attorney's office earlier that day.

== Other activities ==
On December 1, 2008, Schulz questioned whether President-elect Obama is a natural born citizen of the United States. He placed an ad which he claimed to be worth "tens of thousands" of dollars in the Chicago Tribune to express his foundation's belief. The Southern Poverty Law Center (SPLC) has published an article asserting that in 2009, Schulz began "to play a key role in building a larger movement, one with concerns that went far beyond challenging the legality of taxes and Obama's holding the office of president." The SPLC asserts that Schulz has been playing a "key, and little-noticed, part in the dramatic expansion of the radical right...."
