= Arthur Porth =

American building contractor and activist (1902–1993)

Arthur Julius Porth (July 9, 1902 – February 8, 1993) was a Wichita, Kansas building contractor and tax protester who ran afoul of the federal government in the mid-20th century.

In the case of Porth v. Brodrick, he sued the government for a refund of $135 in taxes he paid for the tax year 1951, claiming that he was placed in a position of involuntary servitude contrary to the Thirteenth Amendment to the United States Constitution and alleging that the clear intent of Congress in adopting the Sixteenth Amendment was to provide for a fair, just and reasonable source of revenue to the United States Government through a simple and direct levy or tax upon the income of the people, but that Federal tax legislation enacted after the ratification of the Sixteenth Amendment had given rise to such a mass of ambiguous, contradictory, inequitable and unjust rules, regulations and methods of procedure, that the taxpayer's rights as a citizen of the United States had been placed in jeopardy because the present and existing tax laws, rules, regulations and methods of procedure had compelled him to assume unreasonable duties, obligations and burdens in order to make a just accounting of his income and pay the tax thereon. His petition was denied.

In 1966, Porth was charged with and was later convicted of failure to deduct withholding taxes from employees' paychecks, failure to file withholding tax returns, and failure to file his own individual tax return for the year 1963. The convictions were upheld on appeal.

After the tax convictions, he successfully challenged a district court probationary condition banning him from speaking or writing on the constitutionality of the Federal Reserve System and the U.S. Federal income tax laws.

According to the Anti-Defamation League, Porth pioneered the tax protest movement; his "most influential effort came in the early 1960s, when he filed a tax return that was blank except for a statement declaring that he was pleading the Fifth Amendment (i.e., claiming that filling out a tax return violated his right not to be compelled to be a witness against himself). Moreover, Porth became an activist; he traveled around the country distributing tax protest literature, including a book titled A Manual for Those Who Think That They Must Pay an Income Tax." Porth claimed that Federal Reserve Notes are of little or no value. At one point, tax returns containing tax protester arguments similar to those made by Porth were sometimes informally referred to as "Porth returns."

The Southern Poverty Law Center describes Porth's claims that the Sixteenth Amendment to the United States Constitution "put Americans into economic bondage to the international bankers" as a thinly veiled antisemitic reference to the supposed "international Jewish banking conspiracy."

== See also ==
- Tax protester history in the United States
