= Arthur Farnsworth =

American tax resistor (born 1962)

Arthur L. Farnsworth (born 1962) is an American politician and convicted tax protester. Evidence found by the government in Farnsworth's case helped the government indict actor Wesley Snipes on tax charges.

Farnsworth received his bachelor's degree in electrical engineering from Widener University and a master's degree in engineering science from Penn State. He ran for a number of offices as a member of the Libertarian Party of Pennsylvania, and served as township auditor for West Rockhill Township. Farnsworth also served as the treasurer of the Pennsylvania Libertarian Party. He ran as a candidate for the United States House of Representatives for Pennsylvania's 8th congressional district in 2004 and drew 3,710 votes.

== Tax problems ==
In November 2004 Farnsworth was arrested on charges of tax evasion of approximately $87,000 in Federal income taxes under 26 U.S.C. § 7201 for years 1998, 1999, and 2000. On the campaign trail as well as on his personal website, Farnsworth argued that the federal law makes the payment of income taxes voluntary.

A federal grand jury charged the electrical engineer with failure to pay taxes for three years on more than $221,000 in income and with attempting to conceal his earnings by transferring assets to fraudulent trusts and overseas bank accounts.

During the case, investigators found that one of the trust funds belonged to actor Wesley Snipes. Snipes himself was indicted on tax charges in October 2006. Snipes was convicted of three misdemeanor counts of failing to file Federal income tax returns (and was acquitted on other tax charges).

On December 11, 2006, a federal jury in the United States District Court for the Eastern District of Pennsylvania found Farnsworth guilty of tax evasion.

Farnsworth was sentenced on April 3, 2007, to 27 months in prison. He was also fined $500 and ordered to cooperate with Internal Revenue Service investigators in documenting his finances and beginning to pay his tax debt of almost $83,000. On December 11, 2008, Farnsworth's conviction was upheld by the United States Court of Appeals for the Third Circuit.

Farnsworth was incarcerated at the Federal Correctional Institution at Fairton, New Jersey, and was released in April 2009.

On March 24, 2010, Farnsworth appeared in federal court in Philadelphia in connection with alleged violations of the terms of his release from federal prison. In court papers filed on March 15, 2010, Farnsworth's probation officer charged that Farnsworth had refused to comply with directives issued by the Internal Revenue Service required by court order. The government alleged that Farnsworth had been collecting wages "under the table" while working at a sandwich shop and had not reported the wages on his tax returns. On May 3, 2010, U.S. District Judge John R. Padova ordered Farnsworth back to the federal prison camp for an additional four months because of violations of Farnsworth's supervised release. Farnsworth was incarcerated at the Federal Detention Center in Philadelphia, and was released on October 1, 2010.
