= Tax protester 861 argument =

Statutory argument used by tax protesters in the United States

The 861 argument is a statutory argument used by tax protesters in the United States, which interprets a portion of the Internal Revenue Code as invalidating certain applications of income tax. The argument has uniformly been held by courts to be incorrect, and persons who have cited the argument as a basis for refusing to pay income taxes have been penalized, and in some cases jailed.

== Description of the argument ==
Internal Revenue Code section 861, entitled "Income from sources within the United States", is a provision of the Internal Revenue Code which delineates that some kinds of income shall be treated as income from sources within the United States, namely income of nonresident alien individuals, and certain foreign corporations, but it is not an exhaustive list of taxable income—the definitions in the section apply only to that section. The language of Section 861 is occasionally cited by tax protesters who claim that the statute excludes some portion of the income of U.S. citizens and resident aliens from taxation.

Under the tax protesters' section 861 argument, only income derived from "taxable activities" listed in that section becomes "taxable income" (taxable "gross income" minus allowable deductions - 26 U.S.C. § 63). The list of taxable activities is located in Subchapter N and in Section 861 regulations. Proponents of this argument state that individuals with domestic income must go to the Section 861 regulations to determine if the activities that generate their income are taxable or not. Protesters state that regulation section 1.861-8T(d)(2)(iii) defines the taxable activities. The argument is that since the domestic activities of residents of the United States (Americans and resident aliens) are not shown to be taxable in that section, the domestic income derived from such activities does not become taxable "gross income" through the rest of the tax code.

Tax protesters argue that the Internal Revenue Service (IRS) is misapplying section 861 to them, citing the case of Gould v. Gould. The text of that case reads in part:

In the interpretation of statutes levying taxes it is the established rule not to extend their provisions, by implication, beyond the clear import of the language used, or to enlarge their operations so as to embrace matters not specifically pointed out. In case of doubt they are construed most strongly against the government, and in favor of the citizen.

Tax protesters argue that Gould v. Gould nullifies what tax protesters view as an attempt by the IRS to tax beyond the explicit provisions of the law. Section 861 did not exist in the year 1917, when the Gould case was decided, and the Court was neither presented with nor decided the issue of whether domestic or foreign income is not taxable. The terms "domestic income" and "foreign income" do not appear in the case, and the court's main ruling in Gould v. Gould—that alimony was not taxable to the recipient under the Revenue Act of 1913—was overturned by a subsequent Act of Congress, the current version of which is found in the Internal Revenue Code of 1986 at 26 U.S.C. § 71.

== Court decisions ==
The income taxes imposed on U.S. citizens and resident aliens are generally imposed under Subchapter A (not Subchapter N) of Chapter 1 of the Code. The income tax is imposed on the "taxable income" of individuals.

The federal courts have consistently ruled that the argument that Section 861 excludes income of U.S. citizens and resident aliens from taxation is without legal merit. See Aiello v. Commissioner; Williams v. Commissioner; Corcoran v. Commissioner; Loofbourrow v. Commissioner.; United States v. Bell; Dashiell v. Commissioner.; Woods v. Commissioner; and Buckardt v. Commissioner.

The argument that United States citizens and residents are not subject to tax on their wages, etc., derived from sources within the United States, and variations of this argument, have been officially identified as legally frivolous Federal tax return positions for purposes of the $5,000 frivolous tax return penalty imposed under Internal Revenue Code section 6702(a).

The earliest reported case in which section 861 is raised as a limitation on the income tax is the 1993 case of Solomon v. Commissioner. In that case, the protester's primary argument was that "the State of Illinois is not part of the United States", and that he was therefore a resident alien, subject to taxation only under the provisions of §861. The court ruled:

[P]etitioner's position is not bolstered by the regulations under section 861. To the contrary, section 861(a)(1) and (3) provides that interest from the United States and compensation for labor or personal services performed in the United States (with exceptions not applicable here) are items of gross income which shall be treated as income from sources within the United States.

In Solomon, the court also stated:

The record in this case establishes that petitioner had no interest in disputing either the deficiencies or the additions to tax determined by respondent. Furthermore, it is clear that petitioner instituted this action to delay the assessment and collection of his Federal income taxes. Rather, petitioner has raised only the tired, discredited arguments which are characterized as tax protester rhetoric. A petition to the Tax Court is frivolous if it is contrary to established law and unsupported by a reasoned, colorable argument for change in the law.… Based upon the established law, petitioner's position is frivolous and groundless. Taxpayers with genuine controversies were delayed while we considered this case. Accordingly, we will require petitioner to pay a penalty to the United States in the amount of $5,000.

More recent attempts to avoid payment of taxes using the 861 argument have not contended that the protesters were non-citizens, but that the provision should be read as extending to all taxes. These efforts have resulted in a number of high-profile convictions of its proponents. Larken Rose, a noted advocate of the 861 argument, used the argument to challenge the IRS, and lost:

On November 22, 2005, in Philadelphia, PA, Larken Rose was sentenced to 15 months in prison, followed by one year supervised release and fined $10,000. Rose was convicted by jury in August 2005 to five counts of willful failure to file federal income tax returns. According to the evidence introduced at trial, Rose willfully failed to file personal federal income tax returns for calendar years 1998 through 2002, despite earning $500,000 during those years. On those amended returns, he reported no tax due and requested a refund for all income taxes paid in those years. At trial, Rose claimed that he failed to file returns and sought refund claims based on his determination that his income received inside the United States was not taxable under Internal Revenue Code Section 861 and regulations. The judge instructed the jury that this Section 861 argument is incorrect as a matter of law.

In August 2006, Charles Thomas (Tom) Clayton, M.D., was found guilty by a jury in Federal court in Texas of two counts of willfully making false statements on tax returns and six counts of willfully failing to file tax returns. According to The Courier of Montgomery County, "Clayton's defense at the trial centered on the '861 argument' -- a defense used numerous times in previous years, but never successfully…" According to a Justice Department news release, Clayton failed to file income tax returns for years 1999 through 2004 while receiving over $1.5 million in gross income. The government also charged that for years 1997 and 1998 Clayton filed false amended returns, claiming refunds of over $160,000. Criminal investigators of the Internal Revenue Service had gathered information on Clayton during the IRS investigation of Larken Rose (see above). According to the prosecutor's office, Clayton "disregarded multiple written notices from the Internal Revenue Service informing him that his 861 argument was without merit", and Clayton "had also been told the same thing by two Certified Public Accountants". On December 15, 2006, Clayton was sentenced to five years in prison and a fine of $50,000, plus a requirement that he pay over $7,400 in prosecution costs. He appealed, but his conviction was upheld on appeal.

In 2006, the government alleged that actor Wesley Snipes fraudulently attempted to obtain tax refunds using the 861 argument. On February 1, 2008, Snipes was found guilty on three misdemeanor counts of failing to file Federal income tax returns. He was acquitted on one felony count of conspiracy to defraud the government and one felony count of filing a false claim with the government. Following the acquittal, Snipes faced up to three years in prison, rather than the 16 years the felony charges could have brought. On April 24, 2008, Snipes was sentenced to three years in prison. Wesley Snipes' appeal of the three-year sentence was denied by a federal appeals court on Friday, July 16, 2010. He was released to home confinement on April 2, 2013. Co-defendant Eddie Ray Kahn was sentenced to ten years in prison, and another defendant, Douglas Rosile, was sentenced to four and half years in prison.

In another, less widely reported 2008 case, Clifford B. Marston was convicted of tax evasion and related claims despite his argument that his non-filing was based on a good faith belief that his income was not taxable. Marston's conviction was upheld in part because he failed to file even after he became aware that Larken Rose (a proponent of the 861 argument) had been convicted of tax-related offenses.

== Proponents ==
David Thomas Bosset (August 25, 1944 – August 3, 2009) was a promoter of tax evasion schemes, including the 861 argument. He himself refused to withhold for taxes. He was the subject of a permanent injunction prohibiting him from engaging in further 861 advocacy.
