= Internal Revenue Code section 861 =

Internal Revenue Code 861, 26 U.S.C. § 861, titled "Income from sources within the United States" is a provision of the Internal Revenue Code which lists "The following items of gross income shall be treated as income from sources within the United States", for purposes of various taxes imposed by Subchapter N (sections 861 through 999) of Chapter 1 of Subtitle A of the Code.

Among the taxes to which section 861 relates are:

the section 871(a) (26 U.S.C. § 871(a)) tax on certain items of income of nonresident alien individuals not in connection with a United States business, generally equal to 30% of certain amounts received by such nonresident alien individuals;

the section 871(b) 26 U.S.C. § 871(b)) tax on certain items of income of nonresident alien individuals effectively connected with the conduct of a United States business;

the section 881 (26 U.S.C. § 881) and section 882 (26 U.S.C. § 882) taxes on the income of certain foreign corporations; and

the section 887 (26 U.S.C. § 887) tax on the "gross transportation income" of certain nonresident aliens and foreign corporations.

Section 861 sets forth a number of definitions for terms used in the section. A particularly widespread statutory argument used by tax protesters interprets these definitions to apply throughout the tax code, with the conclusion that only income described in section 861 is taxable. The IRS and federal courts have consistently rejected this interpretation, as in US v. Wesley Snipes et al.
