= Coercive deficiency =

In United States federal government finance, coercive deficiency is a process by which budget holders can allow themselves to run out of money prior to the end of a fiscal period, on the assumption that Congress will then feel morally obligated to supply the missing funding in order to prevent cessation of services or breach of contracts.

The phrase was coined by American political economist and historian Lucius Wilmerding, Jr. in his 1943 book The Spending Power: A History of the Efforts of Congress to Control Expenditures.

The first attempt to control for coercive deficiency requests to Congress was the Anti-Deficiency Act of 1870, which prevented agencies from obligating more funds than had been appropriated by Congress. Historians have documented examples of coercive deficiencies at the U.S. Post Office in 1879 and 1947 and at the Defense Department.
