= Potentially dangerous taxpayer =

Designation by the Internal Revenue Service

Potentially Dangerous Taxpayer (PDT) is a government designation assigned by the Internal Revenue Service (IRS) to taxpayers of the United States of America whom IRS officials claim have demonstrated a capacity for violence against employees of the IRS or other government agencies, contractors or their families. Suspected PDT cases are handled by the Treasury Inspector General for Tax Administration.

== Criteria ==
The IRS has established the following criteria for assessing a taxpayer as a PDT, any one of which is sufficient for declaring a taxpayer a PDT:

1. Taxpayers who have committed acts of violence against IRS employees, contractors and/or their families;
2. Taxpayers who threaten or intimidate IRS employees, contractors and/or members of their family by threats of bodily harm or other intrinsically threatening behavior, such as stalking;
3. Taxpayers who are actively involved in groups which promote violence against IRS or other government employees;
4. Taxpayers who have in fact committed acts of violence or intimidation against employees or contractors of other federal, state, county or local government organization; or
5. Taxpayers who have demonstrated a capacity for violence by commission of any of the aforementioned acts of violence in the previous five years.

The Internal Revenue Service also designates certain taxpayers as "Caution Upon Contact" taxpayers, or "CAU" taxpayers. The guidelines for the CAU designation are:

1. Threat of physical harm that is less severe or immediate than necessary to satisfy PDT [potentially dangerous taxpayer] criteria;
2. Suicide threat by the taxpayer; or
3. Filing or threatening to file a frivolous lien or a frivolous criminal or civil legal action against an IRS employee or contractor or an IRS employee's or contractor's immediate family member.

== Incidents ==
In response to an inquiry after the February 18, 2010, suicidal attack on an office of the IRS at Austin, Texas, by Andrew Joseph Stack that resulted in his death and that of an IRS employee, an IRS spokesperson indicated that the IRS also declined to state whether Stack had been designated as a PDT. Mark Pitcavage of the Anti-Defamation League called Stack a lone-wolf "homegrown, self-taught extremist" with possible ties to the Tax Protest Movement.

This is a chart from an IRS report that shows data on quantities:

Calendar Year	PDT Case Closures	PDT Determinations	CAU Case Closures	CAU Determinations
2008	960	163	615	601
2009	989	136	706	695
2010	1,154	151	774	747
2011	1531	158	993	967
2012 (Note: Only up until July of 2012.)	691	117	492	473

In 2009, Randy Nowak of Mulberry, Florida, was convicted and sentenced to 30 years in prison for attempting to hire a hitman to murder the IRS agent doing his audit.

In other cases, disgruntled taxpayers have enclosed foreign objects with their returns.

== See also ==
- Gordon Kahl
- Edward and Elaine Brown
- 2010 Austin suicide attack
- Tax protester
- Tax protester history in the United States
