= Richard Michael Simkanin =

Richard Michael Simkanin (died 2010) was a tax protester who was imprisoned after having been convicted on twenty-nine counts of United States federal tax crimes.

== Background ==
Simkanin owned a company in Bedford, Texas, called Arrow Custom Plastics, Inc. In 1993, an accountant advised Simkanin that a required change in the accounting method for the company would result in greater corporate income tax. Simkanin then began to question the validity of the federal income tax. On his 1994 and 1995 personal tax returns, he made notations to indicate that the returns were filed under protest, and he did not file personal returns for years 1996 through 2001.

Simkanin told his accountant he was not required to file returns because he lived off his savings and had no income. The United States Court of Appeals for the Fifth Circuit, in affirming his conviction, stated that this assertion was false and that Simkanin had received a salary from his company. The Court also stated that Simkanin had received payments from Arrow for his personal expenses and that those payments were booked as "repair and maintenance".

In reviewing the case, the Fifth Circuit Court of Appeals stated:

In 1996, Simkanin surrendered his Texas driver's license, and when stopped by the police while driving, he showed a card styled "British West Indies International Motor Vehicle Qualification Card" which he had acquired from a mail-order business in Connecticut. He also mailed the U.S. Treasury Secretary a statement that he had expatriated himself from the United States and repatriated to the Republic of Texas. He posted the same statement on Arrow's internet website, where he also vowed to ignore the laws of the United States.

In 1997, Simkanin removed his name from Arrow's checking and credit card accounts, replacing his name with the name of Arrow's bookkeeper [...] Simkanin told [the bookkeeper] that he did not want his name to appear on documents requiring his social security number. Simkanin then listed [the bookkeeper] as Arrow's president on various legal documents, although he retained complete de facto responsibility for the company's affairs and continued to make all of the decisions regarding finances and taxes.

By May 1999, Simkanin had become involved with an organization called We The People Foundation for Constitutional Education ("WTP"), which promotes the view that, despite common misconceptions, there is actually no law that requires most Americans to pay income taxes or most companies to withhold taxes from employees' paychecks. WTP also espouses the view that the Sixteenth Amendment was fraudulently declared to have been ratified. In accordance with these views, Simkanin told [his] accountant [...] and others that he was not required to pay taxes and that filing returns was purely voluntary. [The accountant] advised Simkanin that filing returns was not voluntary and that Simkanin could get into trouble if he did not file. Simkanin rejected this advice, and he began to pressure Arrow's employees to attend seminars sponsored by WTP.

== Advertisement in USA Today ==
On March 2, 2002, a photograph of Simkanin and four other people appeared in a full-page advertisement in USA Today which announced that he had not withheld income taxes from the paychecks of his company's employees because he believed the income tax to be voluntary. The advertisement also requested donations for the We the People Foundation.

== Arrest, trial and conviction ==
In June 2003, Simkanin was arrested and arraigned on various tax charges . On January 7, 2004, he was convicted by a United States federal court on ten counts of willfully failing to collect and pay over employment taxes under 26 U.S.C. § 7202, fifteen counts of knowingly making and presenting false, fictitious or fraudulent claims for refund of employment taxes under 18 U.S.C. § 287 and 18 U.S.C. § 2, and four counts of willfully failing to timely file federal income tax returns under 26 U.S.C. § 7203. His convictions were upheld on appeal.

Simkanin was sentenced to seven years in federal prison. After the sentencing, the Houston Chronicle reported: "U.S. District Judge John McBryde said during the sentencing that Simkanin was 'entrenched' in a 'cultlike' anti-government group that 'holds nothing but contempt for the laws of the United States. McBryde ordered Simkanin to pay the government $302,076 in restitution." The Houston Chronicle also reported that a prosecutor indicated that Internal Revenue Service agents and prosecutors had given Simkanin "repeated opportunities to reconsider his position and begin paying taxes" before the government began criminal prosecution. Assistant United States Attorney David Jarvis was quoted as saying "I guess he just figured we wouldn't do anything."

Simkanin was incarcerated at the Federal Correctional Institution at Texarkana, Texas. He was released on June 18, 2010. However, on June 23, 2010, he was order jailed again, pending a hearing to be held on July 1, 2010, regarding alleged violations of his terms of release.

On July 2, 2010, his terms of release were revoked, and the Court sentenced him to an additional six years and seven months in prison. He was incarcerated at the Beaumont Low Federal Correctional Complex at Beaumont, Texas, and had been scheduled for release on March 18, 2016.

While serving his sentence, Simkanin died on December 28, 2010, at the age of sixty-seven.
