= Tax protester statutory arguments =

Legal positions advanced by tax protestors

Tax protesters in the United States have advanced a number of arguments asserting that the assessment and collection of the federal income tax violates statutes enacted by the United States Congress and signed into law by the President. Such arguments generally claim that certain statutes fail to create a duty to pay taxes, that such statutes do not impose the income tax on wages or other types of income claimed by the tax protesters, or that provisions within a given statute exempt the tax protesters from a duty to pay.

These statutory arguments are distinguished from, although related to, constitutional, administrative and general conspiracy arguments. Statutory arguments presuppose that Congress has a constitutional power to tax income (and typically accept the validity of the 16th Amendment, unlike some other theories) but has not passed a statute doing so, or has done so in a way that renders certain types of income not liable to taxation.

== Definition of the terms "state" and "includes" ==
In connection with various arguments that the Federal income tax should not apply to citizens or residents within the fifty states, some tax protesters have argued about the meanings of the terms "state" and "includes".

=== Tax protester arguments ===
One argument is that the definitions of "state" and "United States" in most subparts and the general definition in the Internal Revenue Code are what other amending code sections refer to as "a special definition of 'state'", where the statutory definitions include the District of Columbia, Puerto Rico, and some other territories, without mentioning the 50 states. Under this argument, the definition of "state" within the Code in general, or within those certain subparts of the Code, refers only to territories, or the possessions of the federal government, or the District of Columbia. Alaska and Hawaii were formerly included in the "special" definition of a "state" until each was removed from that general definition by the Alaska Omnibus Act and the Hawaii Omnibus Act when they were respectively admitted to the Union.

The Internal Revenue Code general definition of the term "state" in section 7701 is as follows:

The term "State" shall be construed to include the District of Columbia, where such construction is necessary to carry out provisions of this title.

Other subparts of the Internal Revenue Code list the District of Columbia and territories of the United States in response to the definition of "State," or geographically, the "United States" (26 C.F.R § 31.3132 (e)-1)

The Internal Revenue Code general definition of the terms "includes" and "including" is as follows:

The terms "includes" and "including" when used in a definition contained in this title shall not be deemed to exclude other things otherwise within the meaning of the term defined.

The 1911 case of Montello Salt Co. v. Utah, the Supreme Court stated that the term "including" is generally interchangeable with "also" but not necessarily, and can sometimes have a meaning of exclusivity. The Montello Salt case was not a Federal tax case, and no issues involving the meaning of the terms "state" or "includes" or "including" as used in the Internal Revenue Code were presented to or decided by the Court. The word "tax" is not found in the text of the Montello Salt decision.

=== Court rulings on the Internal Revenue Code definitions of "state" and "includes" ===
In a 1959 tax case, the United States Supreme Court indicated that the term "includes" in the Internal Revenue Code (26 U.S.C. § 7701) is a term of expansion, not a term of exclusivity. Subsection (c) of section 7701 provides:

The terms "includes" and "including" when used in a definition contained in this title shall not be deemed to exclude other things otherwise within the meaning of the term defined.

Similarly, in the case of United States v. Condo, the United States Court of Appeals for the Ninth Circuit stated:

[the taxpayer's] other tax theories are equally frivolous. His assertion that 26 U.S.C. § 7343 only applies to business entities and their employees ignores the word "includes" in the statute delineating the class of persons liable. The word "includes" expands, not limits, the definition of "person" to these entities.

No federal court has upheld the argument that the term "state" as used in the Internal Revenue Code excludes the fifty states or that the term "state" means only the "District of Columbia." The argument that the term "state" as used in Federal income tax law means only the District of Columbia and the territories was specifically rejected by the United States Court of Appeals for the Eleventh Circuit in United States v. Ward. Similarly, in the case of Nieman v. Commissioner, the taxpayer argued that "Congress excludes the 50 States from the definition of "United States", for the purposes of 26 U.S.C., Subtitle A." The United States Tax Court rejected that argument, stating:

Petitioner attempts to argue an absurd proposition, essentially that the State of Illinois is not part of the United States. His hope is that he will find some semantic technicality which will render him exempt from Federal income tax, which applies generally to all U.S. citizens and residents. Suffice it to say, we find no support in any of the authorities petitioner cites for his position that he is not subject to Federal income tax on income he earned in Illinois.

See also United States v. Bell (taxpayer's argument -- that the term "United States" encompasses "only territories and possessions such as the 'Commonwealth of Puerto Rico, the Virgin Islands, Guam, and American Samoa' [ . . . ] but not the contiguous 48 states, Hawaii and Alaska" by contending that the term "include" was a term of "limitation"—was rejected). See also Friesen v. Commissioner (taxpayer's argument—that Nebraska was "without" the United States and that as a Nebraska resident the taxpayer was "alien to the foreign Federal jurisdiction" and therefore not subject to income tax—was rejected).

The argument that the United States does not include all or a part of the physical territory of the fifty states, and variations of this argument, have been officially identified as legally frivolous Federal tax return positions for purposes of the $5,000 frivolous tax return penalty imposed under Internal Revenue Code section 6702(a).

=== The private sector employee argument ===
An argument linked to the meaning of the words "includes" and "including" is the argument that for Federal income tax purposes, the term "employee" under Internal Revenue Code section 3401(c) does not include a regular, private-sector employee. The courts have uniformly rejected this argument. The text of section 3401(c), which deals only with the employer's withholding requirements and not with the employee's requirement to report Internal Revenue Code section 61 compensation for personal services (whether called wages, salaries, or any other term), is as follows:

For purposes of this chapter, the term "employee" includes an officer, employee, or elected official of the United States, a State, or any political subdivision thereof, or the District of Columbia, or any agency or instrumentality of any one or more of the foregoing. The term "employee" also includes an officer of a corporation.

In Sullivan v. United States, taxpayer Grant W. Sullivan argued that he had not received "wages" and was not an "employee" under Internal Revenue Code section 3401(c). The United States Court of Appeals for the First Circuit ruled against Sullivan, stating:

To the extent Sullivan argues that he received no "wages" in 1983 because he was not an "employee" within the meaning of 26 U.S.C. §3401(c), that contention is meritless. Section 3401(c), which relates to income tax withholding, indicates that the definition of "employee" includes government officers and employees, elected officials, and corporate officers. The statute does not purport to limit withholding to the persons listed therein.

In United States v. Ferguson, taxpayer Joy Ferguson argued that she was not an "employee" under section 3401(c), and that she therefore could not have "wages." The court ruled against her, stating:

The core of the dispute before the court is Ferguson's assertion that she was not an "employee" as defined by §3401(c) of the Internal Revenue Code, and therefore did not earn any "wages." [footnote omitted] As such, she argues that her Form 1040 and Form 4862 accurately reported her wages as zero. As noted by the government, Ferguson's interpretation of §3401(c) has been considered and rejected numerous times by many courts. This Court would agree with the overwhelming precedent on this issue, Ferguson's argument that she is not an employee as defined by §3401(c) is frivolous.

In Luesse v. United States, taxpayer Chell C. Luesse of St. Louis Park, Minnesota, argued that he received no "wages" because he was not an "employee" under section 3401(c). The court ruled against Mr. Luesse.

In Richey v. Stewart, the court stated:

Another familiar argument from Mr. Richey [the taxpayer] is that he is not an employee under the terms of the Internal Revenue Code, citing Section 3401(c), which states that the term "employee" includes government employees. What Mr. Richey misapprises in his reading of the statute is the inclusionary nature of the language. The Code does not exclude all other persons from taxation who are not government employees.

In United States v. Charboneau, the court stated:

[ . . . ] Ms. Charboneau contends that the Code's definitions of "wage income" and "self employment income" only include income derived from individuals who work for the federal government, or whose work involves that of "the performance of the functions of a public office." Because Ms. Charboneau never worked for any federal or state government during the tax years in question, she claims that the IRS cannot make any tax assessments against her.

This nonsensical argument is belied by the plain language of the Internal Revenue Code itself. For example, 26 U.S.C. §3401 defines wages as "all remuneration (other than fees paid to a public official) for services performed by an employee for his employer...." 26 U.S.C. §3401(a) (emphasis added). The statute then goes on to define various exceptions to this broad definition of wages in certain categories of private employment, such as in the agricultural and domestic service fields, newspaper delivery, the clergy, and for wages incurred by individuals working for employers "other than the United States or an agency therof" within Puerto Rico or a possession of the United States. There is nothing in the statute limiting "wages" to solely publicly derived income. [footnotes omitted]

Ms. Charboneau, however, focuses on §3401(c), which states that:

the term "employee" includes an officer, employee, or elected official of the United States, a State, or any political subdivision thereof, or the District of Columbia, or any agency or instrumentality of any one or more of the foregoing. The term "employee" also includes an officer of a corporation.

26 U.S.C. §3401(c). Setting aside the last sentence of this provision, which clearly states that officers of private corporations are considered employees for purposes of determining wages, it is obvious that within the context of this statute that the word "includes" is a term of enlargement, not of limitation, and the reference to certain public officers and employees was not intended to exclude all others. See also Sims v. United States, 359 U.S. 108, 112-13 (1959) (concluding that similar provision in 26 U.S.C. §6331 dealing with levies on salaries and wages does not exclude wages of private citizens); Sullivan v. United States, 788 F.2d 813,815 ("[Section 3401(c)] does not purport to limit withholding to persons listed therein"); United States v. Latham, 754 F.2d 747, 750 (7th Cir. 1985) (the Internal Revenue Code definition of "employee" in 26 U.S.C. §3401 does not exclude privately employed wage earners);. In addition, 26 U.S.C. §7701, which provides the definitions of terms used throughout the Internal Revenue Code, states that the "terms 'includes' and 'including' when used in a definition contained in this title shall not be deemed to exclude other things otherwise within the meaning of the term defined." 26 U.S.C. §7701(c).

In McCoy v. United States, the court stated:

McCoy argues she should not have to pay taxes for 1996-98 because under Code Section 3401 she was not an "employee" which she contends is defined as an elected or appointed employee or official of the federal government. McCoy clearly misconstrues Section 3401(c). The definition of "employee" includes private-sector employees, employees of the federal government, as well as elected and appointed officials. The very language of the Code is inclusive, not limited to the examples of included persons.

Joseph Alan Fennell's argument — that the compensation he received in exchange for "non-federally privileged private sector labor" was not taxable—was rejected by the United States Tax Court. Fennell appealed his Tax Court loss, but the United States Court of Appeals for the District of Columbia Circuit ruled that Fennell's challenges were "frivolous on the merits in any event." Similarly, in United States v. Buras, the argument that the taxpayer can be subject to the federal income tax only if he benefits from a "privilege extended by a government agency" was ruled to be without merit. See also Olson v. United States and Nichols v. United States.

A penalty of $1,000 under Internal Revenue Code section 6673 was imposed by the U.S. Tax Court on Patrick Michael Mooney for presenting frivolous arguments. The court rejected his argument that his wages earned from a private employer were not taxable. The court also rejected his argument that the term "employee" was limited to "someone performing the functions of a public office."

The United States Court of Appeals for the Eleventh Circuit ruled that an argument by Robert S. Morse that his income was not subject to federal taxation because it was derived from employment in the "private sector" was frivolous, and that Morse was liable for monetary sanctions, under Rule 38 of the Federal Rules of Appellate Procedure, for making a frivolous argument.

The argument that only certain types of taxpayers (such as only Federal government employees, corporations, nonresident aliens, residents of the District of Columbia, or residents of Federal territories) are subject to income tax and employment tax, and variations of this argument, have been officially identified as legally frivolous Federal tax return positions for purposes of the $5,000 frivolous tax return penalty imposed under Internal Revenue Code section 6702(a).

== Arguments about the legal obligation to pay tax ==
Some tax protesters argue that there is no law imposing a Federal income tax or requiring the filing of a return, or that the government is obligated to show the tax protesters the law or tell the protesters why they are subject to tax, or that the government has refused to disclose the law.

=== The Internal Revenue Code as a statute enacted by Congress ===
A New York Times article on July 31, 2006, states that when filmmaker Aaron Russo asked an IRS spokesman for the law requiring payment of income taxes on wages and was provided a link to various documents including title 26 of the United States Code (the Internal Revenue Code), Russo denied that title 26 was the law, contending that it consisted only of IRS "regulations" and had not been enacted by Congress.

The version of the Internal Revenue Code published as "title 26" of the United States Code is what the Office of Law Revision Counsel of the U.S. House of Representatives refers to as "non-positive law." It is one of a number; titles 2, 6–8, 12, 15, 16, 19–22, 24–27, 29, 30, 33, 34, 40–43, 45, 47, 48, and 50 are "non-positive law". However, according to the United States Statutes at Large, the original version of the current 1986 code was enacted by the Eighty-Third Congress of the United States as the Internal Revenue Code of 1954, with the phrase "Be it enacted by the Senate and House of Representatives of the United States of America in Congress assembled." The Code was approved (signed into law) by President Dwight D. Eisenhower at 9:45 A.M., Eastern Daylight Time, on Monday, August 16, 1954, and was published as volume 68A of the United States Statutes at Large. Section 1(a)(1) of the enactment states: "The provisions of this Act set forth under the heading 'Internal Revenue Title' may be cited as the 'Internal Revenue Code of 1954'. Section 1(d) of the enactment is entitled "Enactment of Internal Revenue Title Into Law", and the text of the Code follows, beginning with the statutory Table of Contents. The enactment ends with the approval (enactment) notation on page 929. Section 2(a) of the Tax Reform Act of 1986 changed the name of the Code from the "1954" Code to the "1986" Code. The Internal Revenue Code is also separately published as title 26 of the United States Code.

Regarding the legal status of the United States Statutes at Large, 1 U.S.C. § 112 provides (in part, with italics added):

The Archivist of the United States shall cause to be compiled, edited, indexed, and published, the United States Statutes at Large, which shall contain all the laws and concurrent resolutions enacted during each regular session of Congress; all proclamations by the President in the numbered series issued since the date of the adjournment of the regular session of Congress next preceding; and also any amendments to the Constitution of the United States proposed or ratified pursuant to article V thereof since that date, together with the certificate of the Archivist of the United States issued in compliance with the provision contained in section 106b of this title. [ . . . ] The United States Statutes at Large shall be legal evidence of laws, concurrent resolutions, treaties, international agreements other than treaties, proclamations by the President, and proposed or ratified amendments to the Constitution of the United States therein contained, in all the courts of the United States, the several States, and the Territories and insular possessions of the United States.

In the case of Ryan v. Bilby, the taxpayer, Dennis Ryan, had been convicted of failure to file tax returns. He therefore sued the district court judge, the prosecutor, his own attorney, two magistrates, and the IRS agents in the case. Ryan's lawsuit was thrown out. He then appealed to the United States Court of Appeals for the Ninth Circuit, which ruled against Ryan and stated:

Ryan's primary contention on appeal is that, as Congress has never enacted Title 26 of the United States Code into positive law, the defendants violated his constitutional rights by attempting to enforce it. [footnote omitted] Thus, he concludes, the district court erred by dismissing his suit. This contention is frivolous. Congress's failure to enact a title [of the United States Code] into positive law has only evidentiary significance and does not render the underlying enactment invalid or unenforceable. See 1 U. S. C. §204(a) (1982) (the text of titles not enacted into positive law is only prima facie evidence of the law itself). Like it or not, the Internal Revenue Code is the law, and the defendants did not violate Ryan's rights by enforcing it.

The Court of Appeals imposed penalties on Mr. Ryan under 28 U.S.C. section 1912, in the form of ordering him to pay double costs, for filing a frivolous appeal.

Similarly, in Young v. Internal Revenue Service, the U.S. District Court for the Northern District of Indiana stated:

Plaintiff [the taxpayer, Jerry L. Young] asserts that the Internal Revenue Code does not apply to him. The basis for this claim is not easily found in the complaint. According to "plaintiff's answer to the court in re of defendant's pleadings," "It is a Fact that the Internal Revenue Code is NOT Positive [sic] Law. That U. S. C. Title 26 has NEVER been passed by Congress." (Emphasis in original).

The only support that the court can find for this argument amongst plaintiff's numerous filings is a letter dated May 7, 1981 from the American Law Division of the Congressional Research Service (plaintiff's Exhibit 7). That letter does say that the Internal Revenue Code of 1954 "was not enacted by Congress as a title of the U. S. Code." But this does not in any way support plaintiff's argument that the Internal Revenue Code is not positive law. First, that very same letter, in the very same sentence, states that "the Internal Revenue Code of 1954 is positive law . . .." Second, although Congress did not pass the Code as a title, it did enact the Internal Revenue Code as a separate Code, see Act of August 16, 1954, 68A Stat. 1, which was then denominated as Title 26 by the House Judiciary Committee pursuant to 1 U. S. C. §202(a). Finally, even if Title 26 was not itself enacted into positive law, that does not mean that the laws under that title are null and void. A law listed in the current edition of the United States Code is prima facie evidence of the law of the United States. See 1 U. S. C. §204(a). As the letter offered by the plaintiff points out, "The courts could require proof of the underlying statutes when a law is in a title of the code which has not been enacted into positive law." In short, this court has the discretion to recognize the Internal Revenue Code as the applicable law, or require proof of the underlying statute.

Consistent with that discretion, this court recognizes that the Internal Revenue Code is positive law applicable to disputes concerning whether taxes are owned by someone like the plaintiff. This court refuses to embrace the plaintiff's position that the tax laws of the United States are some kind of hoax designed by the IRS to violate the constitutional rights of United States citizens. Quite simply, the court finds plaintiff's position preposterous.

Similarly, in United States v. McLain, the U.S. District Court for the District of Minnesota stated:

[The taxpayer, Frances] McLain also contends that the Internal Revenue Code of 1954 is prima facie evidence of the law on which Title 26 is based. Docket No. 163 at 4. McLain is incorrect. The Internal Revenue Code of 1954 was enacted into positive law in the form of a separate code and, as amended, is the authoritative statement of the law. 1 U.S.C. § 204(a) & note; ch. 736, 68A Stat. 3, 3 (1954); Pub. L. No. 99-514, 100 Stat. 2085, 2095 (1986) (stating that the Internal Revenue Title enacted in 1954, as amended, may be cited as the Internal Revenue Code of 1986); Tax Analysts v. IRS, 214 F.3d 179, 182 n.1 (D.C. Cir. 2000). Moreover, while McLain is technically correct in arguing that Title 26 is merely prima facie evidence of the law, the distinction is largely academic because the relevant sections of Title 26 are identical to the relevant sections of the Internal Revenue Code.

Similarly, the United States Court of Appeals for the Tenth Circuit has rejected the argument that "the Internal Revenue Code has not been enacted into 'positive law'".

Some tax protesters have actually argued that the Internal Revenue Code itself says that the Code has "no legal effect." The courts have rejected this argument as well, and have imposed penalties for making this argument.

The argument that the Internal Revenue Code is not "law," the argument that the Internal Revenue Code is not "positive law", the argument that nothing in the Internal Revenue Code imposes a requirement to file a return or pay tax, and similar arguments, have been identified as frivolous arguments for purposes of the $5,000 penalty for taking a frivolous position on a tax return.

=== Specific Code provisions ===
Although the specific statutes imposing an income tax may be generally unknown to persons other than tax lawyers, certified public accountants, enrolled agents and other tax specialists, such statutes exist. Internal Revenue Code sections 1 (26 U.S.C. § 1) (relating to individuals, estates and trusts) and 11 (26 U.S.C. § 11) (relating to corporations) are examples of statutes that expressly impose an income tax on "taxable income" (with section 1(a), for example, expressly using the phrase "[t]here is hereby imposed on the taxable income of [ . . . ]" and section 11 stating: "A tax is hereby imposed for each taxable year on the taxable income of every corporation."). The term "taxable income" is in turn defined in section 63 (26 U.S.C. § 63) with reference to "gross income" which in turn is defined in 26 U.S.C. § 61.

In Holywell Corp. v. Smith, the United States Supreme Court (in a unanimous case) stated the legal significance of 26 U.S.C. § 6151:

The Internal Revenue Code ties the duty to pay federal income taxes to the duty to make an income tax return. See 26 U.S.C. 6151(a) ('when a return of a tax is required . . . the person required to make such return shall . . . pay such tax').

Regarding civil monetary penalties for failure to timely pay taxes, 26 U.S.C. § 6651(a)(2) states (in part):

In case of failure—

[ . . . ]

(2) to pay the amount shown on tax on any return specified in paragraph (1) on or before the date prescribed for payment of such tax (determined with regard to any extension of time for payment), unless it is shown that such failure is due to reasonable cause and not due to willful neglect, there shall be added to the amount shown as tax on such return 0.5 percent of the amount of such tax if the failure is for not more than 1 month, with an additional 0.5 percent for each additional month or fraction thereof during which such failure continues, not exceeding 25 percent in the aggregate [ . . . ]

Regarding Federal income tax returns for single (unmarried) individuals, 26 U.S.C. § 6012 provides (in part):

Returns with respect to income taxes under subtitle A shall be made by the following: [ . . . ]

(A) Every individual having for the taxable year gross income which equals or exceeds the exemption amount, except that a return shall not be required of an individual—

(i) who is not married (determined by applying section 7703), is not a surviving spouse (as defined in section 2 (a)), is not a head of a household (as defined in section 2 (b)), and for the taxable year has gross income of less than the sum of the exemption amount plus the basic standard deduction applicable to such an individual [ . . . ]

Further provisions of section 6012 refer to tax return filings for other individual taxpayers (e.g., married persons filing joint returns, surviving spouses, heads of household, married persons filing separate returns) as well as for other entities such as corporations, estates, and trusts. See also 26 U.S.C. § 6011.

Civil monetary penalties for failure to timely file tax returns (denominated as "additions" to tax) are mentioned at 26 U.S.C. § 6651(a)(1). Under 26 U.S.C. § 6061, with specified, limited exceptions, "any return [ . . .] required to be made under any provision of the internal revenue laws or regulations shall be signed in accordance with forms or regulations prescribed by the Secretary" (emphasis added). The Treasury Regulations indicate that the individual's Federal income tax return must be filed on "Form 1040," "Form 1040A," etc.

Criminal penalties for willful failure to timely file tax returns or pay taxes are mentioned at 26 U.S.C. § 7203:

Any person required under this title to pay any estimated tax or tax, or required by this title or by regulations made under authority thereof to make a return, keep any records, or supply any information, who willfully fails to pay such estimated tax or tax, make such return, keep such records, or supply such information, at the time or times required by law or regulations, shall, in addition to other penalties provided by law, be guilty of a misdemeanor and, upon conviction thereof, shall be fined not more than $25,000 ($100,000 in the case of a corporation), or imprisoned not more than 1 year, or both, together with the costs of prosecution [ . . . ]

Under 26 U.S.C. § 7206:

Any person who—

(1) Declaration under penalties of perjury

Willfully makes and subscribes any return, statement, or other document, which contains or is verified by a written declaration that it is made under the penalties of perjury, and which he does not believe to be true and correct as to every material matter; or

(2) Aid or assistance

Willfully aids or assists in, or procures, counsels, or advises the preparation or presentation under, or in connection with any matter arising under, the internal revenue laws, of a return, affidavit, claim, or other document, which is fraudulent or is false as to any material matter, whether or not such falsity or fraud is with the knowledge or consent of the person authorized or required to present such return, affidavit, claim, or document; or [ . . . ]

(A) Concealment of property

Conceals from any officer or employee of the United States any property belonging to the estate of a taxpayer or other person liable in respect of the tax, or

(B) Withholding, falsifying, and destroying records

Receives, withholds, destroys, mutilates, or falsifies any book, document, or record, or makes any false statement, relating to the estate or financial condition of the taxpayer or other person liable in respect of the tax;

shall be guilty of a felony and, upon conviction thereof, shall be fined not more than $100,000 ($500,000 in the case of a corporation), or imprisoned not more than 3 years, or both, together with the costs of prosecution.

See also 26 U.S.C. § 7207 and 18 U.S.C. § 1001.

The Federal tax evasion statute follows the language of statutory provisions such as Code section 1 (the imposition statute for the individual income tax), with both statutes using the word "imposed":

Any person who willfully attempts in any manner to evade or defeat any tax imposed by this title or the payment thereof shall, in addition to other penalties provided by law, be guilty of a felony and, upon conviction thereof, shall be fined not more than $100,000 ($500,000 in the case of a corporation), or imprisoned not more than 5 years, or both, together with the costs of prosecution.

=== The "show me the law" argument ===
Some tax protesters such as Edward Brown and tax protester organizations such as the We the People Foundation have used the phrase "show me the law" to argue that the Internal Revenue Service refuses to disclose the laws that impose the legal obligation to file Federal income tax returns or pay Federal income taxes—and to argue that there must be no law imposing Federal income taxes.

The official Internal Revenue Service web site contains references to specific code sections and case law, including 26 U.S.C. § 6011 (duty to file returns in general); 26 U.S.C. § 6012 (duty to file income tax returns in particular); and 26 U.S.C. § 6151 (duty to pay tax at time return is required to be filed) and 26 U.S.C. § 61 (definition of gross income) and 26 U.S.C. § 6072 (timing of duty to file).

The year 2007 instruction book for Form 1040, U.S. Individual Income Tax Return, on page 83, contains references to 26 U.S.C. § 6001 (relating to record keeping); 26 U.S.C. § 6011 (general filing requirement); 26 U.S.C. § 6012(a) (specific income tax return filing requirement); and 26 U.S.C. § 6109 (duty to supply identification numbers).

The IRS web site includes a section on tax protester arguments with citations to statutes (including the 26 U.S.C. § 6151 duty to pay the tax) and court decisions and a page with a link to the entire Internal Revenue Code as published by the Legal Information Institute at Cornell University Law School.

A related argument that has been raised is that the taxpayer may not be penalized for tax evasion unless the taxpayer knows that section 7201 is the specific section of the Internal Revenue Code that criminalizes the conduct. The United States Court of Appeals for the Seventh Circuit has rejected this argument as "frivolous," and has stated:

[ . . . ] a person may be convicted of tax offenses only if he knows that the [Internal Revenue] Code requires him to pay. The jury was so instructed, and its verdict shows that it found, beyond a reasonable doubt, that Patridge [the taxpayer] knew that he had to pay taxes on what he made from his business. It is scarcely possible to imagine otherwise: the system of offshore trusts, and the fictive "loans," show that Patridge was trying to hide income that he knew to be taxable. Why else all this folderol? Yet Patridge, in common with many other people who know what the law requires, could not say just which provisions of the Code make income taxable and prevent evasion. For that matter, many tax lawyers (and most judges) could not rattle off the citations without glancing at a book. This shortcoming of memory (perhaps, for Patridge, a deliberate avoidance of knowledge) prevents criminal punishment, [the lawyer for Patridge] insists. But why would this be so? No statute says it; no opinion holds it. [ . . . Section] 7201 makes only "willful" tax evasion criminal. An act is willful for the purpose of tax law [ . . . ] when the taxpayer knows what the Code requires[,] yet sets out to foil the system. Knowledge of the law's demands does not depend on knowing the citation[,] any more than ability to watch a program on TV depends on knowing the frequency on which the signal is broadcast.

The argument that an individual does not owe federal income tax because the Internal Revenue Service has failed to identify any federal taxing statute has been rejected by the U.S. Tax Court, and has been ruled to be frivolous.

=== Demanding an explanation of tax obligations ===
A variation on the "show me the law" argument, the "there is no law requiring an income tax" argument, and the "IRS refuses to say what law makes U.S. citizens liable for income tax" argument is the contention that the IRS has an affirmative duty to respond to taxpayer demands for an answer as to why taxpayers must pay income taxes. This argument is based on tax protester theories about both constitutional law and statutory law, but the constitutional and statutory arguments will be described together here for purposes of presentation.

Some tax protesters claim the following language from a court decision in Schulz v. Internal Revenue Service (2005) means that a taxpayer has a due process right to demand a response from the IRS as to why he or she is subject to taxation:

. . .absent an effort to seek enforcement through a federal court, IRS summonses apply no force to taxpayers, and no consequence whatever can befall a taxpayer who refuses, ignores, or otherwise does not comply with an IRS summons until that summons is backed by a federal court order. . . . any individual subject to [such a court order] must be given a reasonable opportunity to comply and cannot be held in contempt, arrested, detained, or otherwise punished for refusing to comply with the original IRS summons, no matter the taxpayer's reasons, or lack of reasons for so refusing."

The taxpayer Robert L. Schulz filed motions in a federal court to quash administrative summonses issued by the IRS seeking testimony and documents in connection with an IRS investigation. The court in Schulz did not rule that a taxpayer has a right to have the IRS explain why he or she is subject to taxation, and that issue was not presented to the court. The Court of Appeals for the Second Circuit affirmed the dismissal of the taxpayer's motions for a lack of subject matter jurisdiction because there was no actual case or controversy as required by Article III of the Constitution. The court reasoned that the summonses posed no threat of injury to the taxpayer, as the IRS had not yet initiated enforcement proceedings against him. In other words, the taxpayer was not entitled to a court order to quash the summonses until the IRS went to court to demand that he comply with the summons or otherwise face sanctions—something the IRS had not yet done. Once the IRS took that action, the taxpayer would then have ample opportunity to challenge the validity of the summonses.

The court was emphasizing that the law requires the IRS to use the judicial process to punish lack of compliance with an administrative summons; the summons is not self-enforcing. This is true of any government request where the citizen is free to ignore the request until the government brings enforcement action. Courts adjudicate only actual controversies. In the Schulz case the court left open the possibility that the IRS might decide to drop the investigation and never enforce the summonses, or that the plaintiff might voluntarily comply with the request. Until the IRS took the taxpayer to court, the injury was merely "hypothetical."

While there is disagreement over exactly how "imminent" an injury has to be before a taxpayer can obtain relief from a court, this is separate from the obligation to timely file a tax return (which is imposed by statute). The Schulz court did not rule that the IRS was required to "explain" to the taxpayer why he had to pay taxes, but rather that the taxpayer could not obtain a court order to quash the summonses until the IRS first went to court against him. Additionally, the taxpayer was challenging requests for documents and testimony for an investigation (similar to challenging a subpoena or warrant), not demanding that the IRS explain to him why he was subject to taxation. The court did not rule that a taxpayer has no obligation to respond to a summons until the IRS undertakes proceedings against the taxpayer. The court essentially ruled that the taxpayer cannot be punished for failing to comply until the taxpayer has violated a court order mandating compliance.

A subsequent attempt by taxpayer Robert L. Schulz to obtain a court order quashing an IRS "third party" summons issued to the internet payment service known as PayPal was rejected by a Federal court in June 2006.

In a separate case, Schulz and his We the People Foundation organization argued unsuccessfully that, based on the First Amendment right of the people to petition the government for a redress of grievances, the government should have a duty to respond to a taxpayer's demand for an explanation as to why taxpayers are subject to income tax. On May 8, 2007, the Schulz argument was rejected by the United States Court of Appeals for the District of Columbia Circuit in We the People Foundation, Inc. v. United States.

On August 9, 2007, the United States District Court for the Northern District of New York issued an order including an injunction permanently barring Schulz and his We the People Foundation from (1) advising or instructing persons or entities that they are not required to file federal tax returns or pay federal taxes; (2) selling or furnishing any materials purporting to enable individuals to discontinue or stop withholding or paying federal taxes; (3) instructing, advising or assisting anyone to stop withholding or stop paying federal employment or income taxes; and (4) obstructing or advising anyone to obstruct IRS examinations, collections, or other IRS proceedings.

=== The "income taxes are voluntary" argument ===
Some tax protesters argue that filing of Federal income tax returns or payment of taxes is "voluntary" (in the sense of "not a legal obligation") based on language in the text of numerous court cases, such as the following: "Our system of taxation is based upon voluntary assessment and payment, not upon distraint" (from the U.S. Supreme Court case of Flora v. United States.)

Protesters cite documents that, they argue, stress the voluntary nature of taxes:

The taxpayer must be liable for the tax. Tax liability is a condition precedent to the demand. Merely demanding payment, even repeatedly, does not cause liability... For the condition precedent of liability to be met, there must be a lawful assessment, either a voluntary one by the taxpayer, or one procedurally proper, by the IRS. Because this country's income tax system is based on voluntary assessment, rather than distraint [levy by distress], the Service may assess the tax only in certain circumstances and in conformity with proper procedures.

— Bothke v. Fluor Engineers & Construction, Inc., 713 F.2d 1405 (9th Cir. 1983)

Our tax system is based on individual self assessment and voluntary compliance.

— Mortimer Caplin, IRS Commissioner, 1975 Internal Revenue Audit Manual

The IRS's primary task is to collect taxes under a voluntary compliance system.

— Jerome Kurtz, IRS Commissioner, 1980 Internal Revenue Annual Report

Let's not forget the delicate nature of the voluntary compliance tax system...

— Lawrence Gibbs, IRS Commissioner, Las Vegas Review Journal, May 18, 1988

Let me point this out now: Your income tax is 100 percent voluntary tax, and your liquor tax is 100 percent enforced tax. Now, the situation is as different as night and day.

— Dwight E. Avis, head of the Alcohol and Tobacco Tax Division, Bureau of Internal Revenue, testifying before the Ways and Means Committee during the Eighty-Third Congress in 1953

In Flora, the Supreme Court ruled that a Federal District Court does not have subject matter jurisdiction to hear a lawsuit by a taxpayer for a Federal income tax refund where the taxpayer has not paid the entire amount assessed (the rule, known as the Flora full payment rule, does not apply to U.S. Tax Court cases or bankruptcy cases). Tax protesters sometimes cite the language in cases like Flora for the contention that filing of tax returns and paying taxes is not legally required, i.e., that the filing of returns and paying of taxes is, in that sense, "voluntary".

In the Flora case the taxpayer did not contend, and the court did not rule, that there was no legal obligation to file Federal income tax returns or pay the related taxes. The Court's ruling in Flora was almost the opposite: the taxpayer was required to pay the full amount of tax claimed by the IRS to be owed by the taxpayer before the court would even hear a lawsuit by the taxpayer against the government to determine the correct amount of tax.

The quoted language from Flora refers to the Federal income tax: "Our system of taxation is based upon voluntary assessment and payment, not upon distraint." The key words are "voluntary" and "distraint." Like many legal terms, "voluntary" has more than one legal meaning. In the context of the quoted sentence, the income tax is voluntary in that the person bearing the economic burden of the tax is the one required to compute (assess) the amount of tax and file the related tax return. In this sense, a state sales tax is not a voluntary tax - i.e., the purchaser of the product does not compute the tax or file the related tax return. The store at which he or she bought the product computes the sales tax, charges the customer, collects the tax from him at the time of sale, prepares and files a monthly or quarterly sales tax return and remits the money to the taxing authority.

In Flora, the Court used the word "voluntary" in opposition to the word "distraint." Distraint is a legal term used in various contexts. For example, distraint is used to refer to the act of a landlord who withholds property of the tenant already in the landlord's possession to secure payment of past due rent. The property "held for ransom," in a sense, is said to be "distrained," or "distressed." The key connotation of the word "distraint" is that there is often a taking of possession or withholding of property to induce a debtor to pay an obligation. Once the debt is paid, the property is released.

By contrast, the Internal Revenue Service does not seize the property of taxpayers each January to induce taxpayers to file a tax return and pay the tax by April 15. The IRS relies on "voluntary" compliance as the term is used in this sense.

In the separate sense of the word "voluntary" in which some tax protesters use the term, the obligation to pay the tax and file the return is not voluntary—for either income tax or sales tax. For example, the Internal Revenue Code is full of statutes specifically imposing the obligation to file returns and pay taxes, and imposing civil and criminal penalties for willful failure to do so on a timely basis (see above). The difference is that in the case of the income tax, the taxpayer files the return, whereas in the case of the sales tax, the seller (not the customer) files the return.

Likewise, the word "assessment" has more than one tax law meaning. In the quote from Flora the term "assessment" does not refer to a statutory assessment by the Internal Revenue Service under 26 U.S.C. § 6201 and 26 U.S.C. § 6322 and other statutes (i.e., a formal recordation of the tax on the books and records of the United States Department of the Treasury). The term is instead used in the sense in which the taxpayer himself or herself "assesses" or computes his or her own tax in the process of preparing a tax return, prior to filing the return.

Similarly, the word "deficiency" has more than one technical meaning under the Internal Revenue Code: one kind of "deficiency" for purposes of 26 U.S.C. § 6211 relating to statutory notices of deficiency, U.S. Tax Court cases, etc. (meaning, usually, the excess of the amount that the IRS claims is the correct tax over the amount the taxpayer claims is the correct tax—both computed without regard to how much of that tax has been paid) as opposed to another kind of "deficiency" for purposes of the case law under the tax evasion and other criminal statutes (meaning, essentially, the amount of unpaid tax actually owed). Tax law, like other areas of law, is replete with words like "voluntary," "assessment," and "deficiency" that have varying meanings depending on the varying legal contexts in which those terms are used.

With respect to the use of the term "voluntary," no court has ever ruled that there is no legal obligation under the Internal Revenue Code of 1986 to timely file Federal income tax returns or to timely pay Federal income taxes.

=== Failure to file tax return ===
Another argument that has been raised is the theory that the federal income tax cannot be assessed against an individual who has not filed the related federal income tax return. This argument was rejected in Carroll v. United States.

=== Formal assessment of tax ===
Some tax protesters have argued that the tax must be formally assessed (officially recorded, under section 6203 of the Internal Revenue Code, on the books of the office of the U.S. Secretary of the Treasury) by the Internal Revenue Service before a federal tax liability can exist. No court has upheld this argument. Internal Revenue Code section 6151(a) provides that:

when a return of tax is required under this title or regulations, the person required to make such return shall, without assessment or notice and demand from the Secretary [of the Treasury or his delegate], pay such tax to the internal revenue officer with whom the return is filed, and shall pay such tax at the time and place fixed for filing the return [ . . . ]

The argument that no tax is owed unless the tax is first officially assessed by the IRS was specifically rejected by the United States Court of Appeals for the Second Circuit, which cited section 6151(a), in United States v. Ellett, citing United States v. Daniel, United States v. Hogan, and United States v. Dack.

Similarly, under the U.S. Bankruptcy Code, there is no requirement that an otherwise valid federal tax be officially assessed to be considered valid in bankruptcy. Indeed, until the enactment of the Bankruptcy Reform Act of 1994, the section 362(a)(6) prohibition on assessment without prior court approval applied to valid pre-petition taxes. With the 1994 Act, that restriction was eliminated by an amendment to section 362(b)(9), which now provides that although the taxing authority may assess a valid pre-petition tax without first obtaining court approval, a tax lien that would otherwise arise after the assessment will have no effect until certain specified events occur. By contrast, there is no requirement that the IRS assess the tax in order for the tax to be considered a valid legal claim in the bankruptcy (i.e., in the absence of a tax lien securing the tax, an unassessed tax can be classified as a valid priority unsecured claim under 11 U.S.C. § 507 or a valid general unsecured claim, as applicable).

The argument that a person is not required to file a tax return or pay tax unless the Internal Revenue Service responds to the person's questions, etc., and variations of this argument, have been officially identified as legally frivolous Federal tax return positions for purposes of the $5,000 frivolous tax return penalty imposed under Internal Revenue Code section 6702(a).

=== Implementing regulations ===
Another argument made by tax protesters is that a given section of the statute (i.e., a given section of the Internal Revenue Code) must be supported by an implementing regulation for that particular section in order for that section to be legally valid, or that the lack of an implementing regulation for that section makes that section unenforceable. This argument has been uniformly rejected by the courts.

== Argument that acquittal in a criminal tax case proves there is no law imposing tax liability ==
One tax protester argument is that the acquittal of a defendant in a Federal criminal tax case proves that there is no law imposing the Federal income tax liability, or that the acquittal relieves the defendant of liability for the Federal income tax. No court has accepted this argument.

One well-known example of the continuing tax problems for acquitted defendants is the case of Vernice Kuglin, who was acquitted in her year 2003 criminal trial on charges of Federal income tax evasion. Kuglin's tax problems were not negated by her acquittal, and in 2004 she entered a settlement with the government in which she agreed to pay over $500,000 in taxes and penalties. On April 30, 2007, the Memphis Daily News reported that Kuglin's tax problems continued with the filing of a Notice of Federal Tax Lien against her assets in the amount of $188,025. The Memphis newspaper also stated that Kuglin had "given up her fight against paying taxes, according to a Sept. 10, 2004, Commercial Appeal story."

== Arguments about the amount to be taxed ==
Some protesters have argued that tax should be based on amounts other than the amount of money or the fair market value of property or services received.

=== Value of gold or silver coins ===
Some people have argued that with respect to the receipt of gold or silver coins, taxpayers need only report as income the "face value," and not the higher actual fair market value, of the coins. In the Joslin case, the United States Court of Appeals for the Tenth Circuit ruled that under 26 U.S.C. § 61 and 26 C.F.R. 1.61-2(d)(1), a taxpayer who bargains to be paid for his services in legal tender (in this case, silver dollar coins) must report the income at the fair market value (numismatic value), and not at the lower face value. Similarly, in the Cordner case, the United States Court of Appeals for the Ninth Circuit ruled that a taxpayer who receives Double Eagle gold coins as a distribution from a corporation must report as income the fair market value of the coins, not the lower face value. In this case, where a coin, by reason of its value to collectors or by reason of the intrinsic worth of its contents, has a fair market value in excess of its face value, it is treated as "property other than money" for purposes of 26 U.S.C. § 301, resulting in taxation at fair market value.

The Ninth Circuit Court has ruled that under 26 U.S.C. § 1001, in the exchange of Swiss francs for U.S. Double Eagle gold coins, the taxpayer is taxed at the aggregate fair market value, and not the lower face value. In this case, the taxpayer and the government argued about whether the Double Eagle coin was legal tender. The court stated that it would not have to decide the issue. The court stated: "Because the key element is the excess of market value over face value, it is immaterial that such coins may be legal tender at their face value."

In still another case, a taxpayer's argument – that gold and silver coins should, for Federal income tax purposes, be valued at their face value, while foreign coins, in general, should be valued according to their precious metal content – was rejected. The court stated: "Coins which are not currently circulating legal tender are property to be valued at their fair market value for purposes of section 1001(b) ... This result is unaffected by the fact that such coins may still be used as legal tender at their face value."

Taxpayers have attempted to argue that the Cordner Doctrine (see above) should not apply where the coins remain in circulation, as the coins in the Cordner case (gold coins) had been withdrawn from circulation. This argument has been rejected. In the Stoecklin case, the court ruled that the taxpayer who receives coins (in this case, silver dollar coins) as compensation for services is taxed at the fair market value of the coins, not the lower face value, regardless of whether or not the coins have been withdrawn from circulation. Similarly, in the case of United States v. Kahre, the criminal defendants’ arguments – that where gold or silver coins are currently circulating, the taxpayer may report the coins as income at their face value and not at the higher fair market value – were rejected. The Kahre case also made news because although the defendants lost their argument that the receipt of circulating coins could be taxed at the lower face value, the defendants were not convicted of the criminal charges against them, with the main defendant drawing a hung jury. Kahre was later convicted and is currently serving a 15-year sentence in a federal penitentiary.

== The 861 argument ==
The 861 argument refers to Internal Revenue Code section 861, entitled "Income from sources within the United States". This provision delineates what kinds of income shall be treated as income from sources within the United States when taxes are assessed of resident aliens, nonresident aliens, and foreign corporations. The provision does not apply to U.S. citizens, but the language of Section 861 is occasionally cited by tax protesters who claim that the statute excludes some portion of the income of U.S. citizens and resident aliens from taxation under the provisions of the Code.

Courts have uniformly held this interpretation to be incorrect, and proponents of the argument who have used it as a basis for not paying taxes have been penalized and even jailed. For example, actor Wesley Snipes was found guilty on three misdemeanor counts of failing to file Federal income tax returns, although he was acquitted of charges to conspire to defraud the US government. He was sentenced to three years in prison. Snipes has appealed that conviction.

== Arguing the law in court ==
One contention by some tax protesters is that a taxpayer should be allowed to introduce, as evidence in court, copies of statutes, cases or other materials to persuade the jury about what the law is. Courts do not allow this procedure as, under the U.S. legal system, the general rule is that neither side in a civil or criminal case is allowed to try to prove to the jury what the law is. For example, in a murder case the defendant is not allowed to persuade the jury that there is no law against murder, or to try to interpret the law for the jury. Likewise, the prosecution is not allowed to do this. Instead, disagreements about what the law is are argued by both sides before the judge, who then makes a ruling. Prior to jury deliberations, the judge instructs the jury on the law. Examples of applications of this rule in tax controversies are United States v. Ambort, United States v. Bonneau, and United States v. Willie.

In a criminal tax case, a taxpayer is allowed to present evidence about what the taxpayer believes the law to be—but only in an attempt to demonstrate, as a defense, an actual good faith belief based on a misunderstanding caused by the complexity of the tax law, not to try to persuade the jury that the taxpayer's belief is correct. An actual good faith belief based on a misunderstanding caused by the complexity of the tax law negates the "willfulness" requirement for a conviction (see Cheek v. United States).

== See also ==
- Tax protester history in the United States
- Taxation in the United States
