= Tax protester arguments =

Tax protester arguments are arguments made by people, primarily in the United States, who contend that tax laws are unconstitutional or otherwise invalid.

Tax protester arguments are typically based on an asserted belief that their government is acting outside of its legal authority when imposing such taxes. The label "tax protester" should be distinguished from "tax resister", an individual who refuses to pay tax on moral rather than legal grounds.

In the United States, tax protester arguments are generally directed to the U.S. federal income tax.

== Denial of tax liability ==
Arguments made by tax protesters generally deal with the U.S. federal income tax and not with other taxes such as the gift tax, estate tax, sales tax, and property tax (although some tax protesters have attacked the last category under allodial title claims).

=== Constitutional arguments ===
Some tax protesters may cite what they believe is evidence that the Sixteenth Amendment (removing any apportionment requirement for income taxes) was never "properly ratified" or that it was properly ratified but does not permit the taxation of individual income, or particular forms of individual income. One argument is based on the contention that the legislatures of various states passed bills of ratification with different capitalization, spelling of words, or punctuation marks (e.g., semicolons instead of commas) (see, e.g., United States v. Thomas).

Another argument made by some tax protesters is that because the United States Congress did not pass an official proclamation recognizing Ohio's 1803 admission to statehood until 1953 (see Ohio Constitution), Ohio was not a state until 1953 and therefore the Sixteenth Amendment was not properly ratified (see Ivey v. United States and Knoblauch v. Commissioner in the referenced article).

Another tax protester argument is that the manner in which the income tax is enforced violates the Fifth Amendment, which protects individuals from having to make self-incriminating statements. In particular, they argue that the Fifth Amendment protects individuals from being required to file a personal income tax return. This argument was ruled invalid by the United States Supreme Court in the case of United States v. Sullivan.

The argument is occasionally made that Federal Reserve Notes (paper money) are not real, lawful money and therefore do not constitute income as they are not backed by gold or silver and are issued by a quasi-private organization; in the case of the Posse Comitatus and similar groups and individuals, hybrid arguments incorporating elements of the below-mentioned conspiracy theories appear to predominate.

=== Statutory arguments ===
Some protesters have claimed that statutes enacted by the United States Congress pursuant to its constitutional taxing power are defective, invalid (see e.g., the Irwin Schiff quote below), or that the statutes are misapplied by the Internal Revenue Service (IRS), the courts, lawyers, Certified Public Accountants (CPAs), law professors, and legal experts generally, and that the tax "protesters" are not liable for tax under the law (see below). Other protesters have argued that the term "income" is not defined in the Internal Revenue Code or the Constitution, and that the tax law should therefore be invalid.

These protesters claim that without clear definitions, Chapter 1 of Title 26 of the Code of Federal Regulations suggests IRS agents must rely on voluntary compliance. No court has upheld this argument, and many courts have rejected it, and 26 U.S.C. §§ 61–64 does define various classes of income ("Gross income", "[a]djusted gross income", "[t]axable income", and "[o]rdinary income defined").

=== Conspiracy arguments ===
Some tax protesters claim that since the year 1913 (the year of the inception of the modern Federal income tax), several generations of IRS employees, Department of Justice employees, the United States Congress, Federal court judges, lawyers, certified public accountants, and other experts have engaged in various continuing conspiracies to conceal the above deficiencies. For example, convicted tax offender Irwin Schiff states on his web site:

In 1986, 99.5 million Americans were tricked into filing and paying federal income taxes when, legally, they didn't have to do either. If this statement shocks you, it is only because you and the rest of the nation have been thoroughly deceived by the federal government (with federal courts playing the key role), and an army of accountants, lawyers, and other tax preparers. All of these have a vested interest in keeping you ignorant concerning the real nature of federal income taxes. ... [N]o provision of the Internal Revenue Code requires anyone to file or pay income taxes. This tax, unlike other internal revenue taxes, is strictly (censored ~~voluntary~~). ... However, in order to deceive Americans of this, as well as provide federal courts and the IRS with deceptive passages on which to hang illegal prosecutions and illegal seizures, the Internal Revenue Code was written to make paying income taxes appear mandatory. The government succeeded in doing this by tricking the public.

=== Other arguments ===
Some tax protesters argue that an income tax is enforced upon threat of imprisonment, and is akin to "government sanctioned extortion", in which a citizen is forced to give up a percentage of his or her income in exchange for not being put in prison. Strictly speaking, a genuine inability to pay taxes is not a crime (although "willful failure" to pay taxes is a crime). For the most part, unpaid tax bills are settled through civil actions rather than in the criminal courts. The government may seize assets, file liens, garnish wages and pursue other civil legal actions to satisfy the tax debt, but persons may not be jailed simply for failing to pay taxes. Instead, criminal charges arise from closely related actions, such as willfully failing to file a tax return, willfully filing a false tax return, willfully failing to pay in a timely manner, concealing income or assets, and certain other actions constituting illegal tax evasion.

Frank Chodorov wrote "... you come up with the fact that it gives the government a prior lien on all the property produced by its subjects." The government "unashamedly proclaims the doctrine of collectivized wealth. ... That which it does not take is a concession." Issues with civil liberties are also charged at the tax system, such as social inequality, economic inequality, financial privacy, self-incrimination, unreasonable search and seizure, burden of proof, and due process. For these reasons, some argue for the FairTax proposal of implementing a national sales tax to replace the federal income tax.

In the United States, debtor's prison was seen as an inhumane practice, and was mostly abolished in the 19th century. Tax protesters argue that prison for tax evasion is just as inhumane, for the same reasons. One owes a bank or a person, while the other owes the government. Some argue for gentler penalties instead of imprisonment, such as fines, community service, wage garnishment, lien on house, taking tax money owed from a bank account, repossession, and foreclosure, much like the penalties of private or bank debt.

== Position of the Internal Revenue Service ==
The position of the Internal Revenue Service based upon the statutes and upon the related legal precedents in case law, is that these and similar tax protest arguments are frivolous and, if adopted by taxpayers as a basis for failure to timely file tax returns or pay taxes, may subject such taxpayers to penalties. On its web site, the IRS states:

Some [people] assert that they are not required to file federal tax returns because the filing of a tax return is voluntary. Proponents point to the fact that the IRS itself tells taxpayers in the Form 1040 instruction book that the tax system is voluntary. Additionally, the Supreme Court's opinion in Flora v. United States, 362 U.S. 145, 176 (1960), is often quoted for the proposition that "our system of taxation is based upon voluntary assessment and payment, not upon distraint."

The Law: The word "voluntary," as used in Flora and in IRS publications, refers to our system of allowing taxpayers to determine the correct amount of tax and complete the appropriate returns, rather than have the government determine tax for them. The requirement to file an income tax return is not voluntary and is clearly set forth in Internal Revenue Code §§ 6011(a), 6012(a), et seq., and 6072(a). See also Treas. Reg. § 1.6011-1(a).

Any taxpayer who has received more than a statutorily determined amount of gross income is obligated to file a return. Failure to file a tax return could subject the noncomplying individual to criminal penalties, including fines and imprisonment, as well as civil penalties.

As stated in the Alaska District Court case of United States v. Rempel: "It is apparent ... that the defendants have at least had access to some of the publications of tax protester organizations. The publications of these organizations have a bad habit of giving lots of advice without explaining the consequences which can flow from the assertion of totally discredited legal positions and/or meritless factual positions." Commentator J. J. MacNab has stated that tax protester arguments will not work, and that with respect to people who use tax protester arguments, the Internal Revenue Service "will come after you with a passion".

== Belief about the law as a defense in criminal cases ==
In criminal cases, the law distinguishes between beliefs about constitutionality of the tax law from other beliefs about the tax law:

A defendant's good-faith belief that he is not required to file a tax return is a valid defense to the element of willfulness, and the belief need not be reasonable if actually held in good faith. It is not, however, within the prerogative of the taxpayer to make a personalized finding of constitutionality. Thus, a good-faith belief that the tax laws are unconstitutional does not constitute a good-faith defense.

== Works ==
- America: Freedom to Fascism, a film that promotes tax protester arguments
- Zeitgeist: The Movie, another film that promotes tax protester arguments

== See also ==
- Pseudolaw
