= Flora v. United States =

Flora v. United States, 357 U.S. 63 (1958)
- Supreme Court of the United States

Argued May 20, 1958 Decided June 16, 1958
- Full case name: Flora v. United States
- Citations: 357 U.S. 63 (more) 78 S. Ct. 1079; 2 L. Ed. 2d 1165; 1958 U.S. LEXIS 1806

Case history
- Prior: Cert. to the 10th Circuit, 246 F.2d 929 (10th Cir. 1957)
- Subsequent: Affirmed on rehearing, 362 U.S. 145 (1960)

Holding
- A taxpayer must pay the full amount of an income tax deficiency assessed by the Commissioner of Internal Revenue before he may challenge its correctness by a suit in a federal district court for refund under 28 U.S.C. § 1346(a)(1).

Court membership
- Chief Justice Earl Warren Associate Justices Hugo Black · Felix Frankfurter; William O. Douglas · Harold H. Burton; Tom C. Clark · John M. Harlan II; William J. Brennan Jr. · Charles E. Whittaker

Case opinion
- Majority: Warren, joined by unanimous

Flora v. United States, 357 U.S. 63 (1958), affirmed on rehearing, 362 U.S. 145 (1960), was a case in which the Supreme Court of the United States held that a taxpayer generally must pay the full amount of an income tax deficiency assessed by the Commissioner of Internal Revenue before he may challenge its correctness by a suit in a federal district court for refund under 28 U.S.C. § 1346(a)(1). The Supreme Court agreed with the Commissioner of Internal Revenue, stating that the full payment rule requires the entire amount of an asserted deficiency to be paid before a refund suit may be maintained.

== Importance ==
If the taxpayer chooses to pay less than the deficiency asserted, the taxpayer's only remedies are (A) a deficiency proceeding in the Tax Court or, (B) in a bankruptcy case, a determination under section 505(a) of the US Bankruptcy Code. That rule can be a problem for a taxpayer who lets the 90-day period (following the issuance of a statutory notice of deficiency, during which he may file a Tax Court petition) expire and then cannot fully pay because of insufficient assets.

== See also ==
- Chief Justice Warren
- List of United States Supreme Court cases, volume 357
