= Title 31 of the United States Code =

U.S. federal statutes on money and finance

Title 31 of the United States Code outlines the role of the money and finance in the United States Code.

== Legislative history ==
The title was codified September 13, 1982 as "Money and Finance", Pub. L. 97–258, 96 Stat. 877.

== Contents ==
The latest contents, as of Pub. L. 115–35 (text) (PDF) on May 17, 2017.

=== Subtitle I: General ===
- 31 U.S.C. ch. 1: Definitions
- 31 U.S.C. ch. 3: Department of the Treasury
- 31 U.S.C. ch. 5: Office of Management and Budget
- 31 U.S.C. ch. 7: Government Accountability Office
- 31 U.S.C. ch. 9: Agency Chief Financial Officers

=== Subtitle II: The Budget Process ===
- 31 U.S.C. ch. 11: The Budget and Fiscal, Budget, and Program Information
- 31 U.S.C. ch. 13: Appropriations
- 31 U.S.C. ch. 15: Appropriation Accounting

=== Subtitle III: Financial Management ===
- 31 U.S.C. ch. 31: Public Debt
- 31 U.S.C. ch. 33: Depositing, Keeping, and Paying Money
- 31 U.S.C. ch. 35: Accounting and Collecting
- 31 U.S.C. ch. 37: Claims
- 31 U.S.C. ch. 38: Administrative Remedies for False Claims and Statements
- 31 U.S.C. ch. 39: Prompt Payment: this chapter provides for interest penalties where a federal agency does not pay a business concern's invoice by its due date.

=== Subtitle IV: Money ===
- 31 U.S.C. ch. 51: Coins and Currency
  - 31 U.S.C. § 5112: Denominations, specifications, and design of coin
    - 31 U.S.C. § 5112(a)(1): Sacagawea dollar
    - 31 U.S.C. § 5112(e): American Silver Eagle
    - 31 U.S.C. § 5112(l): 50 State Quarters
    - 31 U.S.C. § 5112(n): Presidential $1 Coin Program
    - 31 U.S.C. § 5112(o): Presidential $1 Coin Program#First Spouse Program
- 31 U.S.C. ch. 53: Monetary Transactions

=== Subtitle V: General Assistance Administration ===
- 31 U.S.C. ch. 61: Program Information
- 31 U.S.C. ch. 62: Consolidated Federal Funds Report
- 31 U.S.C. ch. 63: Using Procurement Contracts and Grant and Cooperative Agreements
- 31 U.S.C. ch. 65: Intergovernmental Cooperation
- 31 U.S.C. ch. 67: Federal Payments
- 31 U.S.C. ch. 69: Payment for Entitlement Land
- 31 U.S.C. ch. 71: Joint Funding Simplification
- 31 U.S.C. ch. 73: Administering Block Grants
- 31 U.S.C. ch. 75: Requirements for Single Audits
- 31 U.S.C. ch. 77: Access to Information for Debt Collection

=== Subtitle VI: Miscellaneous ===
- 31 U.S.C. ch. 91: Government Corporations
- 31 U.S.C. ch. 93: Sureties and Surety Bonds
- 31 U.S.C. ch. 95: Government Pension Plan Protection
- 31 U.S.C. ch. 97: Miscellaneous
