= Tax resistance in the United States =

Refusal to pay taxes in the U.S.

Tax resistance in the United States has been practiced at least since colonial times, and has played important parts in American history.

Tax resistance is the refusal to pay a tax, usually by means that bypass established legal norms, as a means of protest, nonviolent resistance, or conscientious objection. It was a core tactic of the American Revolution and has played a role in many struggles in America from colonial times to the present day.

In addition, the philosophy of tax resistance, from the "no taxation without representation" axiom that served as a foundation of the Revolution to the assertion of individual conscience in Henry David Thoreau's Civil Disobedience, has been an important plank of American political philosophy.

== Theory ==
The theory that there should be "no taxation without representation", while it did not originate in America, is often associated with the American Revolution, in which that slogan did strong duty. It continues to be a rallying cry for tax rebellions today. American Henry David Thoreau's theory of civil disobedience has proven to be extremely influential, and its influence today is not limited to tax resistance stands and campaigns but to all manner of refusal to obey unjust laws. These are among the theories of tax resistance that have taken on a particularly American flavor and have animated and inspired American tax resisters and tax resistance campaigns.

=== No taxation without representation ===
In English political philosophy of the late 18th century, the theory was prominent that in order for the sovereign to exact a tax on a population, that population must be represented in a legislature that had the sole power to levy the tax. That theory was made axiomatic in the form of the slogan "no taxation without representation" (and similar expressions).

As the American colonies did not have representation in the British parliament, this axiom became a useful platform for colonial rebels to justify their rebellion against direct taxes imposed by the Crown.

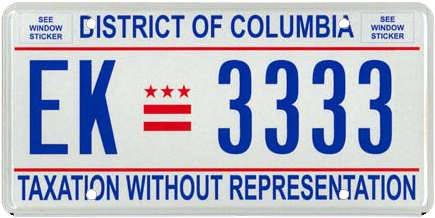
The standard-issue District of Columbia license plate bears the phrase, "Taxation Without Representation".

The "no taxation without representation" slogan was later brought to bear in the arguments for tax resistance by African-Americans and women, as they did not have the right to vote or serve in the legislature. It is used today by the District of Columbia as part of a complaint that residents of the district have no (voting) Congressional representatives.

The phrase has such potent currency in American thought that it is frequently used today in the context of tax debates that have little to do with legislative representation, at least in the way that the original coiners of the phrase would have understood: For example, complaints that Congressional representatives only represent certain special interests, or that the complainer does not feel that his or her point of view is represented in legislative debates or actions.

=== Civil disobedience ===
Henry David Thoreau's 1849 essay On Resistance to Civil Government—now usually referred to as Civil Disobedience—is part of the canon of American political philosophy. It was prompted by Thoreau's refusal to pay a poll tax because of unwillingness to support a government that was enforcing the slavery of Americans and what he felt was an unjust war against Mexico.

Thoreau argued that obedience to government is often misplaced, and that people should develop and trust their own consciences rather than use the law as a crutch.

Thoreau's philosophy has inspired many tax resisters since, especially those who have acted individually (not as part of a tax strike or other large-scale movement) and from motives of conscientious objection.

=== Conscientious objection to military taxation ===
The theory that taxpayers become complicit in the actions of their government when they pay for the government's functioning and requisitions through their taxes, and that therefore one must scrutinize the actions of the government and refuse to pay for them if they become grossly immoral, is key to the war tax resistance practiced by American Quakers since colonial times. It also forms an important philosophical basis for other religious and secular American war tax resisters down to the present day.

War tax resisters in the United States pioneered the idea that conscientious objection to military taxation ought to be a legally protected right: that is, taxpayers who are morally opposed to taking part in war should not be forced to fund war, just as governments often permit such people to avoid military conscription.

This theory has been extended by people who oppose other aspects of government funding. A few have refused to pay taxes on the grounds that some government health spending goes to institutions that provide abortions. A number of Amish people refused to pay taxes for government social insurance programs on conscientious grounds (see below).

=== Taxation as theft ===
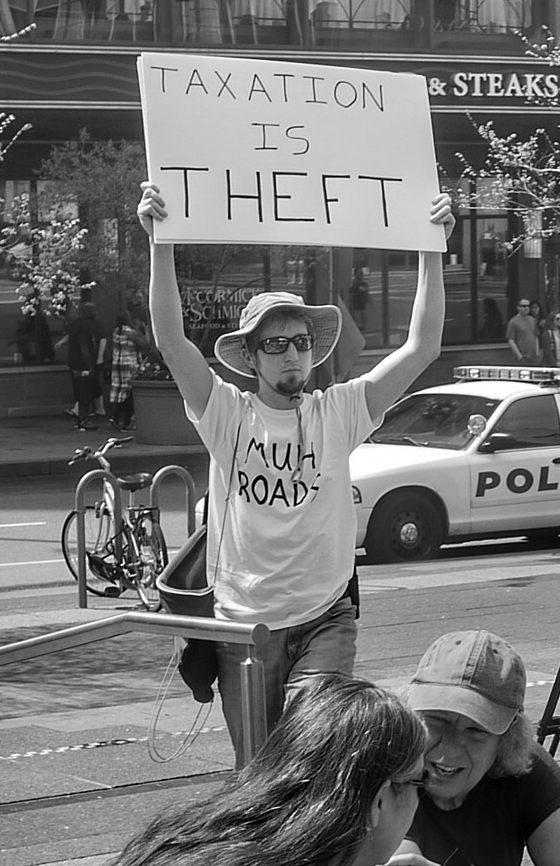
A demonstrator at a "Tax Day" demonstration in Cincinnati, Ohio, holds a sign reading "taxation is theft".

The theory that taxation is ethically indistinguishable from robbery is a staple of American anarchist and (often) libertarian thought. American anarchist philosopher Lysander Spooner put it this way:

Taxation without consent is as plainly robbery, when enforced against one man, as when enforced against millions... Taking a man's money without his consent, is also as much robbery, when it is done by millions of men, acting in concert, and calling themselves a government, as when it is done by a single individual, acting on his own responsibility, and calling himself a highwayman. Neither the numbers engaged in the act, nor the different characters they assume as a cover for the act, alter the nature of the act itself.

— Lysander Spooner, No Treason: The Constitution of No Authority (1869)

The original U.S. Libertarian Party platform (1972) agreed that taxation was always a violation of the rights of the individual:

Since we believe that every man is entitled to keep the fruits of his labor, we are opposed to all government activity which consists of the forcible collection of money or goods from citizens in violation of their individual rights. Specifically, we support the eventual repeal of all taxation. We support a system of voluntary fees for services rendered as a method for financing government in a free society.

=== Tax protester theories ===
An enduring mythology of tax protester arguments asserts that the tax system operating in the United States is unconstitutional, illegal, or does not actually apply to most of the people currently being subjected to it.

These arguments, though they often take the form of "totally discredited legal positions and/or meritless factual positions", are often persuasive to people who have an unsophisticated understanding of the legal system and who are susceptible to look uncritically on arguments that appeal to their financial self-interest. For example, in the early 1980s, an epidemic of tax protest swept General Motors plants in Flint, Michigan, as thousands of employees there told GM to stop withholding income tax from their salaries after they attended seminars or listened to lectures on tape from the tax protester group "We The People ACT".

== Practice ==
The following sections briefly describe some of the more prominent examples of tax resistance in colonial America and the United States:

=== Quaker conscientious objection to military taxation ===
The Society of Friends (Quakers) had a tradition of refusing to pay tithes to the establishment church, and of refusing to pay explicit war taxes, from the early years of the establishment of the sect.

When Quakers were permitted to establish an American colony, Pennsylvania, that they could run to some extent according to their religious principles, the Pennsylvania Assembly often offered some resistance to attempts by the crown to exact money from the colony for the purposes of military defense.

During the French and Indian War, the Pennsylvania colonial assembly conceded, and began raising a tax from Pennsylvania residents for military fortifications. This led to some—including influential Quakers John Woolman and Anthony Benezet—refusing to pay such taxes for reasons of conscientious objection.

This stand, and the eloquence the resisters employed to explain it, proved influential, and a Quaker tradition of war tax resistance has waxed and waned through American history to the present day.

=== Colonial resistance ===
A typical American colonial government was headed by a governor, who was appointed by the Crown and meant to represent the interests of the home country, and a colonial assembly, elected by the colonists themselves. The two not infrequently came into conflict over issues of taxation, and when the governor assumed the right to tax colonists without the consent of their legislature, this conflict might result in tax resistance.

This happened for example in 1687 when New England governor Edmund Andros attempted to assess a new tax. Led by the reverend John Wise, colonists declared their unwillingness to pay such a tax and were imprisoned on orders of the governor. This ultimately led to the 1689 Boston revolt in which Andros was overthrown. This muscle-flexing by American colonists was an important precursor of the American Revolution, such that Ipswich, where a declaration defying the tax was signed, bills itself as "The Birthplace of American Independence 1687".

The War of the Regulation in colonial North Carolina was another important precursor of the American Revolution. Colonists, fed up with what they viewed as a corrupt and unrepresentative colonial government, stopped paying taxes and ultimately rose in an armed revolt. In this case it was the entire government—the governor, the assembly, and the corrupt bureaucracy—that was the target of the rebellion.

Independence-minded colonists used a variety of tactics to increase the economic independence and self-reliance of the colonies while denying economic resources to the Crown. This included rampant smuggling and attacks on British customs ships (as in the Gaspee Affair), the refusal to allow British monopoly products to be brought to market (as in the Boston Tea Party and Philadelphia Tea Party), boycotts of British-manufactured goods and the encouragement of local production of replacement goods, and sanctions ranging from social boycott to violent attacks aimed at tax collectors and collaborators. The success of measures like these led John Adams to assert that the American Revolution had already been accomplished before the Revolutionary War began—that the war was less a revolution than a failed counterrevolution.

=== Resistance in the post-revolutionary period ===
After the success of the American Revolution, the independent United States government of the former colonies was confronted by its own tax resistance campaigns. Three were suppressed militarily by the fledgling United States government:

==== Shays' Rebellion ====
Massachusetts farmers were motivated in part by increased taxes and heavy-handed tax enforcement when they rose up in Shays' Rebellion. They took action against government agencies that were enforcing tax seizures, preventing their operation, until the suppression of the rebellion.

==== The Whiskey Rebellion ====
Farmers far from coastal ports and population centers would often ferment and distill their grain into whiskey locally because it was more economic to bring whiskey to market than grain, from the point of view of transportation costs. Thus, when United States government put an excise tax on whiskey, this was seen as an imposition by coastal elites at the expense of rural farmers and was widely resented and resisted.

While resistance in the form of refusal to pay the excise tax or to cooperate in the enforcement of excise laws persisted and largely succeeded in some areas, in Western Pennsylvania this resistance erupted into attacks on tax collectors and eventual armed revolt—the Whiskey Rebellion—which was violently suppressed by federal government troops under the command of former revolutionary war commander in chief George Washington.

==== Fries's Rebellion ====
Fries's Rebellion began in opposition to a federal window-tax instituted by the Adams administration, with resisters impeding the tax assessors and refusing to pay the assessed taxes. This resistance movement, too, was successfully suppressed by the federal government when it rose to the level of armed rebellion.

=== Native / immigrant conflicts ===
The United States government is largely run by and on behalf of the European immigrant community, while United States territory also encompasses the land of native people, some of whom live in separate sovereign or semi-sovereign nations. Conflicts periodically erupt over who could tax whom.

In the late-19th century, such conflicts led to tax resistance, for example from thousands of people of part-native ancestry in Dakota Territory who forced the tax collector to retreat without his prize, from Crow in Montana who refused to pay for several years until the government there confiscated their livestock, or from non-native residents of Oklahoma Territory who wanted to be free from Cherokee Nation taxes.

Such conflicts continued into the 20th century. For example, Wallace "Mad Bear" Anderson led a tax resistance campaign of the Tuscarora Nation in 1959 in which they refused to pay state income tax, publicly destroyed tax summonses, and engaged in sit-ins and other such protests. Members of the Seneca Nation blocked the Southern Tier Expressway in New York to protest the state's attempt to extend a state sales tax to them in 1992. When members of the Iroquois Confederacy blocked roads in a similar conflict in 1997, law enforcement responded with brutal violence (the state would eventually pay out $2.7 million to victims).

=== African-Americans ===
Tax resistance has occasionally been deployed in the battle for civil rights for black people in the United States. For example:

The "no taxation without representation" argument was evoked by African-American businessman Paul Cuffee, who refused to pay his state taxes and petitioned the legislature in 1780 and 1781 on behalf of himself and other African-Americans, saying "we apprehend ourselves to be aggrieved, in that... we are not allowed the privilege of freemen of the State, having no vote or influence in the election of those that tax us."

Robert Purvis refused to pay a school tax in Philadelphia in 1853, on the grounds that his children were not allowed to attend the whites-only schools the tax supported. He wrote,

I object to the payment of this tax, on the ground that my rights as a citizen, and my feelings as a man and a parent have been grossly outraged in depriving me, in violation of law and justice, of the benefits of the school system which this tax was designed to sustain.

=== Undermining Reconstruction state governments ===
After the American Civil War, the United States government established Reconstruction era governments in the states of the former Confederacy that included black and carpetbagger representatives. The loss of political power by the formerly dominant white supremacists led to resentment, protest, and the formation of paramilitaries and parallel governments. Occasionally, tax resistance was used as a tactic to withdraw financial support and political legitimacy from the reconstruction governments in favor of the white supremacist parallel governments.

For example, tax resistance was used as a tactic by South Carolina Democrats in the months leading up to the collapse of the carpetbagger administration of Republican Daniel Chamberlain and his replacement by former Confederate Army officer Wade Hampton III.

White supremacist gubernatorial candidate John McEnery established a parallel government in Reconstruction Louisiana, in opposition to the carpetbagger government of governor William Pitt Kellogg, and urged sympathetic citizens to pay taxes to his government rather than the Kellogg "usurpation".

=== Railroad bond shenanigans ===
In the 1870s a number of American localities were victims of railroad bond swindles. Promoters would ask the residents to vote to issue bonds to pay for the running of a railroad line to their area, these bonds being backed by the local tax base. In theory the economic growth that would come from the new rail line would more than pay for the bonds by the time they were mature and the bondholders needed to be paid off. In fact, the railroad never materialized and the bond promoters vanished with the money.

Some of these localities organized and refused to honor the bonds they had issued. Because by the time the bonds had matured they had likely been sold to new owners who did not participate in the original fraud, the court system was not usually very sympathetic to the defrauded taxpayers.

But this led to some notable examples of organized tax resistance in the United States.

For instance, in Cass and St. Clair counties, Missouri, local judges were elected who refused to enforce higher court rulings in favor of the bondholders that would have forced the County to inflict a tax in order to pay off the bonds. For a time, the judges held court in a cave in order to evade their eventual jailings for contempt of court.

In Steuben County, New York, the bondholders succeeded in forcing the community to create a property tax to pay off the bonds, but property owners refused to pay the tax and rallied to the support of those whose property was seized for failure to pay, successfully disrupting tax auctions.

In Kentucky, refusal to assess or pay taxes to pay off the bond swindle persisted for decades. Some towns refused to elect sheriffs or public officials of any kind (or no candidates could be found for the positions) so that nobody was legally qualified to assess taxes or engage in property seizures for failure to pay taxes. Local judges went into hiding to evade the rulings of higher courts. Armed citizens intimidated outsiders who tried to come and collect taxes by force.

=== Women's suffrage ===
Tax resistance was a less important part of the women's suffrage struggle in the United States than it was in the United Kingdom, but it still played a role and had some notable practitioners.

At the 1852 National Women's Rights Convention, Susan B. Anthony brought forward a tax resistance resolution:

Resolved, That it is the duty of the women of those States, in which woman has now by law a right to the property she inherits, to refuse to pay taxes. She is unrepresented in the Government...

Lucy Stone refused to pay her tax in 1858, on the grounds "that women suffer taxation, and yet have no representation, which is not only unjust to one-half the adult population, but is contrary to our theory of government."

Abby and Julia Smith were landowners in Glastonbury, Connecticut, who found in the 1870s that their property tax assessments kept rising relative to those of the male property owners of the area who could vote in local elections. They responded by refusing to pay taxes on "no taxation without representation" grounds, and their battle soon became a cause célèbre among suffrage activists and sympathizers throughout the country (in part thanks to the sisters' knack for publicity).

Anna Howard Shaw's automobile was sold at tax auction in 1915 in a celebrated tax resistance case.

==== Tax resistance by newly-enfranchised women in Pennsylvania ====
As women won the right to vote in the United States, they sometimes also became vulnerable to taxes that had previously only applied to men. When this happened in Pennsylvania, the shock was accompanied by resentment that the school tax in question applied mostly to women living in rural areas and not to those living in the largest Pennsylvania cities.

Although this example of American tax resistance involved thousands of women in many parts of the state and persisted for several years, there is little or no evidence that the resistance was formally organized. Nor apparently was there open protest; there is no record of rallies, picket marches, petitions, manifestos, named organizations, political coalitions, or the like. Rather, it seems to have been a form of leaderless resistance.

At first the women were emboldened by a quirk in the 1834 tax law that forbade "the arrest or imprisonment for non-payment of any tax of any female, or infant, or person found by inquisition to be of unsound mind." It took the state legislature a couple of years to update that law after the women's tax resistance began, and several women were eventually jailed, briefly, for their resistance.

=== "Bond Slackers" during World War I ===
Although the U.S. government raised some of its war budget via taxes, the most visible public war funding measure during World War I was the Liberty Bond program. Citizens were encouraged to loan money to the government for its war effort through the purchase of bonds.

Although the purchase of bonds was ostensibly voluntary, strong coercive pressure—up to and including mob violence—was directed at those who would not buy. "Bond slackers" (the popular term at the time for people who did not buy war bonds, or did not buy them in sufficient quantity) could be run out of town, might lose their jobs, have their property stolen or vandalized, might be tarred-and-feathered, otherwise tortured, coated in paint, threatened with murder, or subjected to hours of questioning by hooded interrogators in impromptu star chambers in the hopes of prompting them to say something that would incriminate them under the Espionage Act.

Those who resisted such pressure and refused to buy war bonds included conscientious objectors to war such as International Bible Students and members of traditional peace churches such as Mennonites, anti-capitalists, and European immigrants from countries the U.S. and its allies were fighting.

Herbert Lord, Director of Finance for the War Department, considered this "an organized effort to discourage and defeat the loan", and it was attributed to a conspiracy of "pro-German agents".

=== Property tax strikes during the Great Depression ===
The Great Depression introduced unprecedented tax burdens to Americans. While real-estate values plummeted and unemployment skyrocketed, the cost of government remained high. As a result, taxes as a percentage of the national income nearly doubled from 11.6 percent in 1929 to 21.1 in 1932. Most of the increase took place at the local level and especially squeezed the resources of real estate taxpayers. Local tax delinquency rose steadily to a record of 26.3% in 1933.

Many Americans reacted to these conditions by forming taxpayers' leagues to call for lower taxes and cuts in government spending. By some estimates, there were three thousand of these leagues by 1933. Taxpayers' leagues endorsed such measures as laws to limit and rollback taxes, lowered penalties on tax delinquents, and cuts in government spending. Partly as a result of their efforts, sixteen states and numerous localities adopted property tax limitations while three states instituted homestead exemptions.

While taxpayers' leagues usually favored traditional legal and political strategies, a few promoted tax resistance. Probably the best known of these was the Association of Real Estate Taxpayers (ARET) in Chicago. From 1930 to 1933, it led one of the largest tax strikes in American history.

ARET functioned primarily as a cooperative legal service. Each member paid annual dues of $15 to fund lawsuits challenging the constitutionality of real-estate assessments. The suits, when finally filed, took the form of a 7,000-page, two-foot-thick book listing the names and tax data for all 26,000 co-litigants.

The radical side of the movement became apparent by early 1931 when ARET called for taxpayers to withhold real-estate taxes (or "strike") pending a final ruling by the Illinois Supreme Court, and later the U.S. Supreme Court. Mayor Anton Cermak and other politicians desperately tried to break the strike by threatening criminal prosecution, revocation of city services, and the seizure of property.

The Association's influence peaked in late 1932, with a membership of near 30,000 people, a budget of over $600,000, and its own radio show. A failed legal suit, government counter-measures, and infighting took their toll and the movement, having in large part accomplished its goals, declined thereafter.

=== Emergence of a non-sectarian war tax resistance movement ===
Tax resistance motivated by conscientious objection to war had traditionally been practiced in the United States under the Christian theory of nonresistance as extrapolated by the historic peace churches, and its development had largely taken place within the context of those churches. Rare exceptions included the brief flowering of tax resistance among New England Transcendentalists like Henry David Thoreau, Charles Lane, and Amos Bronson Alcott, a small war tax resistance contingent in the late-19th Century pacifist movement, and a few war tax resisters in small sects like the International Bible Students and Rogerenes.

After World War II, a non-sectarian war tax resistance movement began to come together, and would develop its own practices of war tax resistance under a more secular theory of pacifism.

Some of the figures in this early movement were members of the historic peace churches, such as Mary Stone McDowell, a Quaker who had resisted the Liberty Bond drives during World War I, but many others were not. Dorothy Day and Ammon Hennacy were from the Catholic Worker movement, Ernest Bromley was a Methodist, Walter Gormly and Maurice McCrackin Presbyterians, Juanita and Wally Nelson non-religious, for example.

In 1948, the group Peacemakers formed to (loosely) organize this movement. This group would develop a pacifist theory of conscientious objection to military taxation that was not tied to a particular religious doctrine. They published a guide to war tax resistance in 1963 and developed tactics of resistance practice and of publicity that would lead to the growth of the movement, to a new resurgence of war tax resistance among the traditional peace churches, and to the establishment of nonsectarian war tax resistance as an ongoing part of the American scene.

=== Foes of social security taxation ===
The United States Social Security program had its share of critics and faced political opposition. It also evoked some tax resistance against the payroll and self-employment taxes that funded it. This came from two factions in particular: conservatives who opposed the government program for ideological reasons, and Amish who had religious prohibitions against participating in insurance programs in general.

==== Conservative opposition ====
American conservatives who refused to pay payroll or self-employment taxes for the social security program expressed their opposition in terms of opposing government overreach into private lives and contracts, and opposition to socialism. "For those of us who still have confidence in our own ability," one wrote, "such a socialistic thing should not be forced upon us."

About a dozen women from around Marshall, Texas, organized in 1951 to refuse to submit Social Security taxes on behalf of their domestic help. "It's not the money, it's the principle," said spokesperson Carolyn M. Abney. "That law is unconstitutional."

It is a violation of the sanctity of the American home. The law violates a basic American freedom. Already business has been socialized and the American home is the last stronghold against socialism. This may sound dramatic, but we are fighting to preserve the freedoms our forefathers gave to us.

— Carolyn M. Abney, in "Texas Housewives to Press Social Security Test Case". Reading Eagle. 1952-07-01.

The "Texas Housewives" (as they were called in the newspapers) lost a court case in 1952. They appealed on 13th Amendment grounds; that's the amendment that bans involuntary servitude—their attorney explained that the law "forces these housewives to be unpaid tax collectors for the government." They lost this case as well, and in 1954 they failed in an attempted Supreme Court appeal. Meanwhile, the government seized the resisted money from their bank accounts.

The women continued to defy the Internal Revenue Service (I.R.S.) for some time after, claiming that the courts had not answered the Constitutional question but had only verified the tax statute. They eventually gave up the fight and began to pay the required quarterly taxes for their employees.

Mary Cain refused to pay $42.87 in self-employment tax in 1952 and hid her assets to make sure the government would have to make it a criminal matter (and thus a possible test case) rather than a simple civil asset seizure. In the case that eventually resulted, Cain's arguments were turned down by the Fifth Circuit Court of Appeals and she had no luck with a Supreme Court appeal, but the government eventually dropped the case anyway. When the government padlocked the office of her newspaper as part of a seizure process, Cain sawed the lock off the door and mailed it to the I.R.S. defiantly. "I've had enough of the New Deal. I'm sick of the whole Truman administration," she said.

Vivien Kellems refused to pay the self-employment tax on her income in 1952, and recruited a small group of other businesspersons (including Mary Cain) to join her protest. She wrote in a letter to Treasury Secretary John W. Snyder that she felt she already had "adequate insurance" and she urged the government to indict her so that she could be a test case to the Supreme Court.

==== Conscientious objection from the Amish ====
The Amish have a strong tradition of mutual aid and believe that purchasing insurance betrays distrust in God and in the community of believers. The original name of the Social Security system was "Old Age, Survivors, and Disability Insurance", and Amish people interpreted it as a forbidden form of insurance. Because of this, when the U.S. government extended the Social Security system to cover farmers in 1955, many Amish refused to participate, and the government responded by seizing their property. After some farmers had bank accounts seized, others closed their accounts. When the government tried to levy checks due to the resisters from the milk processing cooperatives they sold their milk to, the cooperatives (also in Amish hands) refused to hand over the checks.

The government was then reduced to seizing livestock. In a celebrated case in 1961, the government seized Valentine Byler's horses during Spring plowing. Asked about this insensitivity to Byler's livelihood, the district I.R.S. Chief of Collections answered, "Plowing never occurred to me. I live in an apartment." Byler received messages of support from around the country, and the press took up his cause.

What kind of "welfare" is it that takes a farmer's horses away at spring plowing time in order to dragoon a whole community into a "benefit" scheme it neither needs nor wants, and which offends its deeply held religious scruples?

— "Welfarism Gone Mad". New York Herald Tribune. 1961-05-14.

Legislation that would exempt the Amish from the Social Security program was introduced in Congress at least as early as 1959, and some of the resisters took the unusual step (for the Amish) of petitioning the government in 1961. In 1965, the United States changed the Social Security law in a way that exempted self-employed Amish people from having to pay into the Social Security program.

=== War tax resistance during the Vietnam War ===
The American war against Vietnam led to strong opposition in the United States.

Inspired by the use of civil disobedience in the civil rights movement and by an earlier generation of conscientious objectors to war tax payment, a new generation of resisters created a version of war tax resistance that was more oriented toward protest than conscientious objection.

In 1966, A.J. Muste circulated a tax refusal pledge meant as an advertisement for The Washington Post that 370 people signed, including the singer Joan Baez, on the grounds "that the ordinary channels of protest have been exhausted."

This country has gone mad. But I will not go mad with it. I will not pay for organized murder. I will not pay for the war in Vietnam.

— Joan Baez

In 1967, President Lyndon Johnson proposed an income tax surtax explicitly to pay for war expenses. This was the first tax in the modern United States that was explicitly a "war tax" and helped to boost the prominence of war tax resistance as a protest tactic.

In early 1967, a "No Tax for War Committee" organized by Maurice McCrackin circulated a sign-on statement that eventually attracted more than 200 signatures, and that read:

Because so much of the tax paid the federal government goes for poisoning of food crops, blasting of villages, napalming and killing thousands upon thousands of people, as in Vietnam at the present time, I am not going to pay taxes on 1966 income.

A "Writers & Editors War Tax Protest" the same year was somewhat less bold in its declaration (not all declaring total resistance, but some refusing to pay only the 10% surtax or only 23% of their total tax) but more impressive in its list of names. The protest, which appeared in New York Post, New York Times Book Review and Ramparts was eventually signed by about 528 people.

(The Washington Post refused to print the ad "on the grounds that it was an implicit exhortation to violate the law", and the New York Times too, on the grounds that "we do not accept advertising urging readers to perform an illegal action" but thanks to the Streisand effect the word got out even better that way.)

In addition, by this time thousands of Americans were refusing to pay the federal telephone excise tax on their phone service.

In 1970, five Harvard and nine M.I.T. faculty members, including Nobel laureates Salvador E. Luria and George Wald, announced that they would be resisting taxes in protest of the war.

In 1972, Jane Hart, wife of U.S. Senator Philip Hart, said that she would be resisting the federal income tax. By this time, every major I.R.S. center had a staff member assigned to be the "Viet Nam Protest Coordinator".

=== American tax resistance in the 21st Century ===
Tax resistance continues to be a background theme in American political discussion, and occasionally tax resistance campaigns break out in the United States.

The National War Tax Resistance Coordinating Committee, today's successor of organizations like Peacemakers and the Committee for Nonviolent Revolution, organizes conscientious objectors to military taxation and anti-war protesters who use tax resistance as a tactic.

The "Don't Buy Bush's War" campaign in 2007–08, organized by Code Pink to protest the U.S. War against Iraq, got 2,000 people to sign a tax resistance pledge.

The Tea Party protests of 2009 were in part a protest against high taxes (in addition to the allusion to the Boston Tea Party, the name was supposed to stand for "Taxed Enough Already"). Code Pink even reached out across the ideological aisle to try to find some common ground.

Tax resistance is used in smaller-scale struggles as well. When 23 county officials in Luzerne County, Pennsylvania were charged with corruption, and the county nonetheless decided to raise taxes by 10%, residents rebelled. One, Fred Heller, recorded a song in 2010—"Take This Tax and Shove It"—to try to rally people to refuse to pay. When a smoking ban in Lansing, Michigan cut into their business, several taverns there launched a tax strike in 2011. When the Seattle, Washington, City Council introduced a city income tax in 2017, the state Republican Party did not wait for the tax to be ruled unconstitutional, but immediately called for "nothing less than civil disobedience—that is, refusal to comply, file, or pay."
