= The Cold War and the Income Tax =

Book by Edmund Wilson

The Cold War and the Income Tax: A Protest
- First edition cover
- Author: Edmund Wilson
- Language: English
- Genre: Non-fiction
- Publisher: Farrar, Straus
- Publication date: 1963
- Publication place: United States
- ISBN: 0374526680

The Cold War and the Income Tax: A Protest is a book written by Edmund Wilson and published by Farrar, Straus in 1963.

== Edmund Wilson ==
Wilson was an American literary critic and author. As a younger man Wilson sympathized with Communism, but came to be disillusioned the more closely he looked at the Soviet experiment. "By 1940 when he finally published his epic history of socialism, To the Finland Station, seven years in the making, he had completely repudiated Russian socialism."

== Stumbling into tax resistance ==
His tax resistance was strangely half-hearted and muddled, but he devoted a book to it. The way he tells the story, "Between the year 1946 and the year 1955, I did not file any income tax returns." Not for any ideological or ethical reason, but because "I thought that this obligation could always be attended to later. I had no idea at that time of how heavy our taxation had become or of the severity of the penalties exacted for not filing tax returns."

Wilson finally sought out "an old friend of mine, an extremely able lawyer," who told him that he was in danger of heavy fines and jail time and was in his opinion "in such a mess that he thought the best thing I could do was to become a citizen of some other country." He instructed the lawyer instead to make out the returns for the years he had failed to file, along with a $9,000 down payment on whatever it was that he owed.

== Income tax ==
Subsequent chapters tell of Wilson's struggles with what was already a labyrinthine and Kafkaesque Internal Revenue Service bureaucracy, which Wilson compares with those in the Soviet Union. The $9,000 he offers is laughably inadequate to pay what he owes, his fines, or even his eventual legal fees.

His troubles lead him to investigate the history of the income tax in the United States, and to write extensively on how the assumptions the IRS makes about how and when people earn income map poorly to the actual way a literary man like Wilson makes a living. He dives into the tax code and discovers that "[t]he question of what ought to be taxed and how much and which deductions ought to be allowed has reached a point of fine-spun complexity that — working in terms of a different set of values — recalls the far-fetched distinctions of medieval theology."

What starts out looking like a literary man's attempt to squeeze some wry observations out of an unfortunate and naïve encounter with the government at its bureaucratic best starts to turn. Wilson takes a long, hard look at the federal government's budget and notices that huge hunks of it go to pay for wars past present and future and (this is 1963, remember) the program to put a man on the moon. After a brief detour to contrast the lunar project with a project he thinks underfunded and more valuable, to publish collected editions of some of America's finest authors, he dives a little deeper into the military budget.

== Cold War ==
Wilson is shocked and alarmed at the sums spent to fuel the arms race with the Soviet Union, and upset also at how enthusiastically his government pursues chemical, biological, and nuclear weapons technology. In assessing the role of game theory in preparing for possible nuclear war, Wilson ultimately determines that

When the stakes in games become so serious—when everybody's life is at stake—they ought not to be played at all, and the taxpayers should not support them. But the taxpayers do support them, and that is why we cannot halt these activities.

And later:

I have said that it was difficult to understand, in what we call our free world, how it can come about that a scientist who has been working on CBR [Chemical, Biological and Radiological weapons] but is dubious about the morality of what he is doing should not find it in his power to resign. But how free are we citizens of this free world to resign from the gigantic and demented undertakings to which our government has got us committed?

He also observes that, because of the importance of these problems and the difficult and compelling moral demands they make on us, they have paradoxically disappeared from conversation—a strategy similar to not talking about a family member's drinking problem in the hope it will seem to have never existed:

[T]he United States, for all its so much advertised comforts, is today an uncomfortable place. It is idle for our "leaders" and "liberals" to talk about the necessity for Americans to recover their old idealism, to consecrate themselves again to their mission of liberation. Our national mission, if our budget proves anything, has taken on colossal dimensions, but in its interference in foreign countries and its support of oppressive regimes, it has hardly been a liberating mission, and the kind of idealism involved is becoming insane and intolerant in the manner of the John Birch Society. Even those who do not give much conscious thought to what has been taking place are discouraged and blocked in their work or alienated from their normal ambitions by the paralyzing chill of a national effort directed toward a blind dead end which is all the more horrifying and haunting for being totally inconsecutive with their daily lives and inapprehensible to their imaginations. The accomplished, the intelligent, the well-informed go on in their useful professions that require high integrity and intellect, but they suffer more and more from the crowding of an often unavowed constraint which may prevent them from allowing themselves to become too intelligent and well-informed or may drive them to indulge their skills in gratuitous and futile exercises. One notices in the conversation of this professional class certain inhibitions on free expression, a tacit understanding that certain matters had better not be brought into discussion, which sometimes makes one feel in such talk a kind of fundamental frivolity.

Wilson then tells the stories of a few people who were unable to successfully silence the cries of their own cognitive dissonance. He starts with Major Claude Eatherly, who commanded the bomber group that dropped the atomic bombs on Japan, capping 13 months of duty in World War II. Shortly afterwards, he became horrified by what he had done, and hopeless at the possibility of repenting for or earning forgiveness for killing so many and causing so much pain. He tried speaking out with pacifist groups, sending parts of his paycheck to Hiroshima, writing letters of apology, and twice attempting suicide. At one point "he set out to try to discredit the popular myth of the war hero [by] committing petty crimes from which he derived no benefit: he forged a check for a small amount and contributed the money to a fund for the children of Hiroshima. He held up banks and broke into post offices without ever taking anything." Eatherly was later confined for a time to the Veterans' Administration Hospital in Waco, Texas, for psychiatric care, where he wrote this:

Whilst in no sense, I hope, either a religious or a political fanatic, I have for some time felt convinced that the crisis in which we are all involved is one calling for a thorough re-examination of our whole scheme of values and of loyalties. In the past it has sometimes been possible for men to "coast along" without posing to themselves too many searching questions about the way they are accustomed to think and to act—but it is reasonably clear that our age is not one of these. On the contrary, I believe that we are rapidly approaching a situation in which we shall be compelled to re-examine our willingness to surrender responsibility for our thoughts and our actions to some social institution such as the political party, trade union, church or State. None of these institutions are adequately equipped to offer infallible advice on moral issues and their claim to offer such advice needs therefore to be challenged.

== Go on strike? ==
"Now, how is one to struggle against this situation?" asks Wilson. "Go on strike and refuse to pay taxes?" And much of the remainder of the book is devoted to people who decided to do just that, like Dr. A.J. Muste, Eroseanna Robinson, Walter Gormly, and Rev. Maurice McCrackin, all of whom confronted the IRS directly and bore the brunt of its most vigorous enforcement efforts.

Wilson ends by asking: "And what is the author of this protest to do?"

I am not going to let myself be sent to Leavenworth, as Dr. McCrackin was. I have thought of establishing myself in a foreign country as my lawyer friend suggested and as I thought him rather absurd for suggesting. I do feel that I must not violate the agreement I have signed with the government to surrender for three years longer all the income that I take in above a certain taxable amount. My original delinquency was due not to principle but to negligence; but I now grudge every penny of the imposition, and I intend to outmaneuver this agreement, as well as the basic taxes themselves by making as little money as possible and so keeping below taxable levels. I have always thought myself patriotic and have been in the habit in the past of favorably contrasting the United States with Europe and the Soviet Union; but our country has become today a huge blundering power unit controlled more and more by bureaucracies whose rule is making it more and more difficult to carry on the tradition of American individualism; and since I can accept neither this power unit's aims nor the methods it employs to finance them, I have finally come to feel that this country, whether or not I continue to live in it, is no longer any place for me.

According to Wilson biographer Lewis M. Dabney, Wilson transferred the copyright for the book "to A.J. Muste's magazine Liberation."

== Aftermath ==
Wilson was awarded the Presidential Medal of Freedom in the same year that The Cold War and the Income Tax was published. Arthur M. Schlesinger, Jr. writes that President Kennedy:

…himself added Edmund Wilson's name to the list in 1963. (Knowing Wilson's dislike of honors on principle, I called him to see whether he would accept the Medal. He said that he would be greatly pleased to do so, but that the President should know he was writing a pamphlet attacking the income tax and the defense budget. It was not, he said, directed so much against the Kennedy administration, parts of which he much admired, as against governments in general; still the President ought to know about it, and he would understand if we decided not to go ahead with the presentation. When I reported this to Kennedy, he smiled and said that he didn't think it would make any difference.)

Lewis M. Dabney, in Edmund Wilson: A Life in Literature, adds to this account:

[Wilson] stipulated that the president had to be made aware of his pamphlet and sent the text to Schlesinger, who passed on a summary. When a man named Bacon from the IRS brought in a memorandum opposing the award — parts of it paralleling the ever expanding FBI file on Wilson — Schlesinger and Theodore Sorensen each remembered that Kennedy decisively stated, "This is not an award for good conduct but for literary merit.

Phyllis Schlafly attacked this awarding of the Medal of Freedom to Wilson in her 1964 book A Choice, Not an Echo, attributing the decision to Lyndon Johnson.

In his book Intellectuals, historian Paul Johnson shows little sympathy for Wilson's tax troubles:

They had given him a frightening insight into the harshness of the modern state at its most belligerent — the tax-gathering role — but this should have come as no surprise to an imaginative man who had made it his business to study the state in theory and in practice. The person who is in the weakest position to attack the state is he who has largely ignored its potential for evil while strongly backing its expansion on humanitarian grounds and is only stirred to protest when he falls foul of it through his own negligence. That exactly describes Wilson's position. In his book he tried to evade his own inconsistencies by arguing that most of his income tax went on defence spending induced by Cold War paranoia. But then he had not paid his state income taxes either, and they did not go on defence. Nor did he meet the point that, by the time he settled, a rapidly rising proportion of federal income tax was going on welfare. Was it morally justifiable to evade that too? In short, the book shows Wilson at his worst and makes one grateful that, in general, he ceased being a political intellectual by the time he was forty.

Dabney writes that Wilson's tax troubles continued for the rest of his life, and beyond:

The fight with the IRS… dragged on into the [Kennedy] administration, the agency never quite ready to compromise.… Elena [Wilson] began appealing to Schlesinger at the White House. Commissioner Mortimer Caplin was asked to produce a settlement, and the government eventually agreed to $25,000, though continuing to insist on a $30,000 collateral agreement against future earnings. Wilson would die in debt… for the money with which he paid this off, and Elena had to justify all the medical expenses of his last decade to auditors. She would be submitting detailed accounts in the year of her death, seven years after her husband's.
