= An Act of Conscience =

1997 American documentary film

- Directed by: Robbie Leppzer
- Written by: Robbie Leppzer; Sara Elinoff
- Produced by: Robbie Leppzer
- Starring: Randy Kehler; Betsy Corner
- Narrated by: Martin Sheen
- Cinematography: Robbie Leppzer
- Edited by: Robbie Leppzer
- Music by: Steven Schoenberg
- Production company: Turning Tide Productions
- Distributed by: Cinemax
- Release dates: January 1997 (Sundance); April 15, 1997 (Cinemax)
- Running time: 90 minutes
- Country: United States
- Language: English

An Act of Conscience is a 1997 American documentary film directed, shot and edited by Robbie Leppzer. It centers around war tax resisters Randy Kehler and Betsy Corner, and the years-long struggle that ensued after the Internal Revenue Service (IRS) seized their home in Colrain, Massachusetts, in 1989, to collect $27,000 in unpaid taxes and interest. When the house is sold to another couple, Kehler, Corner, and hundreds of supporters occupy the property in protest.

An Act of Conscience is narrated by actor Martin Sheen, who volunteered his time to do so; the film features appearances by Jesuit priest and anti-war activist Daniel Berrigan, as well as political folk singer Pete Seeger, both in support of Kehler and Corner. Over 90 hours of footage was filmed for the documentary.

An Act of Conscience premiered at the Sundance Film Festival in January 1997, and it aired on Cinemax later that same year on April 15, which is recognized as Tax Day in the United States. The film received generally positive reviews from critics, who characterized the events documented as engaging and thought-provoking.

== Background ==
Randy Kehler and his wife Betsy Corner owned a house in Colrain, Massachusetts, where they lived with their daughter Lillian. Kehler had previously been to federal prison for refusing the draft during the Vietnam War. In 1977, the couple stopped paying federal income taxes as a protest against war and military spending, though they continued to pay their state and local taxes. The practice is known as war tax resistance, a concept distinct from tax evasion in that it is based in open conscientious objection to war, military spending, US military interventions in other countries, or nuclear proliferation.

Each year, the couple have filed a federal income tax form with the IRS, without enclosing payment. According to Corner, they would calculate the federal income taxes they owed each year, and would then donate 50% of that amount to victims of US-backed war in Nicaragua and El Salvador; the other 50% would be donated to women's shelters, veterans' outreach programs, the homeless, and other local organizations. In March 1989, the US government legally seized ownership of the couple's home, after they had refused to pay their federal income taxes for 12 years.

== Synopsis ==
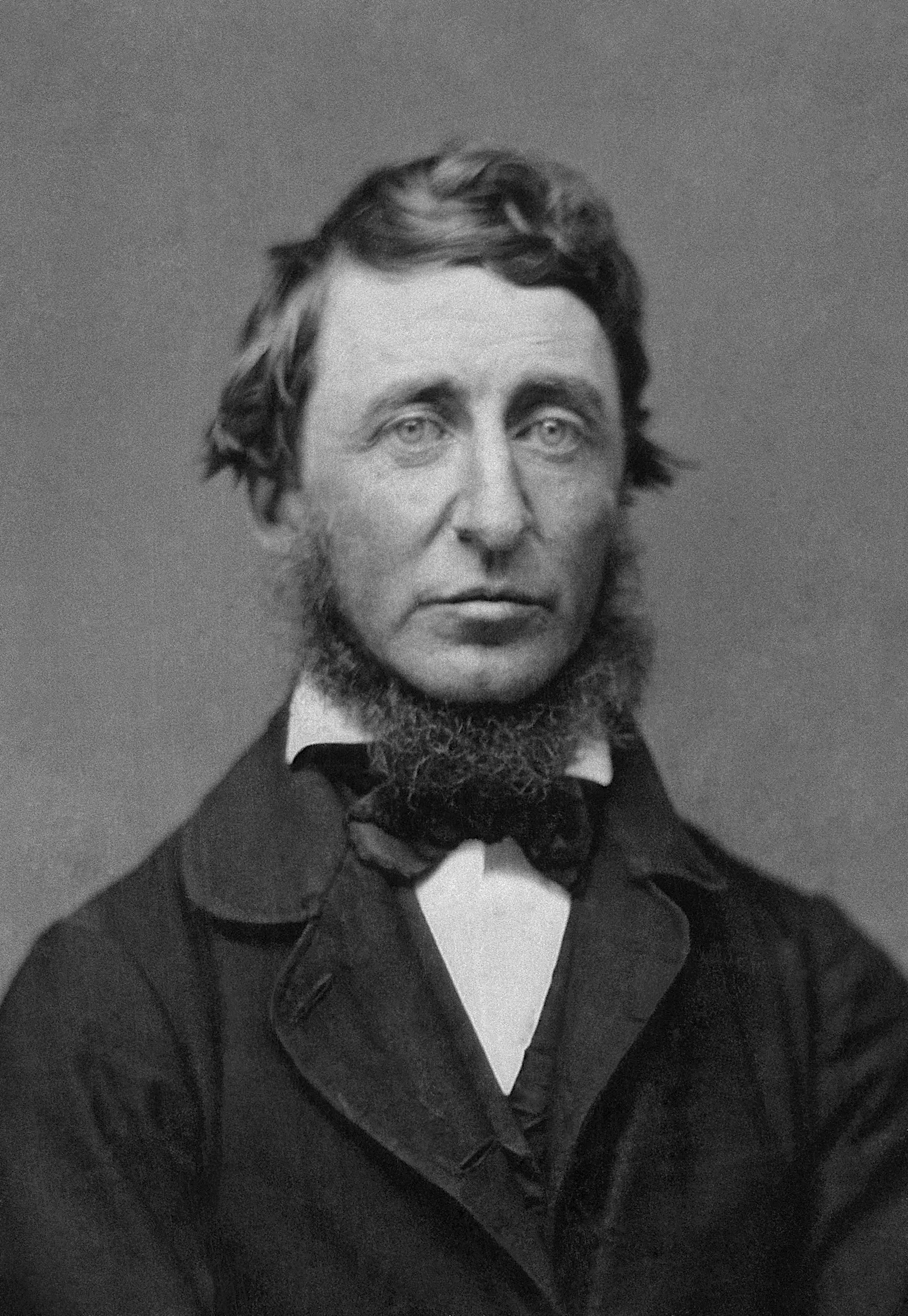
In addition to the events surrounding Kehler and Corner, the film outlines a history of tax resistance in the US, citing resistance from American colonists, Henry David Thoreau (pictured), and those who opposed the Vietnam War.

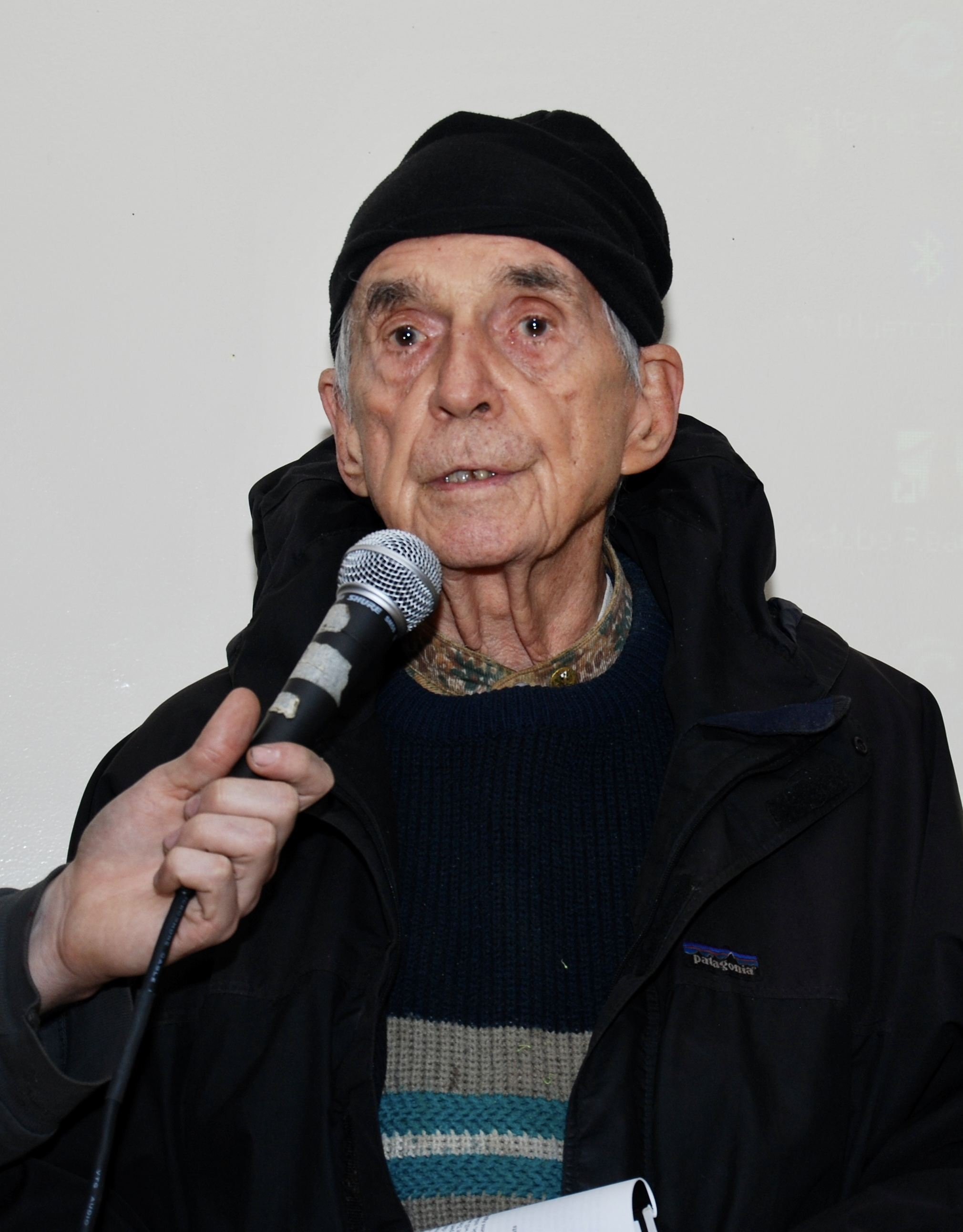
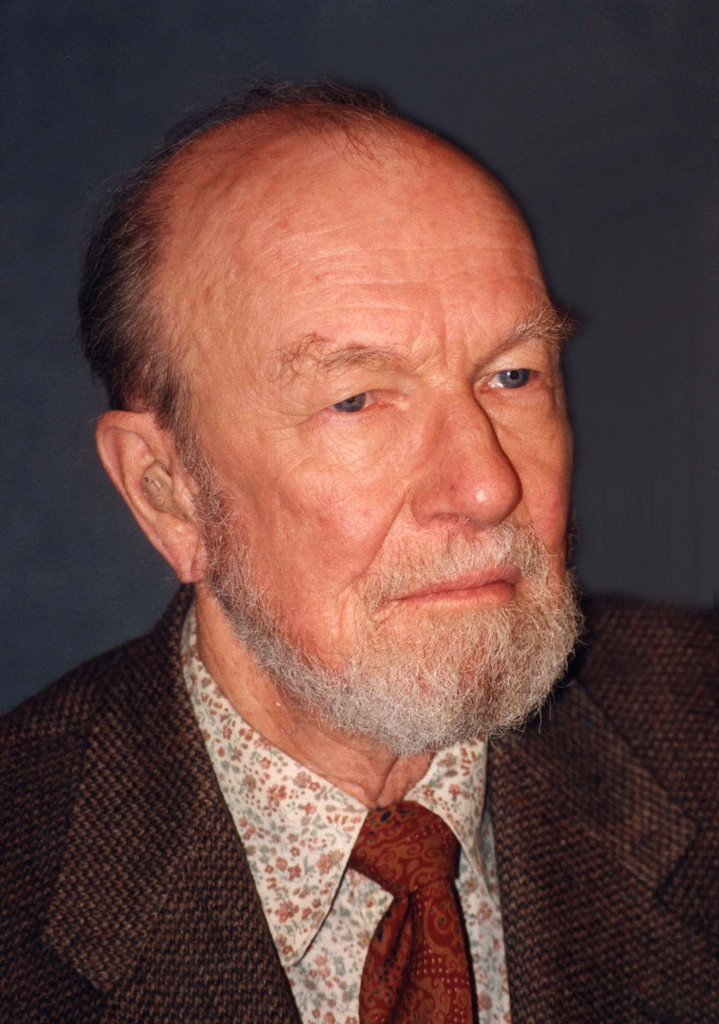
Activist–priest Dan Berrigan (left) and political folk singer Pete Seeger (right) appear in the film

An Act of Conscience documents the events that followed the US government's seizure of Kehler and Corner's house in Colrain. In July 1989, the Internal Revenue Service (IRS) holds a public auction to sell the home, seeking to recover $27,000 in back taxes and interest. Supporters of the couple submit bids in the form of food and community services in lieu of monetary bids, but the government rejects these as payments. Ultimately, the auction receives no monetary bids, and the government purchases the home for the minimum bid of $5,100.

In 1990, a formal eviction notice is issued to the couple, stating that they are illegally occupying US government property. The two dispute the seizure of their home, arguing that US military policies are in violation of international law. In November 1990, the district court of Springfield rejected the couple's arguments, and issued a federal court order requiring them to vacate the house; however, the couple refused to move out. On December 3, 1991, US Marshals and IRS agents seize the home and arrest Kehler for violating the court order. Shortly thereafter, supporters of the couple reoccupy the property, risking arrest.

Kehler is held in Hampshire County Jail in Northampton and charged with contempt of court. On February 12, 1992, seven people are arrested for occupying the house, and the house—but not the land, which belongs to the Valley Community Land Trust—is sold at auction to Danny Franklin and Terry Charnesky for $5,400. Following the sale, Kehler is released from jail, and he, Corner, and their supporters reoccupy the house.

Franklin and Charnesky meet Kehler, Corner, and their supporters; Charnesky understands the position of the couple, but argues that they should have paid their federal income taxes regardless. For two months, the Kehler–Corner supporters continue to occupy the house in weeklong shifts, while Kehler and Corner stay at a nearby neighbor's house. Jesuit priest and anti-war activist Daniel Berrigan visits the property in support of Kehler and Corner; other supporters include folk singer Pete Seeger and activist Wally Nelson.

On April 15, 1992, Franklin, Charnesky, and a group of their friends move in and occupy the house while Kehler, Corner, and their supporters are protesting outside IRS offices in Greenfield. Kehler, Corner, and their supporters begin a lively protest and round-the-clock vigil just outside the house, and eventually build a small wooden structure for shelter. Over 14 months, hundreds of people join the protest and vigil in support of Kehler and Corner. On May 28, 1993, the Franklin County Superior Court issued an injunction against the Kehler–Corner protests and, subsequently, over 50 protesters were arrested and jailed after violating the injunction. Still, the protests continue until September, when they are finally discontinued. On December 31, 1993, an out-of-court settlement is reached between the Land Trust and the Franklin–Charnesky family, who agree to leave the house and deed it and the land-lease to the Land Trust in exchange for an undisclosed sum of money.

By 1994, Kehler and Corner moved in with Corner's mother in a new home built by the Land Trust, adjacent to their former house. Their former house was sold to another family, and the Franklin–Charnesky family moved to a house in a nearby town. In April 1995, construction on a low-income housing community in the area, "Building Our Swords into Plowshares", which was proposed by Kehler and Corner, was completed. The couple continues to refuse to pay their federal income taxes, donating the money instead to war victims and the homeless.

== Release ==
An Act of Conscience had its world premiere at the Sundance Film Festival in Park City, Utah, in January 1997, where it was screened in competition. The film was later broadcast on television on Cinemax as part of the channel's Reel Life series of documentaries; it first aired on Cinemax on April 15, 1997, to coincide with Tax Day in the US. The film also aired on the Sundance Channel, and screened at the Vermont International Film Festival on October 26, 1997.

== Reception ==
Variety's Joe Leydon called An Act of Conscience "sincere but overlong", criticizing it as being biased in favor of Kehler and his supporters, and concluding that it "raises a few thought-provoking points. But the technically proficient pic isn't likely to convert many who aren't already sympathetic to its cause." David Bianculli of the New York Daily News wrote that, "Leppzer doesn't frame the action [between the IRS and the tax resisters] artistically, or even always objectively, but the conflict itself escalated to intense and basic levels that make this documentary riveting." John Anderson of Newsday called it an "intriguing documentary" that "raises a lot of questions, including some about the film itself."

Bruce Watson of the Daily Hampshire Gazette gave the film a mostly positive review, calling it "a compelling documentary" that "deftly balances action and thought", and writing: "Well-paced, thoughtful, and moving, An Act of Conscience will engage even those who thought they knew this story." The St. Petersburg Times' Eric Deggans gave the film a grade of "B+", noting its "thought-provoking story". Rick Brough of the Park Record gave An Act of Conscience a score of four out of five stars, writing that it "[boasts] a compelling story to start with, but contains revelations that even the filmmakers didn't plan. [...] The film is a chronicle of black-and-white political idealism stumbling into a landscape of gray." Renée Graham of The Boston Globe concluded: "[Leppzer] presents a balanced, riveting story, sympathetic to all sides of the issue. He raises thought-provoking questions—how far is too far in terms of defending one's principles? And can one give in to the opposing side without undermining those principles?"

In 2017, Cale Guthrie Weissman, who was around three years old during the documentary's production and whose mother was a neighbor and supporter of Kehler and Corner, wrote: "As a work of art, [An Act of Conscience] suffers from conventionality. It's a linearly told story, very cut and dry. But there are moments when the truly remarkable is captured. In one of the more uncomfortable scenes, Kehler and Corner are in their house, occupying it. The new owners—thanks to a cheap foreclosure auction—are there, too. The two couples talk, each trying to understand the other. [...] It's both hard to watch and impossible to look away."

== See also ==
- The Boys Who Said No! – a 2020 documentary film featuring Kehler
