= Peacemakers =

American pacifist organization

- Formation: July 1948; 77 years ago
- Type: Pacifist organisation, Nonprofit, NGO
- Purpose: world peace
- Location: United States
- Key people: Ernest Bromley; Marion Bromley; Juanita Morrow Nelson; Wally Nelson

Peacemakers was an American pacifist organization founded following a conference on "More Disciplined and Revolutionary Pacifist Activity" in Chicago in July 1948. Ernest and Marion Bromley and Juanita and Wally Nelson largely organized the group. The group's organizational structure adopted a multidivisional organizational structure with a loose hierarchy, prioritizing local committees including but not limited to the Tax Refusal and Military Draft Refusal Committee.

== Organizational structure ==
The Peacemakers differed from other pacifist and nonviolent resistance organizations in their emphasis on small-scale, local, "cell-based" organizations and intentional communities. It had no national office, paid staff, or membership list. Some member groups of the Peacemakers organized funds to aid war resisters and people in the civil rights movement who had suffered reprisals.

== History ==
The development and ideological foundation of the Peacemakers can be credited to the Cold War American religious renewal and a rising discontent with American war efforts. In 1944 and 1945, Activist A.J. Muste held conferences on "the philosophy and methodology of revolutionary pacifism" alongside a successive conference in 1947 in coalition with the Consultative Peace Council at Pendle Hill. These meetings were the catalyst for the creation of the Peacemakers and garnered momentum for religious pacifism within the anti-war efforts of the 1940s. The Committee for Nonviolent Revolution was absorbed by the Peacemakers in 1948 following the Chicago conference for "more disciplined and revolutionary pacifism," which convened over 250 individuals. Membership was restricted to those who were willing to take personal responsibility in separating themselves from the "war-making state".

== Socio-political values ==
Peacemakers were a socialist-anarchist group whose values centered on economic and social community upliftment. According to A.J. Muste, the group marked the beginning of "an International community of Non-Violence and Good-Will." The organization believed in resource sharing and cooperation to displace a capitalistic lifestyle.

The group's members vowed to (1) refuse to serve in the armed forces in either peace or war; (2) refuse to make or transport weapons of war; (3) refuse to be conscripted or to register; (4) consider refusing to pay taxes for war purposes — a position already adopted by some; (5) spread the idea of peacemaking and to develop non-violent methods of opposing war through various forms of non-cooperation and to advocate unilateral disarmament and economic democracy.

Peacemakers were dedicated to "engaging in holy disobedience against the war-making and conscripting state." Their primary beliefs were founded upon a modern understanding of enlightenment realism. The organization's political values originated from the belief that society was materialistic and autocratic. According to scholar Leilah Danielson, the organization acted on the notion that "by taking suffering upon themselves in individual and collective active disobedience, they would cut through the conformist culture of the 1950s and awaken their fellow Americans to their responsibility for the atomic and international crisis". In the 1950s, the Peacemakers' socio-political involvement focused on advocacy for international nuclear disarmament and the civil rights movement. The group also held close ties to the Catholic Worker Movement, the Student Christian Movement, the Congress of Racial Equality (CORE), and the Gandhian philosophy of nonviolence.

== Achievements and Activism ==
Tax Refusal

During the late 1940s, the Peacemakers distributed several anti-taxation pamphlets and contributed to demonstrations towards this cause. Notably, a 1949 leaflet marked taxation as a "cancer with its roots in your purse and in your mind." It further stated, "you pay the bills of war, you accept war jobs, you bombed Nagasaki. If you keep on doing these routine, but really immoral things, you will soon bomb hundreds of other cities."

Military Draft Resistance

Peacemakers conducted an anti-conscription campaign in alliance with the War Resisters League and African American leader A. Philip Randolph. Segregation became a catalyst for Randolph's creation of the Committee against Jim Crow in Military Service and Training in 1947. Well-known civil rights organizer and activist Bayard Rustin was appointed Executive Secretary for the Committee against Jim Crow. The Peacemakers continued its advocacy campaigns by working in collaboration with the NAACP and local civil rights organizations to advocate for equality.

Community Mutual Aid

In June 1949, Wally Nelson and Carson Foltz held a meeting to discuss "how may a Peacemaker earn his living, spend his money, and provide economic security for his family in a profit-centered society." Starting with the Cincinnati, Ohio metro area, the forum focused on providing local communities with shared resources to avoid "predatory enterprises" (banks, insurance, investments, etc.). A consensus was met to create a voluntary mutual aid funding pool to which Peacemakers and participating individuals could contribute and benefit from simultaneously. Wally and Juanita were assigned the role of creating a program in addition to the funding pool that described Peacemaker economics and disciplines.

The local branch alongside the Bromleys purchased a group farmhouse north of Cincinnati to share the responsibility of food, finances, childcare, and maintaining communal belongings. This was done to model nonviolent and collectivist living based on Marxist philosophy. At the farmhouse, the Bromleys established Gano Peacemakers, Inc., a non-profit organization that was later seized by the IRS for their refusal to pay taxes, a method used to protest against military and war activities.

== Notable Members ==
Founders

- A.J. Muste
- Ernest Bromley
- Marion Bromley
- Juanita Nelson
- Wally Nelson
- Dwight Macdonald
- Ralph T. Templin
- Roy Kepler
- Cecil Hinshaw
- Milton Mayer
- Bayard Rustin
- George Houser
- Horace Champney

Important Figures

- Benny Bargen
- Dorothy Day
- Ralph DiGia
- Fyke Farmer
- Walter Gormly
- Ammon Hennacy
- Bradford Lyttle
- Maurice McCrackin
- Mary Stone McDowell
- Karl Meyer
- James Otsuka
- Jim Peck
- Eroseanna Robinson
- Igal Roodenko
- Max Sandin
- George Willoughby
- Lillian Willoughby
- Edmund Wilson

== See also ==
- List of peace activists
- Tax resistance in the United States
