= Juanita Morrow Nelson =

American civil rights and peace activist (1923–2015)

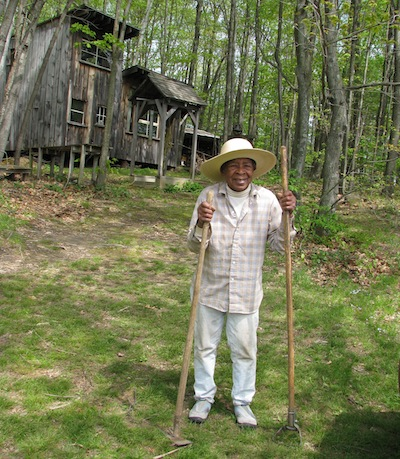
Juanita Nelson in front of her Deerfield, Massachusetts home (May 1, 2010)

Juanita Morrow Nelson (August 17, 1923 – March 9, 2015) was an American activist and war tax resister.

She co-founded the group Peacemakers in 1948. She was the author of A Matter of Freedom and Other Writings (1988).

== Biography ==
=== Early life ===
Nelson was born on 17 August 1923 in Cleveland, Ohio, to Eula and Oscar Morrow.

By her own account, at the age of sixteen (1939) she and her mother boarded a train in Cleveland, Ohio and were sent to the "colored" cars to the rear. Incensed by the deplorable conditions of the coach, young Juanita fumed for a while then decided to move to the "white" coaches toward the front. These coaches had comfortable seats, no trash and foul smells, and were well kept. "I sat there a while and when nothing happened, I decided to move forward to the next car. I sat a while in each of the white cars moving to the front of the train to show them that I was as good as any passenger. No one said anything until a black conductor said that he was concerned about what might happen to me, that I might get hurt or something. I went on until I had sat in all of the white cars and then went back to my mother in the colored coach. I didn't do anything, nothing had changed, but I felt a lot better about myself."

She enrolled in Howard University and was active in the NAACP Youth Group there. While a student there in 1943, she was arrested for trying to eat at the whites-only lunch counter at United Cigar Store and Luncheon on Pennsylvania Avenue in Washington, D.C. This was among the earliest sit-ins of the American Civil Rights Movement.

She left Howard University in 1943 to attend Western Reserve University, majoring in journalism. She graduated in 1946.

=== Adult life ===
She was an organizer for the Congress of Racial Equality (CORE), helping to found the Cleveland, Ohio, chapter of that organization, and working on the campaign to integrate the Euclid Beach amusement park. She moved to Chicago in 1947, continuing her work with the local CORE chapter there and also working as secretary for the national organization. She would continue to work with CORE until 1954.

In 1948 Juanita began her lifelong relationship with Wally Nelson, whom she met when she interviewed him in jail while she was working as a journalist. Wally was the first Field Secretary for CORE. With Wally, Juanita planned and participated in the first 'Freedom Rides' in the late 1940s, leading to the Southern Freedom Movement, also known as the Civil Rights Movement.

Together they began engaging in war tax resistance. "When we became tax resisters in 1948," they wrote, "it included not filing, not answering notices to supply information and making sure we had something to refuse." In 1948, they attended the founding conference of Peacemakers, an organization that pioneered the modern war tax resistance movement in the United States.

They joined a (controversially interracial) communal home with fellow-Peacemakers Ernest Bromley and Marion Bromley in Gano, Ohio, where they would live until 1956. Juanita was jailed for the first time during a nonviolent direct action campaign to try to desegregate the Coney Island (Cincinnati, Ohio) amusement park.

In 1957 the Nelsons spent a few months at the racially integrated Koinonia Farm in Americus, Georgia, and continued to work with that project for the next decade.

One account says: "In 1959 Juanita became the first woman in modern times to be apprehended for war tax refusal. She made her court appearance in the bathrobe she was wearing when apprehended at her home." Juanita was released the same day, and the government never did collect the money they claimed she owed them.

Over time, the Nelsons came to adopt the income-reduction method of war tax resistance. "Living on a reduced income is related to our refusal only as a progression of awareness, that our entire economic life is tied into violence. It seemed logical that the less we participated, the less we'd be giving to that system." Along with Wally, Juanita and another war tax resister, Eroseanna Robinson, were also arrested and dubbed the "Elkton Three" when they attempted to integrate a restaurant in Maryland.

Their critique of the economic system included a condemnation of usury — at one point, Juanita convinced the Pioneer Valley War Tax Resisters that interest payments were ethically insupportable. She then went into the bank that held the organization's small account "to ask that we not be credited with interest [and to] return the interest we had previously collected." The bank, after considerable puzzlement, eventually gave in to the request.

Wally and Juanita Nelson spent a few months at the Koinonia Farm in 1957 and continued to work with that project for the next decade.

Starting in 1960, the Nelsons worked with Operation Freedom, which helped to support black Americans who were facing organized reprisals and boycotts from white supremacists if they attempted to register to vote.

The Nelsons began to experiment with more deliberate voluntary simplicity in an off-the-grid home in Ojo Caliente in New Mexico in the early 1970s. They moved to Deerfield, Massachusetts, in 1974, building a 16′×24′ (36 m^{2}) cabin with salvaged materials and without electricity or plumbing, and growing the majority of their own food on a half-acre (2,000 m^{2}) of land. Eventually they came to live on less than $4,000 per year. As they aged, they wrote, "we may soon face some difficult decisions… We have no insurance. In latter years we've had our share of medical problems. Hospitalizations are covered by aid to the indigent. We talk with doctors before they take us on. Mostly they don't charge; sometimes we agree on something up to twenty percent of the fee. Our greatest insurance has been the outpouring of support from many, many younger friends (and some older ones)."

From 1989 to 1993, the Nelsons helped to resist the IRS seizure and sale of the home of war tax resisters Randy Kehler and Betsy Corner.

For their role as farmers, civil rights activists, pacifists, war tax resisters, their love & generosity and their spirited life of service to the movements of social justice, activist nonviolence and peace, Juanita Nelson and her husband, Wally Nelson received the Courage of Conscience Award from The Peace Abbey in Sherborn, Massachusetts.

On March 9, 2015, Nelson died at the age of 91.

== Quotes ==
- "Why am I going to jail? Why am I going to jail in a bathrobe? What does it matter in the scheme of things whether or not you put on your clothes? Are you not making, at best, a futile gesture, at worst, flinging yourself against something which does not exist? Is freedom more important than justice? Of what does freedom of the human spirit consist, that quality on which I place so much stress?"
- "It is, as far as I can see, an unpleasant fact that we cannot avoid decision-making. We are not absolved by following the dictates of a mentor or of a majority. For we then have made the decision to do that — have concluded because of belief or of fear or of apathy that this is the thing which we should do or cannot avoid doing. And then we share in the consequences of any such action. Are we doing more than trying to hide our nakedness with a fig leaf when we take the view expressed by a friend who belonged to a fundamental religious sect? At the time he wore the uniform of the United States Marines. 'I'm not helping to murder,' he said. 'I'm carrying out the orders of my government, and the sin is not mine.' I could never tell whether there was a bitter smile playing around his lips or if he was quite earnest. It is a rationalization commonly held and defended. It is a comforting presumption, but it still appears to me that, while the seat of government is in Washington, the seat of conscience is in me. It cannot be voted out of office by one or a million others."

== See also ==
- "Tempered reaction: Tax-resister Juanita Nelson skeptical". Greenfield Recorder. Greenfield, Massachusetts. 21 January 2009.

== Resources ==
- "Juanita Nelson speaking on Economic Disarmament, or Nonviolent Economics". grassrootspeace.org.
- "Juanita Nelson Timeline". First Person Oral Histories.
- "Collection: Juanita Morrow Nelson and Wallace F. Nelson Papers". Swarthmore College Peace Collection Archives & Manuscripts. August 17, 1923.
