= Northern California War Tax Resistance =

Regional American organization of war tax resisters

Northern California War Tax Resistance (NCWTR) is an activist group in the San Francisco bay area that promotes tax resistance as a way to protest against and/or disassociate from war and militarism. Despite the "Northern California" in the name, the group has a smaller, bay-area-specific focus, and there are other groups that serve war tax resisters in other parts of Northern California.

NCWTR is affiliated with the National War Tax Resistance Coordinating Committee.

NCWTR runs the People's Life Fund, with which tax resisters can "redirect" their taxes to charity. That fund was established in 1971.
