= Wally Nelson =

American civil rights and peace activist (1909–2002)

Wallace Floyd Nelson (27 March 1909 – 23 May 2002) was an American civil rights activist and war tax resister. He spent three and a half years in prison as a conscientious objector during World War II, was on the first of the "Freedom Rides" (then called the "Journey of Reconciliation") enforcing desegregation in 1947, and was the first national field organizer for the Congress of Racial Equality.

For their role as civil rights activists, they received the Courage of Conscience Award from The Peace Abbey in Sherborn, Massachusetts. Wally & Juanita were also founding members of the Valley Community Land Trust in western Massachusetts. A no-interest loan fund is now held by the trust in Wally's memory. Wally Nelson died at the age of 93 after more than a half-century of war tax resistance and activism.

== Early life ==
Wally Nelson was born in Altheimer, Arkansas, on March 27, 1909, to Lydia and Duncan William Nelson. His family moved to Little Rock, Arkansas, when he was about six. He was a younger son in a larger family of sharecroppers, which shaped some of Nelson's values.

Later, he went north with his brother in Batavia, Ohio, and attended a somewhat integrated high school there. He helped to integrate the welcoming party for incoming freshmen, to which black students had previously been excluded.

In 1933, after graduating high school, he moved to Chicago and became active in Methodist youth activities, attended a 1934 student anti-war strike, and joined the American Youth Congress. He was courted by the Communist Party but declined to join on the grounds that he had committed to nonviolence. He was one of those who took the Oxford Pledge, vowing that "Because war is anti-human, anti-social, and anti-Christian, I will not support my country at war."

He began attending Ohio Wesleyan University in 1940, and also began working on integration campaigns being organized by the Congress of Racial Equality, in part by trying to be served at restaurants and other establishments to see if they were obeying the local antidiscrimination ordinance.

== Career ==
=== Imprisonment ===
After being initially denied, Nelson eventually won conscientious objector status from the draft board, and when he was drafted he was assigned to a Civilian Public Service camp as an alternative to military service. Soon after beginning at the camp he realized it was a mistake, as he did not want to co-operate with the war effort by working for the government on the home front. After a year at the labor camp he left, on 1 July 1943, along with five other dissenters.

He went to Detroit, Michigan, and worked on anti-discrimination campaigns with the Congress of Racial Equality. Soon after his arrival there, he and his companions were arrested for having left Civilian Public Service. A hostile judge handed down maximum sentences: five years imprisonment.

He served seventeen months in county jail before being transferred to federal prison. It was during this time that he met his future wife, Juanita Morrow. She came to Cuyahoga County Jail as a reporter, working on a story on jail conditions. He and his cellmate asked to meet her and after that they kept in touch through the mail.

During his imprisonment, he went on a hunger strike after federal prison authorities insisted that he eat at a Jim Crow table in the prison. He again launched a hunger strike when he was transferred to Danbury federal prison, for more comprehensive reasons of opposition to the prison system. He said, "You've got me in jail; you're responsible for this, and I'm not going to eat until I am on the other side of these walls." During this hunger strike he went for eighteen days without eating anything at all. After this, they started to force feed him. The first time that the guards force fed him, they purposefully made the tubes too large, making this process torturous for Nelson. The tubes went through his nose and directly into his stomach. After this event, Nelson had to be hospitalized for his injuries. It had made him very sick, and he lost a lot of weight. The force feedings went on for 89 days, until Nelson was finally released from prison.

=== Freedom Ride ===
Nelson Participated in the first Freedom Ride (then referred to as the Journey of Reconciliation) in which people purposefully rode in the "wrong" seats (blacks in the front, whites in the back) in 1947 to test a new Supreme Court ruling banning the enforcement of segregation on interstate public transportation (several arrests and even convictions of riders proved that the ruling was not being obeyed). He rode with a number of notable Freedom Riders including Bayard Rustin, Conrad Lynn, James Peck, Igal Roodenko, Homer Jack, and George Houser. All of the participants were men; they decided the idea of black men being with white women would cause too much outrage and be too dangerous. Many of the men who took part in the original Freedom Ride were men who had also been imprisoned for being Conscientious Objectors and refusing to work in the labor camps.

=== Other ===
In 1948, Nelson cofounded the Peacemakers. This was a national organization dedicated to active non-violence as a way of life. He and his wife Juanita began their practice of refusing to pay taxes used for armaments and killing, they did this for the rest of their lives. They did so alongside civil rights activist Eroseanna Robinson, who worked on both desegregation and the war protest movement. The three were dubbed the "Elkton Three" after they were arrested together while trying to integrate a restaurant in Maryland.

Over time, the Nelsons came to adopt the income-reduction method of war tax refusal. They cut their expenses dramatically — building a house with salvaged materials and without electricity or plumbing, and growing the majority of their own food on a half-acre of land. Eventually they came to live on less than $5,000 per year.

The Nelsons joined a (controversially interracial) communal home with fellow-Peacemakers Ernest Bromley and Marion Bromley in Gano, Ohio, where they would live until 1956.

In 1948, Wally helped to organize the Cincinnati Committee on Human Relations, which worked to desegregate institutions there. In the early 1950s Nelson served as the first national field officer for the Congress of Racial Equality (CORE). For this job he directed many workshops on non-violent direct action in Washington, D.C. He left CORE after the organization took a more conservative turn in 1954.

In 1957 the Nelsons spent a few months at the racially integrated Koinonia Farm in Americus, Georgia, and continued to work with that project for the next decade.

Starting in 1960, the Nelsons worked with Operation Freedom, which helped to support black Americans who were facing organized reprisals and boycotts from white supremacists if they attempted to register to vote.

In 1968, he fasted once again, for 21 days, this time in support of the United Farm Workers campaign for just wages and working conditions for Farm Laborers.

The Nelsons began to experiment with more deliberate voluntary simplicity in an off-the-grid home in Ojo Caliente in New Mexico in the early 1970s. They moved to Deerfield, Massachusetts, in 1974, building a 16′×24′ (36 m^{2}) cabin with salvaged materials and without electricity or plumbing, and growing the majority of their own food on a half-acre (2,000 m^{2}) of land. Eventually they came to live on less than $4,000 per year. During this time they were some of the founders of such things as the Valley Community Land Trust, the Pioneer Valley War Tax Resisters, and the Greenfield Farmer's Market.

From 1989 to 1993, the Nelsons helped to resist the IRS seizure and sale of the home of war tax resisters Randy Kehler and Betsy Corner.

Wally annually participated in the war-tax protest in front of the Greenfield Post office on Tax day.

== Death ==
Nelson Died on May 23, 2002, in Greenfield, Massachusetts at the age of 93.

== Sources ==
- "Juanita Nelson - 1943-1946: Juanita meets Wally Nelson". First Person Oral Histories.
- "Wally Nelson, a committed activist". African American Registry. March 29, 2012. Archived from the original on March 30, 2017.
- Michaels, Sheila. "Wally Nelson (1909–2002)". Civil Rights Movement Archive.
- Elmer, Jerry (March 7, 2011). "The "first" freedom ride?". Fellowship of Reconciliation. Archived from the original on April 20, 2016.
- Mills, Billy Joe (December 8, 2006). "Radical Stories #1–Wally Nelson". Urbanagora. Archived from the original on March 22, 2012.
