= Max Sandin =

American radical peace activist (1889–1971)

Max Sandin (June 3, 1889–September 14, 1971) was an anti-war activist who was penalized by the United States government during both World Wars for refusal to cooperate with military conscription. He also refused federal income taxes for the same reason, beginning in 1943. A resident of Cleveland, Sandin worked as a house painter and paperhanger.

== Early life and draft refusal ==
Born in Czarist Russia, Sandin fled to the United States in 1910 to avoid forced conscription. When Sandin was drafted into the U.S. military during World War I, he declared himself a conscientious objector. United States law did not afford him an exemption, as his objection was political, not religious. At Camp Funston, he and other resisters were subjected to brutality. In 1918, for refusing to obey an order to perform military duties in wartime, Sandin was sentenced to be executed by firing squad. President Wilson commuted that sentence to a maximum of 15 years' imprisonment at Fort Leavenworth. Sandin was paroled on June 24, 1919, after the war ended.

In 1943, Sandin was again imprisoned for refusing to register for the World War II draft.

== War tax resistance ==
In 1943, Sandin began to refuse to pay taxes that would be destined for military spending. He continued to refuse for the rest of his life. In 1949, he joined the war tax resistance pledge of Peacemakers, the first non-sectarian organized war tax resistance movement in the United States.

In 1961, the government began to seize Sandin's Social Security benefits and small pension for back taxes, leaving him destitute. In response, he began a sit-down protest and hunger strike at the U.S. Treasury building. The United States Secret Service arrested him and sought a psychiatric evaluation. Sandin was judged sane and released in a few days.

== Other actions ==
Sandin also took part in a blockade designed to stop the deployment of a Polaris nuclear-weapon-armed submarine in 1960. Earlier in life he was associated with the Young People's Socialist League and the Socialist Party. A lifelong laborer, he also worked as an organizer for the Painters' Union. With the assistance of a friend, Sandin wrote an autobiography, but it was not published until 2024, with further editing by War Resisters League stalwarts, Ruth Benn and Ed Hedemann, and a foreword by Randy Kehler. A resident of Cleveland, Sandin died in 1971, at age 82.
