= Bargen (surname) =

Bargen is a German surname, often used with the nobiliary particle "von" (of). Notable people with the surname include:

- Benny Bargen (1901–1972), Ukrainian-American inventor and economics professor
- Daniel von Bargen (1950–2015), American character actor
- Hans von Bargen (1914–1944), German Luftwaffe pilot
