= Judith Ehrlich =

American filmmaker

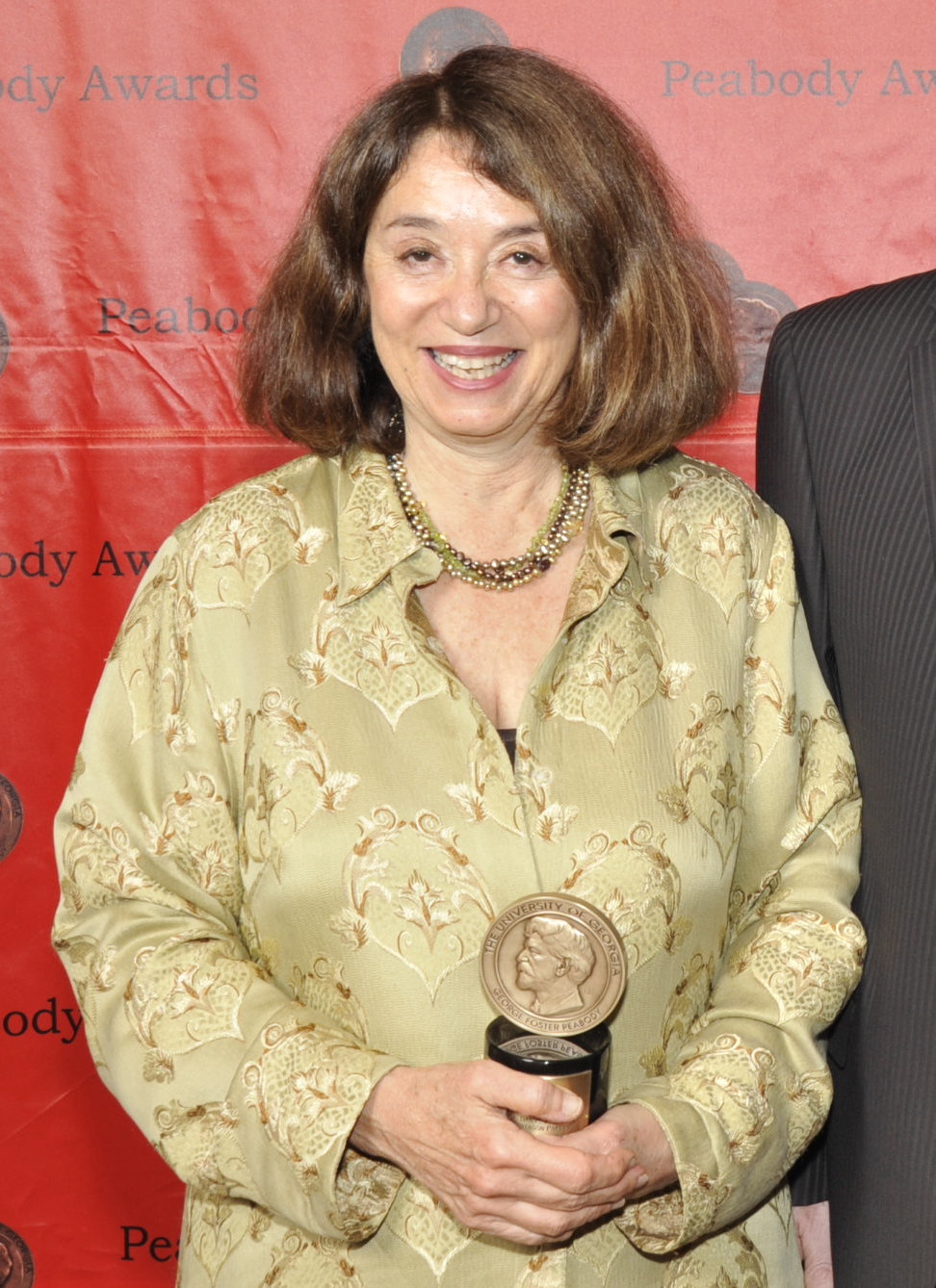
- Judith Ehrlich in 2011 at the Peabody Awards
- Born: {08/30/1948}
- Occupation: Filmmaker
- Writing career
- Genre: Documentary
- Notable works: The Most Dangerous Man in America; The Good War and Those Who Fought It
- Notable awards: Peabody Award; IDFA Special Jury Award
- Website: judithehrlich.com

Judith Ehrlich (born 1948) is an American film director, writer, and producer. Her work includes co-directing the 2009 documentary The Most Dangerous Man in America, which was nominated for Best Documentary Feature at the 82nd Academy Awards, won the Special Jury Award at the IDFA, won a Peabody Award, and was nominated for an Emmy Award for Exceptional Merit In Nonfiction Filmmaking.

== Biography ==
After working as a teacher and curriculum developer, Ehrlich began creating documentaries in the 1980s. In the 1990s, she began work for National Public Radio that included research into American history with a focus on pacifism. Some of this research was incorporated into the documentary The Good War and Those Who Refused to Fight It, about conscientious objectors during World War II, that she wrote and directed with Rick Tejeda-Flores. The documentary features several conscientious objectors, including Stephen Cary, Bill Sutherland, David Dellinger, and Lew Ayres, is narrated by Ed Asner and includes archival footage. The film was completed in 2000 and broadcast on PBS in January 2002.

For the 2009 documentary The Most Dangerous Man in America, Ehrlich and her co-director Rick Goldsmith have said they began speaking with Daniel Ellsberg in 2004 about the development of a film, and then spent several years conducting research and obtaining access to archival footage before they began filming in 2007.

In 2020, she released her documentary, The Boys Who Said No!, about activism in the 1960s and 1970s in opposition to the Vietnam War.
