= Marion Bromley =

American civil rights and peace activist (1912–1996)

Marion Bromley née Coddington (October 10, 1912 – January 21, 1996) was a pioneer of the modern American tax resistance movement and a civil rights activist.

== Tax resistance ==
In 1948 Bromley left the staff of the Fellowship of Reconciliation (where she had been A.J. Muste's secretary) to avoid the withholding of taxes on her paycheck. Bromley helped found the group Peacemakers later that year, and concentrated her focus on the organization of war tax resistance by that group.

Over the years her refusal to pay her taxes has appeared in the news.

The first war tax resistance "how to" guide, Handbook on Nonpayment of War Taxes, was published by Marion and Ernest Bromley in 1963.

Bromley participated in the first meeting of the National War Tax Resistance Coordinating Committee in 1982.

In the 1970s the Internal Revenue Service tried and failed to seize their home for non-payment of taxes. In 1977 the War Resisters League gave the Bromleys its annual Peace Award.

== Desegregation activism ==
She participated in the campaign to desegregate the Coney Island amusement park in 1952. She was with a black couple in a car that attempted to gain access to the park but was attacked by an anti-desegregationist mob (the occupants of the car were charged with disorderly conduct).

== Personal life ==
She married Ernest Bromley in 1948.
