= Eroseanna Robinson =

Eroseanna "Sis" Robinson (1924–1976) was an African-American social worker, track star, activist and member of the Peacemakers who organized for desegregation and against the U.S. military in the 1950s and 1960s. In particular, she was an advocate of nonviolent resistance strategies. Robinson went on hunger strike or risked violence and arrest multiple times, but nonetheless won various victories for equality.

In addition to her activism, Robinson was a successful track runner. These two interests collided when she was chosen to represent the United States in a track meet against Russia and refused to participate because she felt she was being used as a "political pawn" by appearing alongside white athletes, giving the international community the false impression that white and black people were treated equally inside of the United States.

== Activism ==
=== Integration of Skateland ===
In 1952, Eroseanna Robinson worked at a community center in Cleveland when she decided that she would help to desegregate a public skating facility called Skateland. She pursued a non-violent plan. In her first attempt, she brought children—two black children and one white child—from the community center at which she worked, to skate. White teenagers harassed the children. Over the next few days, Robinson returned with friends who supported her cause but she was continually tripped and physically assaulted by white customers at Skateland. At one point, Robinson required urgent medical attention after she was shoved, causing her to break an arm. Skateland's management and security teams did not intervene on Robinson's behalf.

=== War Tax Resistance ===
In early 1960, Robinson held another nonviolent protest by refusing to pay federal taxes as a way of showing her lack of support for the United States military. Her refusal to pay taxes caused her to be sentenced to a year of imprisonment, but she used the process as an opportunity to engage in nonviolent protest. When she was sentenced, Robinson had to be carried into the courtroom on a stretcher because she refused to walk. Once she was in prison, she held a three-month fast. She was force fed through a tube and then released nine months before her sentence was complete.

=== Restaurant Integration ===
In 1961, Eroseanna Robinson travelled along Route 40 in Maryland with Wally and Juanita Nelson. The three decided to stop for dinner in Elkton, Maryland, but a diner refused to serve them. The trio refused to leave until police came and arrested them, putting them in county jail. In jail, they refused to appear in court or eat. Their story was picked up by local newspapers which dubbed them the "Elkton Three." Since the trio refused to cooperate with the court proceedings, they were given $50 fines and released. Their case sparked a local movement for desegregation that ended up gaining then Maryland Governor Millar Tawes' attention and led to eventual desegregation of restaurants along Route 40.

== Legacy ==
Although not widely-known among other African-American civil rights activists, Robinson was instrumental in integrating several public spaces across the country in the early days of the Civil Rights Movement. She is perhaps most remembered for her methods of nonviolent resistance, which were deployed in sit-ins and other pro-integration demonstrations throughout the latter part of the Civil Rights Movement.

Her work to integrate restaurants along Maryland's Route 40 had international ramifications, as foreign diplomats would often travel the road in trips from Washington, D.C. to New York City. In 1958, Ghanaian politician Komla Gbedema was denied service at a restaurant on Route 40, which embarrassed the Eisenhower administration. With the slogan "49 Miles of Highway and No Place to Stop and Eat," Robinson, the Nelsons, and others were able to integrate these Maryland restaurants, which at the time hurt the United States' international reputation. During several of Robinson's hunger strikes, she also garnered headlines in African American publications, who lauded her relentless commitment to achieve racial justice.

Robinson stands as an icon of the war tax resistance movement. The National War Tax Resistance Coordinating Committee, a grassroots movement with the aim of educating American taxpayers of their rights to resist making tax contributions to war efforts, touts Robinson as a foundational figure in their movement.

Social work, as a profession, has a history of leadership within social justice movements that dates back to the work of activists like Robinson. Today, social workers carry on this legacy of activism through grassroots movements such as RISE.
