= Randy Kehler =

American pacifist (1944–2024)

- Born: July 16, 1944; Bronxville, New York, U.S.
- Died: July 21, 2024 (aged 80); Shelburne Falls, Massachusetts, U.S.
- Education: Harvard University
- Spouse: Betsy Corner
- Children: 1

Gordon Randall Kehler (July 16, 1944 – July 21, 2024) was an American pacifist, tax resister, and social justice advocate. Kehler objected to America's involvement in the Vietnam War and refused to cooperate with the draft. He, along with his wife Betsy Corner, stopped paying federal income taxes in protest of war and military spending, a decision that led to the Internal Revenue Service (IRS) seizing their house in 1989.

Kehler was involved in several anti-war organizations in the 1960s and 1970s, and in the early 1980s was a leader in the movement against nuclear weapons.

== Early life and education ==
Kehler was born on July 16, 1944, in Bronxville, New York, the second of four children, and was raised in Scarsdale. His father, a lifelong Republican, was an executive with the Arnold Baking Company, and his mother was a homemaker. Kehler attended Phillips Exeter Academy and graduated from Harvard University in 1967 with a degree in government. While at Harvard, Kehler became involved with the Harlem chapter of Congress of Racial Equality (CORE). Kehler has credited Martin Luther King Jr.'s "I Have a Dream" during the March on Washington for Jobs and Freedom in 1963 with shaping his interest in radical politics. Kehler briefly entered Stanford University as a graduate student, but left after three weeks to engage full time in anti-war and civil rights work.

His bus ride to the 1963 demonstration was also consequential in his becoming a radical pacifist, as Kehler recounted in the foreword to I Was Sentenced to Be Shot: Autobiography of a Political Objector by Max Sandin. On that trip, Kehler met Sandin, a World War I conscientious objector and lifelong peace activist, which eventually inspired Kehler's involvement in the 2024 publication of Sandin's long-lost autobiography.

== Opposition to the Vietnam War ==
In 1969, during the Vietnam War, Kehler returned his draft card to the Selective Service System. He refused to seek exemption as a conscientious objector because he felt that doing so would be a form of cooperation with the US government's actions in Vietnam. After being called for induction and refusing to submit, he was charged with a federal crime. Found guilty at trial, Kehler served twenty-two months of a two-year sentence.

A 2020 documentary film, The Boys Who Said No!, features footage of, and an interview with, Kehler as one of several Vietnam-era draft resisters discussing that form of anti-war activism.

Daniel Ellsberg's exposure to Kehler in August 1969 (as Kehler was preparing to submit to his sentence) at the 13th Triennial Meeting of the War Resisters International, held at Haverford College, was a pivotal event in Ellsberg's decision to copy and release the Pentagon Papers.

== Anti-nuclear activism ==
Kehler became active in anti-nuclear proliferation and nuclear disarmament movements while leading a grassroots campaign in western Massachusetts to support the concept of a nuclear freeze. His efforts led to his meeting fellow activist Randy Forsberg, who was leading a similar effort at a national level. From 1981 through 1984, Kehler served as Executive Director of the National Nuclear Weapons Freeze Campaign.

Kehler advocated against the use of nuclear power and led campaigns for the closure of nuclear power plants, including Vermont Yankee in Vernon, Vermont.

== Resistance of federal income tax ==
From 1977 onward, Kehler and his wife Betsy Corner refused to pay their federal income taxes in protest of war and military expenditures; they continued to pay their state and local taxes, and donated the money they owed in federal income taxes to charity. This led to the seizure of their house in Colrain, Massachusetts by the IRS in 1989. The home was subsequently purchased by the federal government. Kehler and Corner, along with supporters from the local community, struggled for years with the government and with another couple who attempted to purchase and move in to the home. The events were documented in the 1997 documentary film An Act of Conscience.

== Personal life and death ==
Kehler and Corner married in 1976. They had one daughter. An earlier marriage to Jane Schulman ended in divorce. Kehler died at his home in Shelburne Falls, Massachusetts, on July 21, 2024 at the age of 80.
