= Ralph T. Templin =

American activist (1896–1984)

- Born: 1896
- Died: 1984 (aged 87–88)
- Occupations: Missionary, educator, publisher, and social activist

Ralph T. Templin (1896–1984) was an American missionary in India, and an educator, publisher, and social activist.

In 1954, he became the first white minister to join the then all-black Methodist Lexington Conference.

== Missionary work in India ==
Templin worked in India from 1925 to 1940, where he became an admirer of Mahatma Gandhi's philosophies. He was active with the kristagraha (Christian nonviolence) movement there. Because he would not desist from promoting Gandhi's nationalist direct action, the British occupation government expelled Templin from the country.

On his return to the United States, he founded the Harlem Ashram with Jay Holmes Smith to put Gandhi's philosophies to work in that community of African Americans and Puerto Rican immigrants in New York. He also became director of the decentralist, nonviolent School of Living in Suffern, New York.

== Activism ==
Although he served as an aviator in World War I, Templin refused to register for the draft during World War II, and later refused to pay taxes for war expenses. In 1948, he was one of the founders of Peacemakers, the first non-sectarian war tax resistance organization in the United States.

In 1955 he engaged in a 12-day protest fast following the executions of Ethel and Julius Rosenberg. He also fasted after the assassination of Martin Luther King Jr.

He refused to appear when he was summoned before the House Unamerican Activities Committee in 1965.

He lobbied for Puerto Rican independence and supported independence fighters like Ruth Mary Reynolds.

In 1968, he defended the black power movement to white audiences.

== Works ==
- Between Two Worlds: The Story of a Missionary's Experiences in International Fellowship (Fellowship Publications, 1948)
- Symposium, is Puerto Rico Fully Self-governing? (1953)
- Democracy and Nonviolence: The Role of the Individual in World Crisis (Porter Sargent, 1965)
- "Emancipation from Prejudice" Journal of human relations Vol. 14 (1966) p. 74–87
- American's Manifesto on Our Unfinished Business of Colonialism: A Call to Free Puerto Rico Now (1967)

== See also ==
- "Guide to the Ralph T. Templin Papers". United Methodist Church: General Commission on Archives and History.
