= Benny Bargen =

Ukrainian-American inventor (1901–1972)

- Бернард Барген
- Born: Bernhard Bargen; December 10, 1901
- Died: November 14, 1972 (aged 70)
- Occupation(s): Inventor, economics professor

Bernhard Bargen (Note: Ukrainian: Бернард Барген, romanized: Bernard Barhen) (10 December 1901 – 14 November 1972) was a Ukrainian-American inventor and economics professor at Bethel College (Kansas).

Bargen was infected with polio as an infant, and for the remainder of his life his legs were mostly paralyzed as a result.

A Mennonite pacifist, Bargen kept his income deliberately low so that he would not pay income taxes that were destined for military spending. Later he joined the Peacemakers war tax resistance movement that emerged in 1948.

Bargen was involved for a time with the Woodcrest Bruderhof Community. Bargen returned at the end of his life to the Bruderhof Community at New Meadow Run in Farmington, Pennsylvania.
