= Vivien Kellems =

American businesswoman (1896–1975)

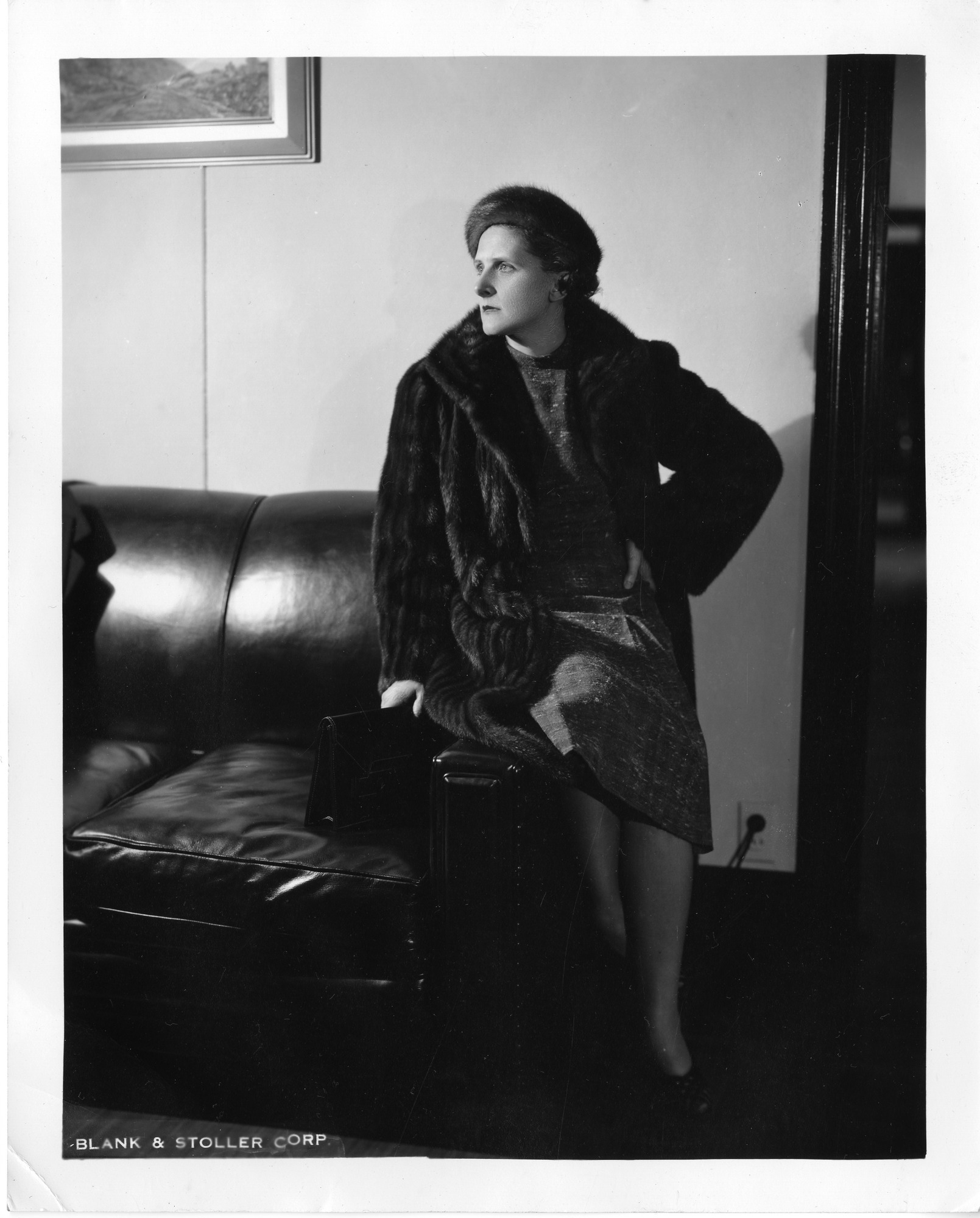
- Born: Anna Vivien Kellems; June 7, 1896; Des Moines, Iowa, U.S.
- Died: January 25, 1975 (aged 78); Brentwood, Los Angeles, California, U.S.
- Education: University of Oregon (B.A.); Columbia University (Ph.D.); University of Edinburgh (Ph.D.)

Vivien Kellems (June 7, 1896 – January 25, 1975) was an American industrialist, inventor, public speaker, and political candidate who became known for her battle with the Federal government of the United States over withholding under 26 U.S.C. §3402 and other aspects of income tax in the United States. She was also a fervent supporter of voting reform and the Equal Rights Amendment.

== Life and career ==
Born in Des Moines, Iowa, to David Clinton Kellems and Amanda Louise (née Flint), Kellems received a BA from the University of Oregon in 1918, where she became the only woman on the debate team. She went on to earn a master's degree in economics and worked towards a PhD at Columbia University and the University of Edinburgh.

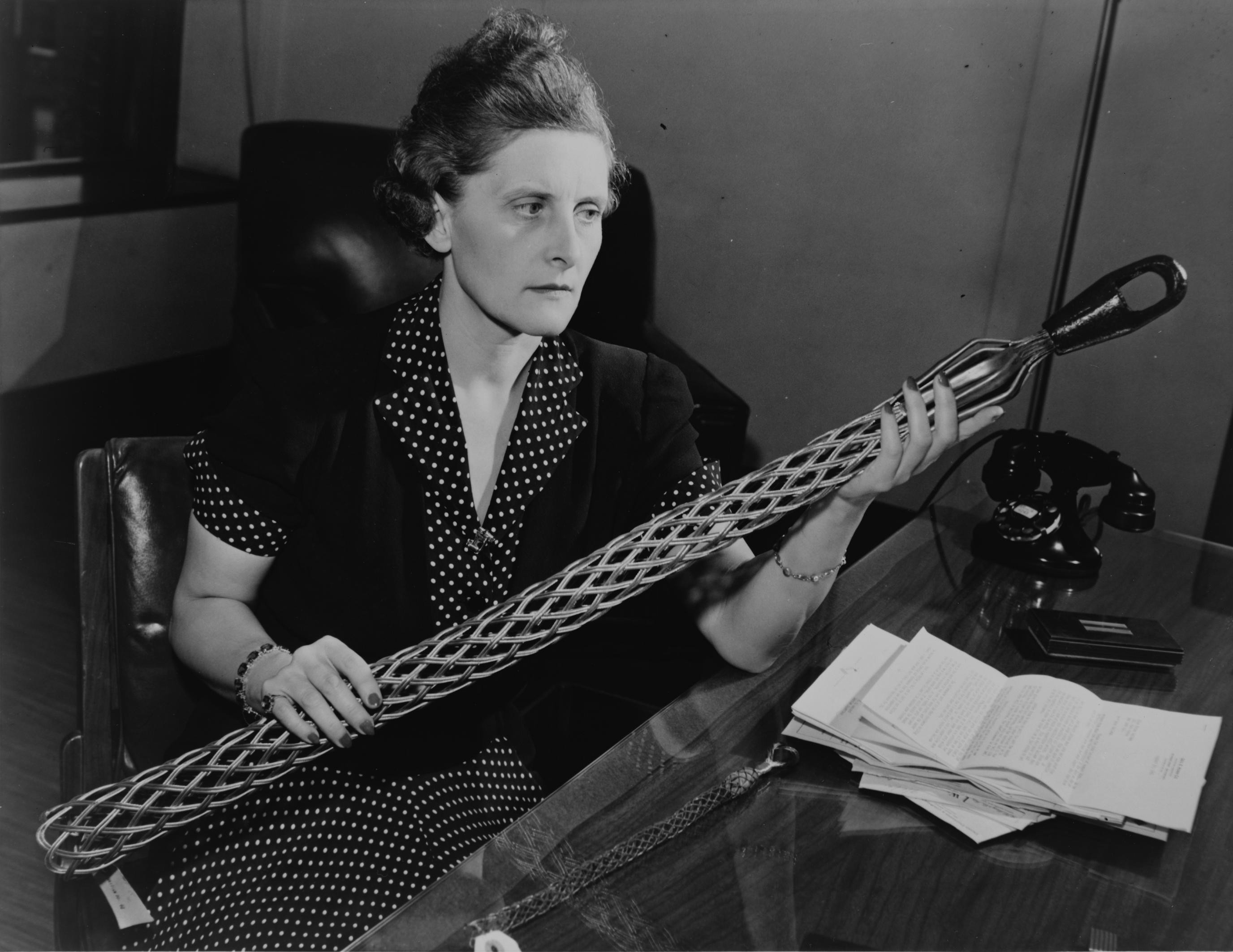
Vivien Kellems in 1941, holding one of her company's patented cable grips.

In 1927, she founded Kellems Cable Grips, Inc. in Connecticut to produce a patented cable grip invented with her brother Edgar Eugene Kellems. The endless-weave grip was an improved version of the wire mesh grip in use at the time to pull, position, route and relieve strain of electrical cables. In 1928, Kellems solicited Queens Electric Light and Power Company and the Brooklyn Edison Company for a total of twenty orders.

== Tax resistance ==
In 1948, Kellems refused to collect withholding taxes from her employees on behalf of the government, stating, "If they wanted me to be their agent, they'd have to pay me, and I want a badge." She was interviewed about her tax opposition on "Meet the Press" on September 26, 1948, at a time when women rarely appeared on the show. She has described herself in her book Toil, Taxes and Trouble. The Kellems case is presented also by economist Murray Rothbard in his book For a New Liberty:

The withholding feature of the income tax is a still more clear-cut instance of involuntary servitude. For as the intrepid Connecticut industrialist Vivien Kellems argued years ago, the employer is forced to expend time, labor, and money in the business of deducting and transmitting his employees' taxes to the federal and state governments—yet the employer is not recompensed for this expenditure. —Murray Newton Rothbard in For a New Liberty

She surrendered her case when her continued pursuit of it threatened to bankrupt her company. She continued to challenge that and other aspects of the income tax for the rest of her life, saying in a 1975 Los Angeles Times interview, "Our tax law is a 1,598-page hydra-headed monster and I'm going to attack and attack and attack until I have ironed out every fault in it." From 1965 until her death, Kellems reportedly sent only blank returns to the Internal Revenue Service. Her stands against the income tax system have made Kellems an admired figure in the tax protester movement.

In April 1951, the U.S. District Court for the District of Connecticut ruled that Kellems was entitled to a refund of income taxes assessed against her employees for which the government had been overpaid (that is, the tax had been collected from both the employees and Kellems). The Court also ruled that Kellems and her co-plaintiff David Kellems were not entitled to a refund of penalties they had paid on account of their refusal to withhold taxes, as the Kellems were unable to show that their refusal was with reasonable cause under the law. For another period in question, a jury did find that Kellems' conduct was not willful, and that she was therefore entitled to a refund of penalty she had paid.

In 1973, the United States Tax Court ruled that Kellems was liable for a deficiency in federal income tax for the year 1965. The Court rejected her argument that the tax was unconstitutional under the Fifth, Ninth, Fourteenth, and Sixteenth Amendments and article I, section 2 clause 3 and article I, section 9, clause 4 of the U.S. Constitution.

In 1975, she died at age 78. The government made her heirs pay $265,000 in back taxes.

Kellems was a candidate for office in Connecticut a number of times, running for the United States Senate in 1952, 1956, and 1958 and for Governor of Connecticut in 1954. She ran as an Independent Republican in her first two attempts at office and solely as an independent in the latter two. Her best showing came in her 1952 race for Senate, winning 22,268 or 2.04% of the votes cast.

== See also ==
- Tax resistance in the United States
