= Federal telephone excise tax =

United States tax

The federal telephone excise tax is a statutory federal excise tax imposed under the Internal Revenue Code in the United States under 26 U.S.C. § 4251 on amounts paid for certain "communications services". The tax was to be imposed on the person paying for the communications services (such as a customer of a telephone company) but, under 26 U.S.C. § 4291, is collected from the customer by the "person receiving any payment for facilities or services" on which the tax is imposed (i.e., is collected by the telephone company, which files a quarterly Form 720 excise return and forwards the tax to the Internal Revenue Service).

== History ==
Although in popular belief the telephone excise tax has been in place continuously since the Spanish–American War, it has actually been repealed and reinstated several times, usually in times of war or economic crisis. Because of this connection to war, the tax has been a frequent target of war tax resisters.

=== Spanish–American War ===
In late April 1898, Congress passed a resolution declaring that a state of war had existed since April 21, 1898, between the United States and Spain. Although the Spanish–American War was short, its financing needs resulted in a federal budget deficit. In the landmark case of Pollock v. Farmers' Loan and Trust Co. the Supreme Court had nullified the income tax of 1894. Many in Congress felt that tariff increases could create too much disturbance with industry. As a result, the leaders in Congress felt that the revenues required for military expenditures either should come from increases in existing domestic taxes or supplements of new taxes of the same type. Thus, in the War Revenue Act of 1898, an excise tax on telephone service was introduced for the first time in 1898. The tax was repealed in 1902, at the end of the Spanish–American related Philippine–American War.

=== Prelude to World War I ===
In August 1914, war broke out in Europe resulting in a precipitous fall in imports to the United States from Europe. One result from the fall in imports was that business profits were reduced, and revenues from the corporation income tax declined. This fall in imports also reduced the federal government's customs receipts. On September 4, 1914, President Wilson called upon Congress to raise an additional $100 million through "internal" taxes (in contrast to customs duties). These revenues were needed not only because of the loss of revenues but also because of added federal spending related to the war being fought in Europe. In response, Congress passed the Emergency Internal Revenue Tax Act of 1914. The Act was mostly a renewal of the excises contained in the Spanish–American War Revenue Act. It included a tax of 1 cent for telephone calls costing more than 15 cents. The taxes instituted under this Act were initially set to expire on December 31, 1915. However, on December 17, 1915, Congress passed a joint resolution that continued the taxes instituted in 1914 through December 31, 1916. After that time, while revenue needs continued (for "preparedness"), the Revenue Act of September 1916 did not extend the tax on telephone service.

=== World War I ===
With the entrance of the United States into World War I, revenue needs were greatly increased. Both parties worked together to produce a tax bill. Included in the War Revenue Act of October 3, 1917, was a tax of "5 cents upon each telegraph, telephone, or radio, dispatch, message, or conversation, which originates within the United States, and for the transmission of which a charge of 15 cents or more is imposed." Work on the Revenue Act of 1918 had nearly been completed when the Armistice was signed on November 11, 1918. Although World War I had ended, Congress recognized budget expenditures could be expected to decline in the long term but that reductions in expenditures would not occur in the short term. Pay for U.S. military forces could be expected to continue for some time and there was a need to provide capital for reconstruction to U.S. allies in Europe. Thus, this tax measure was redrafted. The redrafted Act not only continued the telephone excise tax but also did so at increased rates that were graduated for the first time. While this Act is referred to as the Revenue Act of 1918, it was not passed until early in 1919. The tax continued until it was repealed in 1924.

=== Great Depression ===
Today's telephone excise tax derives from the Revenue Bill of 1932. Since then, it has been reauthorized 29 times. The 1932 Act was passed in response to a federal budget deficit brought about because of a decline in income tax receipts caused by an economic depression rather than as a result of war. Initially the tax was levied only on interstate (long-distance) service. The telephone excise tax was extended five times (between 1933 and 1941) before the tax was first applied to local telephone service.

=== World War II ===
Just prior to the entrance of the United States into World War II, the Revenue Act of 1941 was passed into law. In addition to increasing the rate on long-distance calls, it also imposed the tax on "general" or local telephone service for the first time. The rate of tax for local telephone service was set at 6 percent of the amount paid by subscribers while that for long-distance calls was set at 5 cents for each 50 cents or fraction thereof, if the cost of the message was greater than 24 cents. Other legislation was subsequently enacted during World War II — the Revenue Act of 1942 and the Revenue Act of 1943. The tax rates on telephone service reached their all-time high under provisions of the Revenue Act of 1943. Rates were 15 percent on local telephone calls and 25 percent (on messages which cost more than 24 cents) on long-distance calls. The Revenue Act of 1943 also provided for the increased excise tax rates to expire. In the case of the excise taxes on telephone service, the law provided that the increased rates would end six months after the "date of termination of hostilities in the present war." The law defined the termination date as that date proclaimed by either the President or the date specified in a concurrent resolution of the two Houses of Congress, whichever is the earlier. In a reversal of this position, the Excise Tax Act of 1947 continued the rates indefinitely.

=== Codification in the Internal Revenue Code ===
With the enactment of the Internal Revenue Code of 1954, the levies imposed on both local and long-distance calls (for messages costing more than 24 cents) were reduced from 15 percent to 10 percent. The Excise Tax Technical Changes Act of 1958 made no changes in the tax rate on telephone calls, but did remove the 24 cents limitation first provided for in 1942. Both local and long-distance calling were subject to the same tax rate for the first time.

The Tax Rate Extension Act of 1959 provided for the termination of the tax on local telephone service on July 1, 1960. However, a series of one-year extensions was subsequently enacted each year until 1965, when the Excise Tax Reduction Act became law. In 1965, Congress enacted comprehensive legislation which repealed many existing federal excise taxes and authorized the reduction and, in some instances, the gradual reduction and ultimate repeal of other excises over a period of years. This Act authorized the reduction of the 10 percent tax on local and long-distance telephone service to 3 percent which became effective on January 1, 1966. In addition to the reduced rate, the Act provided for the gradual reduction and elimination of the tax on January 1, 1969.

=== Vietnam War ===
By 1966, however, the federal government's revenue requirements had increased due to escalation of the Vietnam War. President Johnson requested that Congress enact legislation to restore the rate of the telephone excise tax to the 10 percent rate in effect prior to January 1, 1966, and that successive reductions which had been authorized by the Excise Tax Reduction Act of 1965 be deferred. Accordingly, Congress enacted the Tax Adjustment Act of 1966. That Act authorized the restoration of the former 10 percent rate on these services beginning on April 1, 1966, for a two-year period (until April 1, 1968), at which time it was to be reduced to 1 percent, before repeal on January 1, 1969.

Again in 1967, President Johnson urged postponement of scheduled reductions in telephone excise taxes as part of his tax program designed to meet the rising cost of the war and increasing domestic needs. A joint Congressional resolution was approved which temporarily extended the 10 percent rate from March 31, 1968, until April 30, 1968. This temporary extension provided Congress time to complete action on the Revenue and Expenditure Control Act of 1968. The 1968 Act continued the 10 percent tax retroactively from April 30, 1968, until December 31, 1969, with provision for its subsequent reduction and repeal by calendar year 1973.

Passage of the Tax Reform Act of 1969 again granted a one-year extension (this time until December 31, 1970) of the telephone tax at the rate of 10 percent. With passage of the Excise, Estate and Gift Tax Adjustment Act of 1970 the 10 percent rate was extended through calendar years 1971 and 1972. The tax was then to be reduced by 1 percent each year until the tax was scheduled for repeal on January 1, 1982. However, prior to repeal, the tax was extended in 1980 at a 2 percent rate until 1982 when it was scheduled to be reduced to 1 percent before repeal in 1983. In 1981 the tax was extended again. This time the tax was extended at the 1 percent rate for two additional years with repeal scheduled for 1985. However, in the following year, 1982, the tax was increased to a 3 percent rate, with repeal rescheduled for the beginning of calendar year 1986.

In April 1984 both the House of Representatives and the Senate passed legislation calling for a continuation of the current excise tax on telephone service at a 3 percent rate for an additional two years. The legislation enacted provided for repeal in 1988. However, before repeal the tax was again extended at the 3 percent rate this time for an additional three years.

President George H. W. Bush's budget proposal for fiscal year 1991 called for the permanent extension of the telephone excise tax at the prevailing rate of 3%. Since the tax had been a continuous revenue source since 1932 and because of large continuing budget deficits, Congress concurred with the President's recommendation and made the tax a permanent part of the tax revenue structure with the enactment of the Revenue Reconciliation Act of 1990.

On September 14, 2000, the House of Representatives took up legislation which included the repeal of the telephone excise tax. Under provisions contained in H.R. 4516, which was a package of both spending and tax bills, the 3% tax on communication services would be immediately repealed. After passage by the Congress, President Clinton vetoed this legislation.

The general excise tax has so far cost consumers about $300 billion, says the Congressional Research Service.

Until the middle of 2006, the tax was collected by telephone companies with respect to local and long-distance telephone services. Collection of the tax on most long-distance service was then halted due to a controversy that erupted over the wording of the law and the way telephone service is billed today.

== Controversy and litigation ==
On May 10, 2005, the American Bankers Insurance Group won an important victory in the fight against the telephone excise tax, when the United States Court of Appeals for the Eleventh Circuit reversed the decision of the United States District Court for the Southern District of Florida, which had held that the services that ABIG purchased from AT&T were taxable.

This was one of several U.S. Court of Appeals cases that the Internal Revenue Service lost on the same issue. The IRS withdrew only after losing several of such cases and winning none (at the Appeals level or higher).

A key issue in the controversy was the legal definition of "toll telephone service" as defined in section 4252(b) of the Internal Revenue Code, which provides (in part):

b) Toll telephone service

For purposes of this subchapter, the term "toll telephone service" means—

(1) a telephonic quality communication for which

(A) there is a toll charge which varies in amount with the distance and elapsed transmission time of each individual communication [ . . . . ]

=== Concession by the Internal Revenue Service ===
On 25 May 2006, the Internal Revenue Service (IRS) issued IRS Notice 2006-50, 2006 I.R.B. 25, which stated in part:

[... ] the Internal Revenue Service will follow the holdings of Am. Bankers Ins. Group v. United States, 408 F.3d 1328 (11th Cir. 2005) (ABIG); OfficeMax, Inc. v. United States, 428 F.3d 583 (6th Cir. 2005); Nat'l R.R. Passenger Corp. v. United States, 431 F.3d 374 (D.C. Cir. 2005) (Amtrak); Fortis v. United States, 2006 U.S. App. LEXIS 10749 (2d Cir. Apr. 27, 2006); and Reese Bros. v. United States, 2006 U.S. App. LEXIS 11468 (3d Cir. May 9, 2006). These cases hold that a telephonic communication for which there is a toll charge that varies with elapsed transmission time and not distance (time-only service) is not taxable toll telephone service as defined in §4252(b)(1) of the Internal Revenue Code. As a result, amounts paid for time-only service are not subject to the tax imposed by §4251. Accordingly, the government will no longer litigate this issue [....] [emphasis added]

The IRS also provided the following definitions in Notice 2006-50:

Bundled service (non-taxable)
Bundled service is local and long distance service provided under a plan that does not separately state the charge for the local telephone service. Bundled service includes, for example, Voice over Internet Protocol service, prepaid telephone cards, and plans that provide both local and long distance service for either a flat monthly fee or a charge that varies with the elapsed transmission time for which the service is used. Telecommunications companies provide bundled service for both landline and wireless (cellular) service.

Long distance service (non-taxable)
Long distance service is telephonic quality communication with persons whose telephones are outside the local telephone system of the caller.

Local-only service (continues to be taxable)
Local-only service is local telephone service, as defined in §4252(a), provided under a plan that does not include long distance telephone service or that separately states the charge for local service on its bill to customers. The term also includes services and facilities provided in connection with service described in the preceding sentence even though these services and facilities may also be used with long distance service. See, for example, Rev. Rul. 72-537, 1972-2 C.B. 574 (telephone amplifier); Rev. Rul. 73-171, 1973-1 C.B. 445 (automatic call distributing equipment); and Rev. Rul. 73-269, 1973-1 C.B. 444 (special telephone).

IRS Notice 2006-50 also states (in part):

Collectors [e.g., telephone companies] are directed to cease collecting and paying over tax under §4251 on nontaxable service that is billed after July 31, 2006, and are not required to report to the IRS any refusal by their customers to pay any tax on nontaxable service that is billed after May 25, 2006. Collectors should not pay over to the IRS any tax on nontaxable service that is billed after July 31, 2006. [....] [T]he IRS will deny all taxpayer requests for refund of tax on nontaxable service that was billed after July 31, 2006. All such requests should be directed to the collector [e.g., to the telephone company]. In addition, collectors may repay to taxpayers the tax on nontaxable service that was billed before August 1, 2006, but are not required to repay such tax. [...] Collectors must continue to collect and pay over tax under §4251 on amounts paid for local only service.

The wording of the statute itself (section 4251) was not changed or repealed. (As a general rule, a U.S. Federal statute can be repealed only by another statute subsequently enacted by the U.S. Congress.) The change was a change in the enforcement policy of the Internal Revenue Service to conform to the literal language of the statute and the court decisions interpreting the statute. Treasury Secretary John W. Snow stated in a prepared release, "Today is a good day for American taxpayers; it marks the beginning of the end of an outdated, antiquated tax that has survived a century beyond its original purpose, and by now should have been ancient history." Snow also called on the United States Congress "to terminate the remainder of this antique tax by repealing the excise tax on local service as well."

On January 25, 2011, Rep. Dean Heller (R-Nev.) introduced H.R. 428, a bill "To amend the Internal Revenue Code of 1986 to repeal the excise tax on telephone and other communications services"; it was referred to the House Ways and Means Committee, but was not enacted.

== Credits against federal income tax ==
Individuals and other entities including non-profit organizations and businesses were able to receive a credit for the unlawfully collected tax when they filed their 2006 federal income tax returns. Certain persons who paid the long-distance tax on service billed after February 28, 2003, but before August 1, 2006, were eligible for the credit. The three-year lookback period coincides with the statute of limitations for tax refunds. The refund was available to all individuals and corporations which paid the tax, including the deceased and defunct organizations, until July 27, 2012.

However, the IRS stated in 2007 that millions of taxpayers failed to take the credit, leaving $4 billion still to be claimed. The credit can be claimed by those who neglected to take it, but only by amending a 2006 tax return.

The IRS offered two methods for computing the amount of the credit due to individuals:

- Standard amount method. Consumers may elect a pre-determined credit, based on the number of exemptions claimed on their returns. The amounts of the credit are $30 for a person filing a return with one exemption, $40 for two exemptions, $50 for three exemptions, and $60 for four or more exemptions. This amount includes interest and is based on the tax paid by an average American household during the lookback period.
- Actual amount method. Consumers and other entities may instead elect to itemize the deduction based on the actual amount of tax paid during the lookback period. This would require locating and examining forty-one months of telephone bills to determine the proper credit amount to seek. Filing Form 8913 with the tax return is required in order to claim the actual amount. Interest will then be applied based on the average time elapsed between each quarter where tax was paid and the due date of the 2006 income tax return.

Businesses and tax exempt organizations may either claim the actual amount of excise tax by either calculating the actual amount of tax paid during the lookback period or using an estimate method. The special method involves comparing the April 2006 phone bill with the excise tax on long-distance service and the September 2006 bill without it. The percentage difference in the excise tax, subject to a 1% or 2% maximum cap, can be applied to annual or quarterly telephone bills to determine the credit. In all cases, interest will be paid on refunds.

== See also ==
- IRS
- Telephone
- Taxation in the United States
- Excise Tax
- Tax
- Use Tax
