= The Boys Who Said No! =

2020 documentary film

- Promotional release poster
- Directed by: Judith Ehrlich
- Written by: Michael Chandler; Judith Ehrlich
- Produced by: Christopher Colorado Jones; Bill Prince
- Narrated by: Michael Stewart Foley
- Edited by: Scott Walton
- Music by: Beth Custer
- Production company: InSight Films
- Release date: October 8, 2020 (MVFF)
- Running time: 90 minutes
- Country: United States
- Language: English

The Boys Who Said No! is a 2020 American documentary film directed by Judith Ehrlich about the anti-war and draft resistance movement in Oakland, California, which developed in opposition to the United States' involvement in the Vietnam War in the late 1960s and early 1970s. The film features interviews with such activists as Joan Baez, Daniel Ellsberg, David Harris, Randy Kehler, Mark Rudd, Michael Ferber, and Cleveland Sellers.

The Boys Who Said No! had its world premiere virtually at the Mill Valley Film Festival (MVFF) on October 8, 2020.
