= Walter Gormly =

American conscientious objector (1915–2000)

Walter Gormly (February 15, 1915 – February 26, 2000) was an American conscientious objector, tax resister and advocate of small-scale industry.

Walter Ford Gormly was born February 7, 1915, the middle son of Will J. and Anna L. Gormly of Mount Vernon, Iowa. After transferring from Colorado State College, he received his B.S. (1939) from Iowa State College (University) in Mechanical Engineering. While a student, Gormly was active in the Collegiate Presbyterian Church and the local chapter of the American Society of Mechanical Engineers (ASME). Because he was a conscientious objector, and because he refused to serve in government-sanctioned work camps, Gormly was incarcerated for three years during World War II in the federal prison at Sandstone, Minnesota. While in prison he staged a hunger strike, which lasted for four months and four days (during which time he was fed intravenously) before he was freed without parole.

Gormly, believing that federal tax dollars funded the military, continued his anti-war activities by refusing to pay federal income tax during the 1950s. In 1962, he staged another hunger strike in front of the Internal Revenue Service building in Des Moines, Iowa, and was once again jailed for a short time. During this period, Gormly also became very interested in food and drug issues and was a vocal opponent of fluoride. He published "Newsman's Gadfly" during the 1960s and authored a column, "Voice from the Woods". He was a member of the Society for Social Responsibility in Science (SSRS) and the Humanists of Iowa. Gormly died February 26, 2000.

== Quotes ==
In a 1991 interview, Gormly said:

Most of my life, I've been trying to save the human race from its own stupidity. I have little to show for my efforts.
