= National War Tax Resistance Coordinating Committee =

American anti-war activist group

The National War Tax Resistance Coordinating Committee (NWTRCC — usually pronounced "new-trick") is an American activist coalition that promotes tax resistance as a way to protest against and/or disassociate from war and militarism.

In 1982, the War Resisters League and the Center on Law and Pacifism organized a "National Action Conference" to discuss war tax resistance. NWTRCC was founded on September 18, 1982, by Ed Hedemann and other activists. It filled an organizational gap that had been left since the group War Tax Resistance (founded in 1969) dissolved in 1975.

Members of that group, of Conscience and Military Tax Campaign, and of Center on Law and Pacifism, among others, recognized a need to coordinate war tax resistance activities undertaken by a variety of groups in the United States. They published a legal and practical guide for war tax resistance counselors, created a list of nationwide counselors, and organized national gatherings of a diverse variety of war tax resisters.

By 1985, NWTRCC had more than 60 local or regional chapters and claimed that 20,000 Americans were engaged in some form of war tax resistance.

As the war tax resistance movement in the United States, which had been growing from the 1960s through the 1980s, shrank in the following decades, NWTRCC became less-focused on assisting local, regional, and sectarian war tax resistance groups, and more oriented to being a de facto national war tax resistance organization. The "coordinating committee" part of its name is something of a relic of its inception, as today there are few additional groups to coordinate.

== See also ==
- List of anti-war organizations
- List of peace activists
- Tax resistance in the United States
