= Maurice McCrackin =

American minister, pacifist, and civil rights activist (1905–1997)

Maurice McCrackin (1905–1997) was an American civil rights and peace activist, tax resister and Presbyterian minister. Reverend Maurice F. McCrackin was removed from his church St. Barnabas in Cincinnati's West End, for standing up for his beliefs being against the Vietnam War. Not paying his federal taxes during those years was for the same reasons, since those taxes were going towards the war effort. After his very large church, St. Barnabas, was taken away by Presbyterian hierarchy, he started the small Community Church. Many of his former parishioners followed him to the small building on Dayton Street in Cincinnati where he preached, ran services, baptized babies, and performed weddings and funerals.

He was a principled pacifist all of his life. He was active in the struggle for racial equality and an end to militarism in the United States. McCrackin was well known to the state's attorneys office as he was arrested over and over again in protests. Rev. McCrackin was also active in the fight for prisoner's rights and spent much time visiting convicts. Once, he was abducted by a man that he had visited in jail and rather than see him incarcerated again, refused to testify against him. The district attorney in Cincinnati jailed McCrackin for weeks because of this incident.

== Quotes ==
To give financial support to war while at the same time preaching against it is, to me, no longer a tenable position.
