= Ernest Bromley =

American civil rights and peace activist (1912–1997)

Ernest Bromley (March 14, 1912 – December 17, 1997) was an American minister, Quaker and civil rights and peace activist. A founding member of the Freedom Riders, he played an active role in protests of racial segregation in the Southern United States. He also organized rallies in Cincinnati which protested the Vietnam War and segregation.

Bromley was also a pioneer of the modern American tax resistance movement. In 1942 he refused to display a "defense tax stamp" on his car. He redirected the $7.09 cost of the stamp that would have gone to the war effort and gave it instead to Methodist overseas relief. He was jailed for 60 days and lost his position as minister.

He married Marion Bromley in 1948. He produced and edited a local newsletter called Peacemaker for many years. Peacemakers was the name of an organization that he and his wife Marion helped found that encouraged pacifism and resistance to war taxes and the draft. Peacemakers developed a fund for families of people imprisoned for acts of conscience. In the 1970s the Internal Revenue Service tried and failed to seize their home for non-payment of taxes. In 1977 the War Resisters League gave the Bromleys its annual Peace Award.

His activism informed and was informed by his faith as a member of the Religious Society of Friends, specifically Cincinnati Community Friends monthly meeting. The Quaker testimonies of peace and equality were values for which he lived.
