= Tax resistance =

Refusal to pay a tax in opposition to government policy or taxation itself

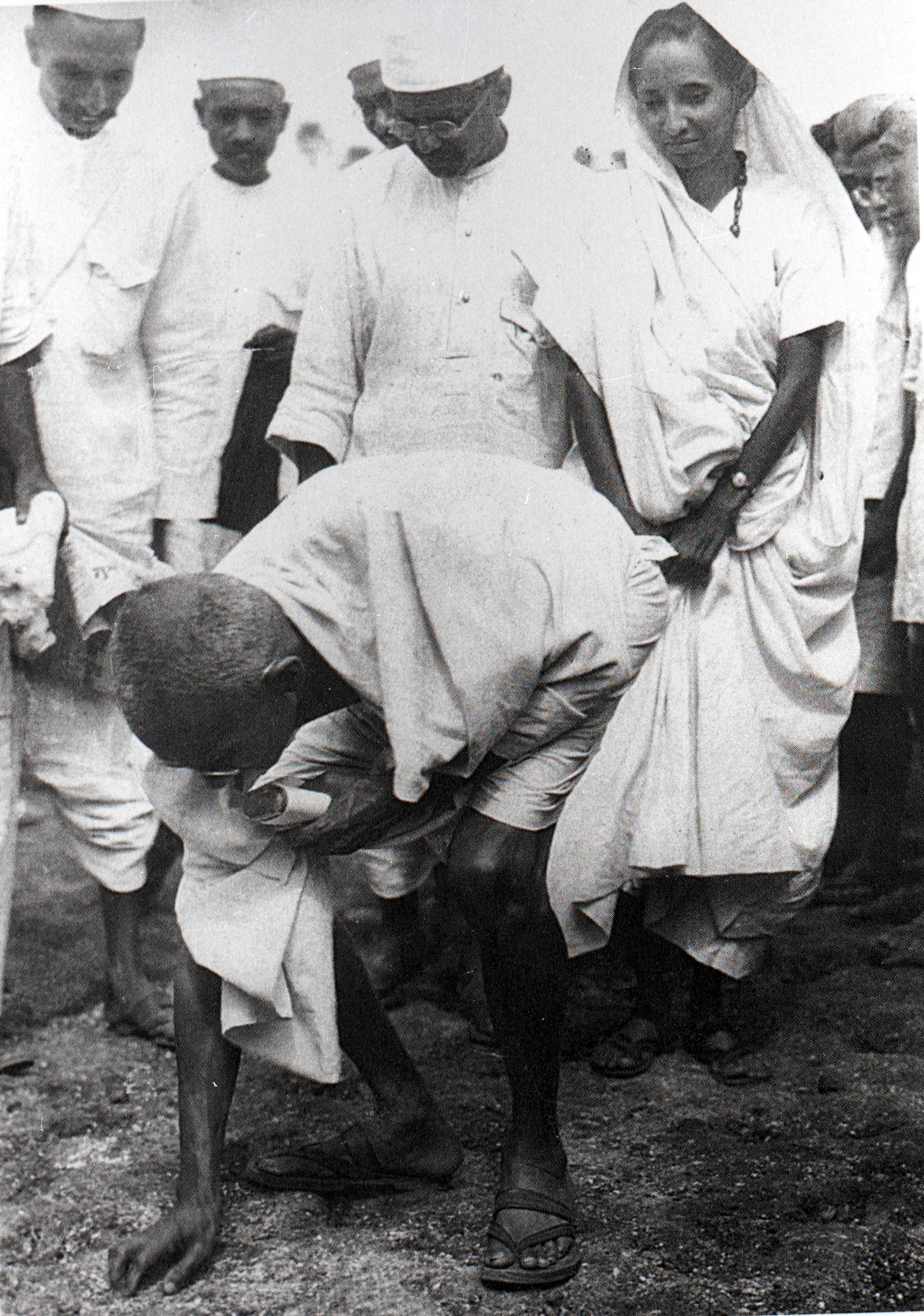
Gandhi picking up salt and disobeying the British salt production and tax laws

Tax resistance (also known as a tax strike or tax revolt) is the refusal to pay tax because of opposition to the government that is imposing the tax, or to government policy, or as opposition to taxation in itself. Tax resistance is a form of direct action and, if in violation of the tax regulations, also a form of civil disobedience. Tax resisters are distinct from "tax protesters", who deny that the legal obligation to pay taxes exists or applies to them. Tax resisters may accept that some law commands them to pay taxes but they still choose to resist taxation.

Examples of tax resistance campaigns include those advocating home rule, such as the Salt March led by Mahatma Gandhi, and those promoting women's suffrage, such as the Women's Tax Resistance League. War tax resistance is the refusal to pay some or all taxes that pay for war and may be practiced by conscientious objectors, pacifists, or those protesting against a particular war.

== History ==
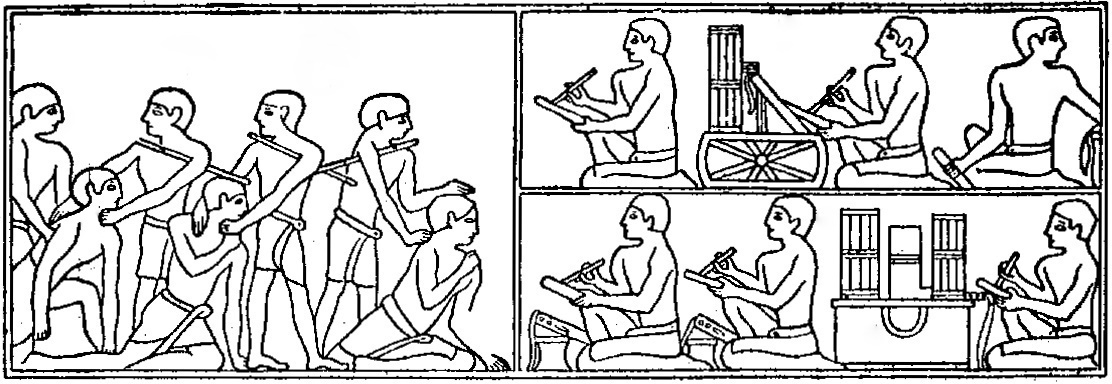
Egyptian peasants seized for non-payment of taxes during the Pyramid Age

The earliest and most widespread forms of taxation were the corvée and tithe, both of which can be traced back to the beginning of civilization. The corvée was state-imposed forced labour on peasants too poor to pay other forms of taxation (labour in ancient Egyptian is a synonym for taxes). Low taxes helped the Roman aristocracy increase their wealth, which equalled or exceeded the revenues of the central government. An emperor sometimes replenished his treasury by confiscating the estates of the "super-rich", but in the later period, the resistance of the wealthy to paying taxes was one of the factors contributing to the collapse of the empire.

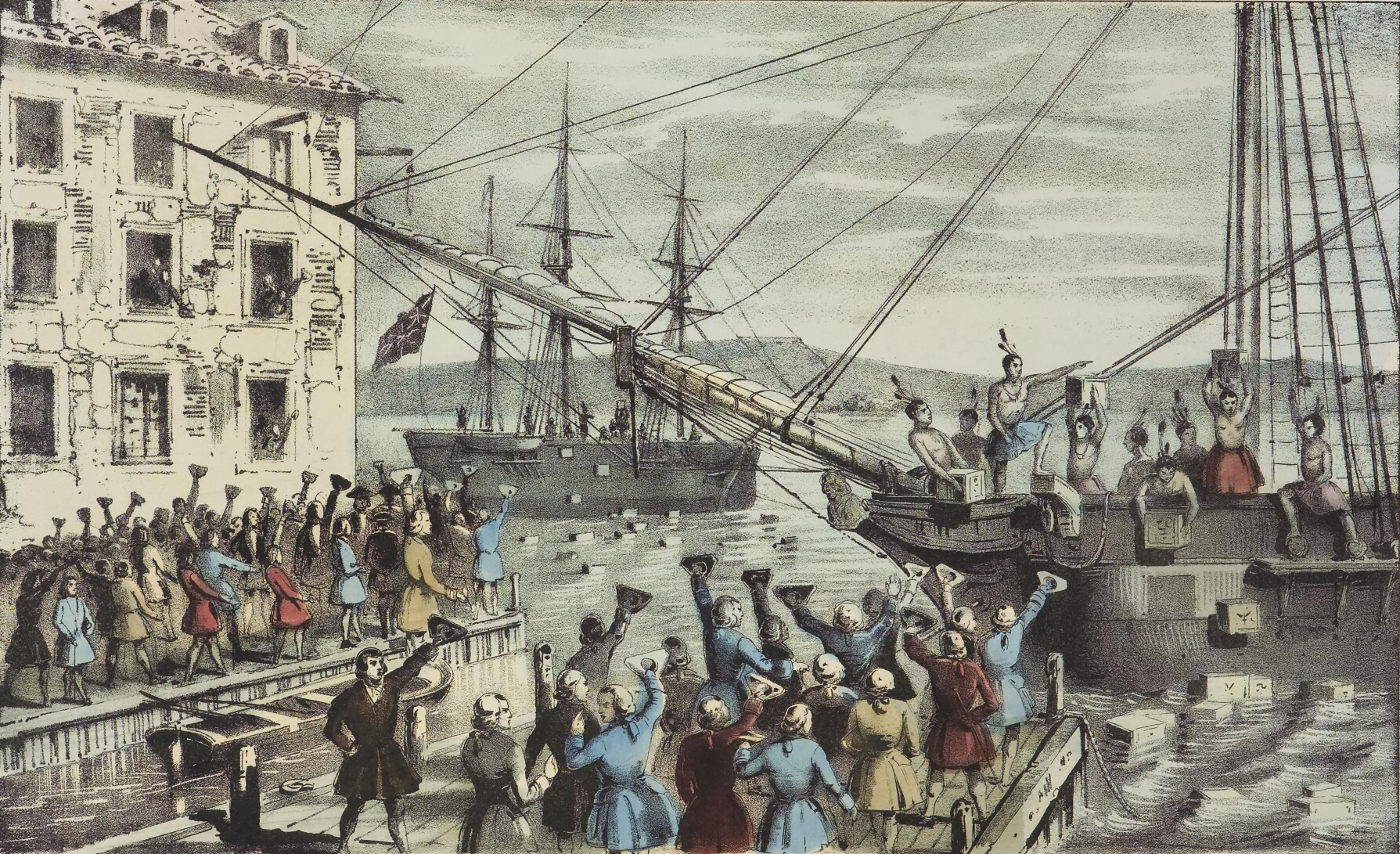
The Boston Tea Party, 16 December 1773

Because taxation is often oppressive, governments have always struggled with tax noncompliance and resistance. It has been suggested that tax resistance played a significant role in the collapse of several empires, including the Egyptian, Roman, Spanish, and Aztec. Reports of collective tax refusal include Zealots resisting the Roman poll tax during the 1st century CE, culminating in the First Jewish–Roman War. Other historic events that originated as tax revolts include Magna Carta, the American Revolution and the French Revolution.

War tax resisters often highlight the relationship between income tax and war. In Britain income tax was introduced in 1799, to pay for weapons and equipment in preparation for the Napoleonic wars, whilst the US federal government imposed their first income tax in the Revenue Act of 1861 to help pay for the American Civil War.

== Views and aims ==
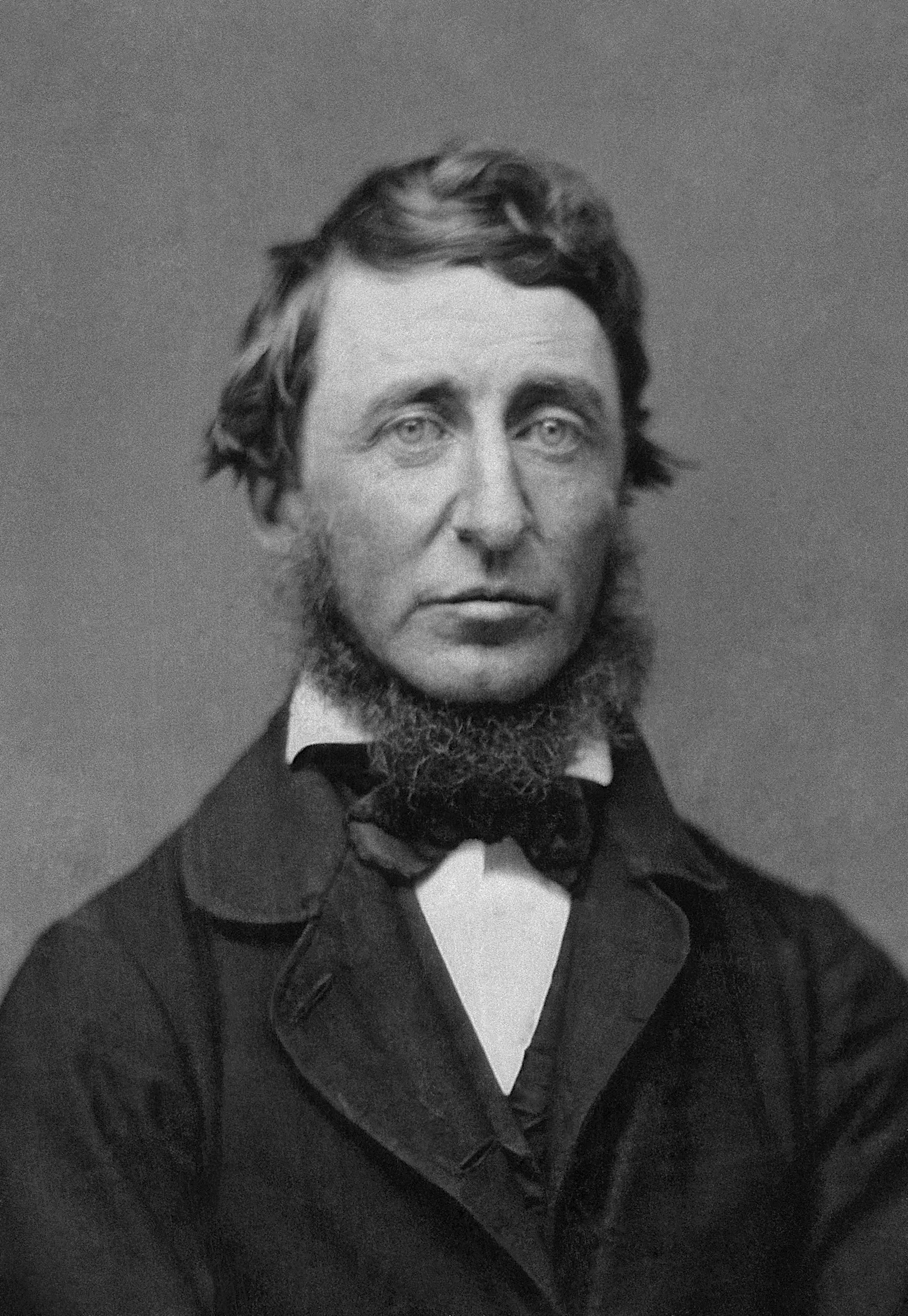
Henry David Thoreau, author of Civil Disobedience

Tax resisters come from a wide range of backgrounds with diverse ideologies and aims. For example, Henry David Thoreau and William Lloyd Garrison drew inspiration from the American Revolution and the stubborn pacifism of the Quakers. Some tax resisters refuse to pay tax because their conscience will not allow them to fund war, whilst others resist tax as part of a campaign to overthrow the government.

Tax resisters have been violent revolutionaries like John Adams and pacifist nonresistants like John Woolman; communists like Karl Marx and capitalists like Vivien Kellems; solitary anti-war activists like Ammon Hennacy and leaders of independence movements like Mahatma Gandhi. Leo Tolstoy, a Christian anarchist, urged government leaders to change their attitude to war and citizens to taxes:

If only each King, Emperor, and President understood that his work of directing armies is not an honourable and important duty, as his flatterers persuade him it is, but a bad and shameful act of preparation for murder—and if each private individual understood that the payment of taxes wherewith to hire and equip soldiers, and, above all, army-service itself, are not matters of indifference, but are bad and shameful actions by which he not only permits but participates in murder—then this power of Emperors, Kings, and Presidents, which now arouses our indignation, and which causes them to be murdered, would disappear of itself.

== Methods ==
As an example of the numerous tax resistance methods, below are some of the legal and illegal techniques used by war tax resisters:

=== Legal ===
==== Avoidance ====
A resister may lower their tax payments by using legal tax avoidance techniques.

==== Paying under protest ====
Some taxpayers pay their taxes, but include protest letters along with their tax forms. Others pay in a protesting form—for instance, by writing their cheque on a toilet seat or a mock-up of a missile. Others pay in a way that creates inconvenience for the collector—for instance, by paying the entire amount in low-denomination coins. This last method is less effective in countries where small coins are legal tender only in limited amounts, allowing the tax authority legally to reject such payments; for example in England and Wales, 1p coins are legal tender only in amounts up to 20p.

==== Reducing taxable income and consumption ====
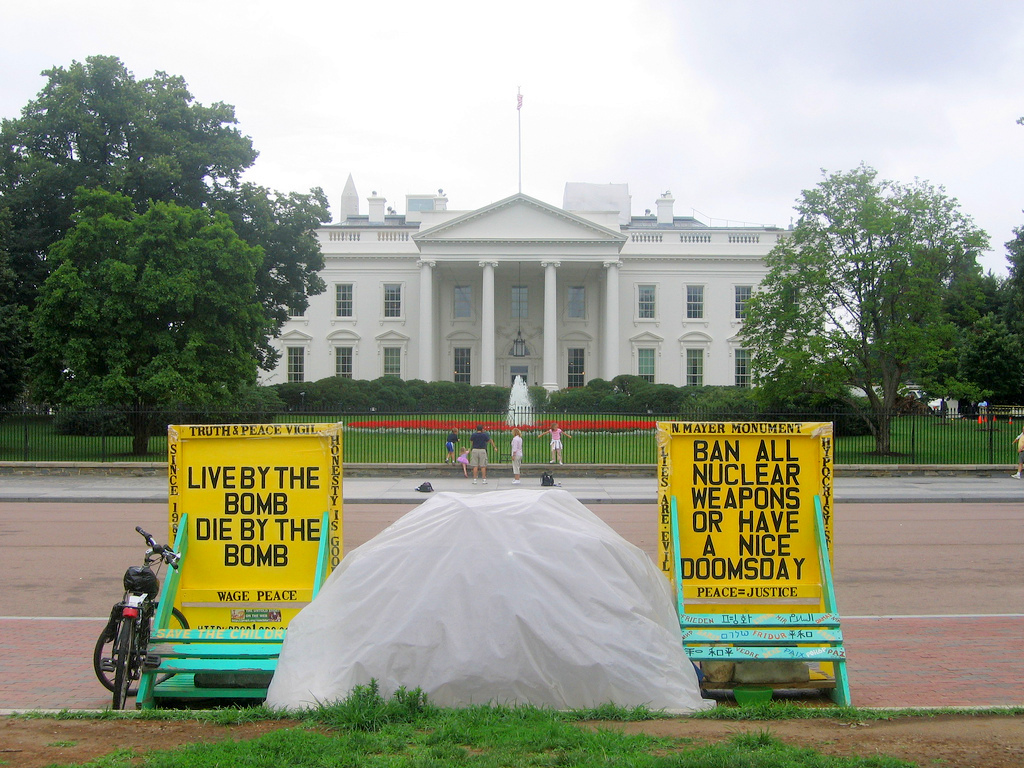
The White House Peace Vigil, started by Thomas in 1981 and supported by tax resister Ellen Thomas

Other tax resisters change their lifestyles so that they owe less tax. For instance; to avoid consumption taxes on alcohol, a resister might home-brew beer; to avoid excise taxes on gasoline, a resister might take up cycling; to avoid income tax, a resister may reduce their income below the tax threshold by embracing simple living or a freegan lifestyle. For example, British citizens pay no income tax if their income is below the personal allowance. In the US the equivalent tax-free annual income is the standard deduction, though many deductions and credits allow people to earn much more than this and still avoid income tax.

Opposition to war has led some, such as Ammon Hennacy and Ellen Thomas, to a form of tax resistance in which they reduce their income below the tax threshold by taking up a simple living lifestyle. These individuals believe that their government is engaged in immoral, unethical or destructive activities such as war, and that paying taxes inevitably funds these activities. These methods differ from tax evasion in that they stay within the tax laws, and they differ from tax avoidance in that the goal is to pay as little tax as possible rather than to keep as much post-tax income as possible.

=== Illegal ===
==== Evasion ====
A resister may decide to reduce their tax paid through illegal tax evasion. For instance, one way to evade income tax is to only work for cash-in-hand, therefore circumventing withholding tax.

==== Redirection ====
Some tax resisters refuse to pay all or a portion of the taxes due but then make an equivalent donation to charity. In this way, they demonstrate that the intent of their resistance is not selfish and that they want to use a portion of their earnings to contribute to the common good. For instance, Julia Butterfly Hill resisted about $150,000 in federal taxes, and donated that money to after-school programs, arts and cultural programs, community gardens, programs for Native Americans, alternatives to incarceration, and environmental protection programs. She said:

I actually take the money that the IRS says goes to them and I give it to the places where our taxes should be going. And in my letter to the IRS I said: "I'm not refusing to pay my taxes. I'm actually paying them but I'm paying them where they belong because you refuse to do so."

==== Refusing specific taxes ====
Some resisters refuse to willingly pay only certain taxes, either because those taxes are especially noxious to them, or because they present a useful symbolic target, or because they are more easily resisted. For instance, in the United States, many tax resisters resist the telephone federal excise tax. The tax was initiated to pay for the Spanish–American War and has frequently been raised or extended by the government during times of war. This made it an attractive symbolic target as a "war tax". Such refusal is relatively safe: because this tax is typically small, resistance very rarely triggers significant government retaliation. Phone companies will cooperate with such resisters by removing the excise tax from their phone bills and reporting their resistance to the government.

==== Refusing to pay ====
The most dramatic and characteristic method of tax resistance is to refuse to pay a tax – either by quietly ignoring the tax bill or by openly declaring the refusal to pay. Some tax resisters resist only a portion of the taxes due. For instance, some war tax resisters refuse to pay a percentage of their taxes equivalent to the military percentage of the government's budget.

== See also ==
- Draft resistance
- Tax choice
- Taxation as theft
- Property tax revolt, a series of tax reform laws in the United States in the late 20th century
