= CAHA =

CAHA or Caha may refer to:

- Canadian Amateur Hockey Association, a former ice hockey governing body in Canada
- Calar Alto Observatory or Centro Astronómico Hispano-Alemán, an astronomy institute in Spain
- Caha Mountains, a mountain range in Ireland
- Robert Caha (born 1976), Czech footballer

== See also ==
- Caha-Paluma
- Caha v. United States, see Tax protester constitutional arguments
