= Tax protester constitutional arguments =

Arguments that U.S. federal income tax violates the U.S. Constitution

Tax protesters in the United States advance a number of constitutional arguments asserting that the imposition, assessment and collection of the federal income tax violates the United States Constitution. These kinds of arguments, though related to, are distinguished from statutory and administrative arguments, which presuppose the constitutionality of the income tax, as well as from general conspiracy arguments, which are based upon the proposition that the three branches of the federal government are involved together in a deliberate, on-going campaign of deception for the purpose of defrauding individuals or entities of their wealth or profits. Although constitutional challenges to U.S. tax laws are frequently directed towards the validity and effect of the Sixteenth Amendment, assertions that the income tax violates various other provisions of the Constitution have been made as well.

== First Amendment ==
Some protesters argue that imposition of income taxes violates the First Amendment freedom of speech because

- it requires the subject of the tax to write information on a tax return.
- violates freedom of religion if the subject of the tax claims some religious objection to the payment of taxes, particularly if the subject styles himself or herself as a Reverend, Minister, or other religious office-holder. While the Internal Revenue Code makes an exemption for churches and other religious institutions, it makes only special tax codes and deductions, not exceptions, for religious professionals. The United States Supreme Court held in 1878 Reynolds v. United States, that a religious belief, however strongly held, does not exempt the believer from adhering to general laws.

== Fifth Amendment ==
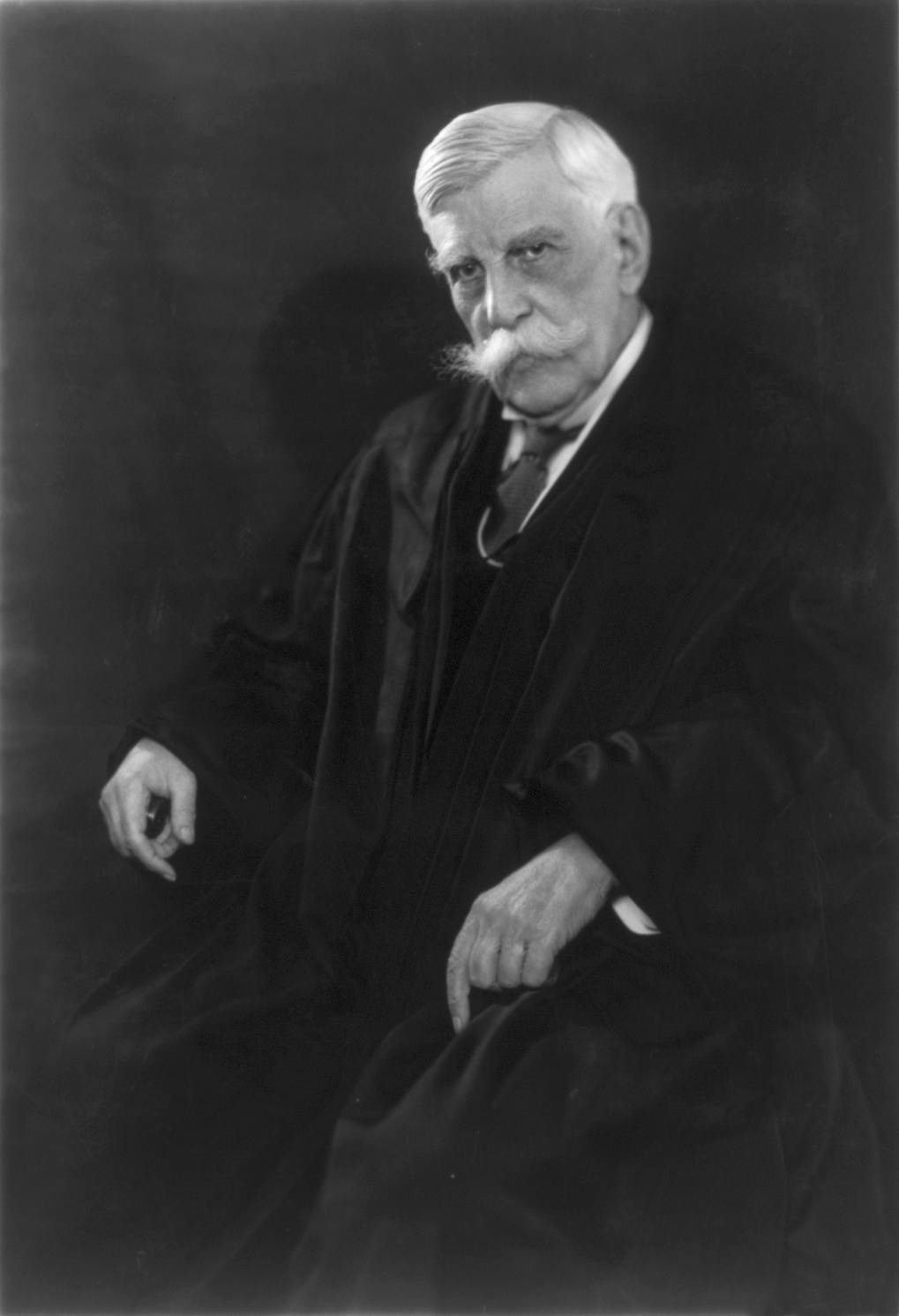
Justice Oliver Wendell Holmes, whose opinion in United States v. Sullivan is often cited by courts in Fifth Amendment self-incrimination cases

=== Self incrimination ===
Other protesters argue that the Fifth Amendment right against self-incrimination allows an individual to refuse to file an income tax return calling for information that could lead to a conviction for criminal acts from which the income was derived, or for the crime of not paying the tax itself. In response, the courts generally refer to the case of United States v. Sullivan, where Justice Oliver Wendell Holmes wrote:

If the form of return provided called for answers that the defendant was privileged from making he could have raised the objection in the return, but could not on that account refuse to make any return at all.... It would be an extreme if not an extravagant application of the Fifth Amendment to say that it authorized a man to refuse to state the amount of his income because it had been made in crime. But if the defendant desired to test that or any other point he should have tested it in the return so that it could be passed upon. He could not draw a conjurer's circle around the whole matter by his own declaration that to write any word upon the government blank would bring him into danger of the law.

In short, a person could refuse to answer a question if that particular answer could incriminate them, e.g., a professional killer could decline to answer the question of what his or her occupation was. All that is necessary to ask is, could the answer to the question, alone, provide a "link in the chain" necessary to provide evidence to a crime. Saying your occupation is "assassin" or "professional killer" could be self-incriminating, and therefore the 5th Amendment could be invoked as to that question; saying you made $635,000 last year does not provide evidence of anything criminal and thus it could not.

=== Takings Clause ===
Some protesters have argued that the income tax is a prohibited "takings" under the Fifth Amendment's Takings Clause, and can not be imposed unless the taxpayer receives just compensation. The United States Supreme Court rejected this argument in Brushaber v. Union Pacific Railroad. The takings argument and variations of this argument have been officially identified as legally frivolous federal tax return positions for purposes of the $5,000 frivolous tax return penalty imposed under Internal Revenue Code section 6702(a).

=== Due Process Clause ===
Protesters argue that the income tax violates the Fifth Amendment right that no person shall be "deprived of life, liberty, or property, without due process of law". However, people can be deprived of life, liberty, or property with due process of law — this is what the courts do. Legal commentator Daniel B. Evans describes:

Every time a court finds a defendant guilty, the court has deprived the defendant of life or liberty, and every time a court rules in favor of a plaintiff or defendant, the court has deprived either the plaintiff or the defendant of some property. So saying that a court has deprived someone of life, liberty, or property is not particularly interesting unless you can explain exactly what the court did (or did not do) that deprived that particular someone of due process. Similarly, the general proposition that every man has the right to his own labor does not necessarily lead to the conclusion that the government cannot tax the "common right" of labor. If the government could never impose a tax that took away someone's rights to their property, then the government could never tax anyone for anything. So the claim that a tax deprives someone of "property" or a "right" is pretty much meaningless.

Fifth Amendment due process arguments by tax protesters were rejected by the United States Court of Appeals for the Third Circuit in Kahn v. United States, by the United States Court of Appeals for the Fifth Circuit in Anderson v. United States, by the United States Court of Appeals for the Seventh Circuit in Cameron v. Internal Revenue Serv., by the United States Court of Appeals for the Eighth Circuit in Baskin v. United States, by the United States Court of Appeals for the Ninth Circuit in Jolly v. United States, and by the United States Court of Appeals for the Tenth Circuit in Martinez v. Internal Revenue Serv.

== Thirteenth Amendment ==
Tax protesters have argued that income taxes impose involuntary servitude in violation of the Thirteenth Amendment. That argument was ruled to be without merit in Porth v. Brodrick, United States Collector of Internal Revenue for the State of Kansas. The involuntary servitude argument, and variations of this argument, have been officially identified as legally frivolous federal tax return positions for purposes of the $5,000 frivolous tax return penalty imposed under Internal Revenue Code section 6702(a).

== Fourteenth Amendment ==
Some tax protesters, notably among the sovereign citizen movement, argue that all Americans are citizens of individual states as opposed to citizens of the United States, and that the United States government therefore has no power to tax citizens or impose other federal laws outside of Washington D.C. and other federal enclaves. They cite the first sentence of Section 1 of the Fourteenth Amendment which states, "All persons born or naturalized in the United States, and subject to the jurisdiction thereof, are citizens of the United States and of the State wherein they reside."

Courts have uniformly held that this argument that the Fourteenth Amendment deprived state citizens of U.S. citizenship is plainly incorrect. In Kantor v. Wellesley Galleries, Ltd., the court explained that "[w]hile the Fourteenth Amendment does not create a national citizenship, it has the effect of making that citizenship 'paramount and dominant' instead of 'derivative and dependent' upon state citizenship". See also United States v. Ward, Fox v. Commissioner, and United States v. Baker.

Another argument raised is that because the federal income tax is progressive, the discriminations and inequalities created by the tax should render the tax unconstitutional under the 14th Amendment, which guarantees equal protection under the law. Such arguments have been ruled without merit under contemporary jurisprudence. Notably, some tax protesters contend that the Fourteenth Amendment itself was never properly ratified, under the theory that the governments of southern states that supported the post-Civil War constitutional amendments were not representative of the people.

== Sixteenth Amendment ==
It has been argued that the imposition of the U.S. federal income tax is illegal because the Sixteenth Amendment, which grants Congress the "power to lay and collect taxes on incomes, from whatever source derived, without apportionment among the several States, and without regard to any census or enumeration," was not properly ratified, or that the amendment provides no power to tax income from labor. Proper ratification of the Sixteenth Amendment is disputed by tax protesters who argue that the quoted text of the Amendment differed from the text proposed by Congress, or that Ohio was not a State during ratification. Sixteenth Amendment ratification arguments have been rejected in every court case where they have been raised and have been identified as legally frivolous.

Some protesters have argued that because the Sixteenth Amendment does not contain the words "repeal" or "repealed", the Amendment is ineffective to change the law. Others argue that due to language in Stanton v. Baltic Mining Co., the income tax is an unconstitutional direct tax that should be apportioned (divided equally amongst the population of the various states). Several tax protesters assert that the Congress has no constitutional power to tax labor or income from labor, citing a variety of court cases. These arguments include claims that the word "income" as used in the Sixteenth Amendment cannot be interpreted as applying to wages; that wages are not income because labor is exchanged for them; that taxing wages violates individuals' right to property, and several others.

== Seventeenth Amendment ==
An argument raised in the case of Trohimovich v. Commissioner is that the Seventeenth Amendment to the United States Constitution was not properly ratified, and that all laws passed by Congress since the year 1919 (which was not the year of ratification) are invalid. The Trohimovich case involved a criminal contempt charge against the taxpayer in connection with a failure to obey a subpoena to produce books and records needed for the trial of the case. The United States Tax Court stated:

The [taxpayer's] petition in this case, while rambling and lengthy, appears to rely primarily on arguments that neither the Internal Revenue Service nor this Court has authority to determine petitioner's tax liability because the Seventeenth Amendment to the Constitution, which changed the method of electing senators to the U.S. Congress, was improperly proposed and/or adopted, and therefore all laws enacted by Congress (and the Senate) subsequent to at least 1919 are invalid. This included the Internal Revenue Code and the legislation which established this Court.

The court rejected the taxpayer's arguments, and ordered that "he be imprisoned for 30 days as punishment" for criminal contempt in failing to obey court orders or subpoenas.

== Titles of Nobility Amendment ==
Another tax protester argument centers upon the pending and inoperative Titles of Nobility Amendment. Proposed as an amendment to the Constitution by the 11th Congress in 1810, it would, if ratified by the required number of states, strip United States citizenship from any citizen who accepted a title of nobility from a foreign government. The contention here is that this amendment was in fact ratified by the required number of states (in the 1810s) to have become an operative part of the Constitution, and that, because this is so, actions taken by lawyers and judges, who use the title Esquire–asserted to be a title of nobility and monarchical–are unconstitutional. In fact, the use of "Esquire" by lawyers and judges is merely an informal custom in the United States, not a title with any legal standing. This contention, rarely raised before courts, was most recently addressed in Campion v. Towns, No.CV-04-1516PHX-ROS, *2 n.1 (D. Ariz. 2005) as a defense to a charge of tax evasion. The court replied:

Additionally, the Court will correct any misunderstanding Plaintiff has concerning the text of the Thirteenth Amendment to the United States Constitution. In his Complaint, Plaintiff includes a certified copy of the Thirteenth Amendment from the Colorado State Archives which was published in 1861. As included in that compilation, the Thirteenth Amendment would strip an individual of United States citizenship if they accept any title of nobility or honor. However, this is not the Thirteenth Amendment. The correct Thirteenth Amendment prohibits slavery. Although some people claim that state publication of the erroneous Thirteenth Amendment makes it valid, Article V of the Constitution does not so provide.

== Federal government authority ==
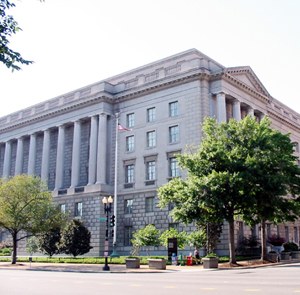
Internal Revenue Service building on Constitution Avenue in Washington, D.C. The agency collects taxes and enforces the internal revenue laws.

Neither the U.S. Supreme Court nor any other federal court has ruled that an income tax imposed under the Internal Revenue Code of 1986 is unconstitutional. Under the Supreme Court ruling in Cheek v. United States, a defendant in a tax evasion prosecution who has made arguments that the federal income tax laws are unconstitutional may have the arguments turned against him (or her). Such arguments, even if based on honestly held beliefs, may constitute evidence that helps the prosecutor prove willfulness, one of the elements of tax evasion.

=== Sovereign individual and government privilege ===
Some tax protesters argue that they should be immune from federal income taxation because they are sovereign individuals or "natural individuals," or on the ground that they have not requested a privilege or benefit from the government. These kinds of arguments have been ruled without merit. For example, in the case of Lovell v. United States the United States Court of Appeals for the Seventh Circuit stated:

Plaintiffs argue first that they are exempt from federal taxation because they are "natural individuals" who have not "requested, obtained or exercised any, privilege from an agency of government." This is not a basis for an exemption from federal income tax. [citation omitted] All individuals, natural or unnatural, must pay federal income tax on their wages, regardless of whether they received any "privileges" from the government. Plaintiffs also contend that the Constitution prohibits imposition of a direct tax without apportionment. They are wrong; it does not. U. S. Const. amend. XVI...

The Court of Appeals in Lovell affirmed a U.S. District Court order upholding a frivolous return penalty under 26 U.S.C. § 6702(a). Similarly, in United States v. Sloan, the taxpayer's contention — that he is "not a citizen of the United States, but rather, that he is a freeborn, natural individual, a citizen of the State of Indiana, and a 'master'—not 'servant'—of his government" — was ruled to be not a legal ground for the argument that the taxpayer was not subject to the federal tax laws; the tax evasion conviction was upheld by the United States Court of Appeals for the Seventh Circuit. Similarly, the United States Court of Appeals for the Third Circuit stated, in Powers v. Commissioner: "Powers [the taxpayer] contends that either he is immune from the tax laws, or he is a 'slave' to the federal government. This false choice is a creature of Powers' tax protester ideology, not the laws of this Republic." Similarly, in 2008 the United States Court of Appeals for the Tenth Circuit rejected a taxpayer's argument that gains of an individual's labor could be taxed only if the gains were received from a "federal venue". In that case, the taxpayer's argument—that the IRS had no ability to impose a tax on the taxpayer because he was a citizen "of the several states," but not a "federal U.S. citizen"—was ruled to be frivolous.

Variations of the argument that an individual is a "sovereign" have been rejected in tax cases such as United States v. Hart, Risner v. Commissioner, Maxwell v. Snow, Rowe v. Internal Revenue Serv., Cobin v. Commissioner, and Glavin v. United States.

The argument that an individual who received Form W-2 wages or other compensation is not subject to federal income tax because the individual has "neither requested, obtained, nor exercised any privilege from an agency of government" was ruled frivolous by the United States Court of Appeals for the First Circuit in Sullivan v. United States and again in Kelly v. United States. See also United States v. Buras (argument that the taxpayer can be subject to an excise tax only if he benefits from a "privilege extended by a government agency" was rejected).; Nichols v. United States; and Olson v. United States.

The argument that an individual who received Form W-2 wages is not subject to federal income tax unless the tax is imposed in connection with "government granted privileges" was ruled frivolous by the United States Court of Appeals for the Seventh Circuit in Coleman v. Commissioner. The argument that an individual who received Form W-2 wages is not subject to federal income tax unless the taxpayer enjoys a "grant of privilege or franchise" was ruled frivolous by the United States Court of Appeals for the Eighth Circuit in May v. Commissioner. The argument that an individual who received Form W-2 wages is not subject to federal income tax unless the taxpayer has obtained a "privilege from a governmental agency" was ruled frivolous by the United States Court of Appeals for the Ninth Circuit in Olson v. United States, and by the United States Court of Appeals for the Tenth Circuit in Prout v. United States.

In the case of Steward Machine Company v. Davis, the Supreme Court rejected the argument that "the relation of employment is one so essential to the pursuit of happiness that it may not be burdened with a tax," and upheld the validity of the Social Security tax. The Court stated: ". . . natural rights, so called, are as much subject to taxation as rights of less importance. An excise is not limited to vocations or activities that may be prohibited altogether. It is not limited to those that are the outcome of a franchise. It extends to vocations or activities pursued as of common right.".

Regarding the taxability of income in connection with events or activities not involving a government privilege or franchise, the United States Supreme Court stated in United States v. Sullivan that gains from illegal traffic in liquor are subject to the Federal income tax. The U.S. Supreme Court ruled in Rutkin v. United States that the receipt of money obtained by extortion is taxable as income to the wrongdoer. The U.S. Supreme Court ruled in James v. United States that the receipt of money obtained through embezzlement is taxable as income to the wrongdoer, even though the wrongdoer is required to return the money to its owner.

The argument that a person's income is not taxed when the person rejects or renounces United States citizenship because the person claims to be a citizen exclusively of a state, and variations of this argument, have been officially identified as legally frivolous federal tax return positions for purposes of the $5,000 frivolous tax return penalty imposed under Internal Revenue Code section 6702(a).

=== Federal zone ===
Some tax protesters argue that under Article I, section 8, clause 17 of the Constitution, federal income taxes can be imposed only inside so called "federal zones", areas —such as the District of Columbia, military bases or other places– over which Congress has direct authority.

This argument is based in part on the U.S. Supreme Court decision in the case of United States v. Bevans. In Bevans, the parties argued over whether a federal court in Massachusetts had jurisdiction over the case of a U.S. Marine charged with a murder that occurred on a ship in Boston Harbor. No issues regarding federal income taxation or the Internal Revenue Code were presented to or decided by the Court in the Bevans case. The Internal Revenue Code and the Internal Revenue Service did not yet exist in 1818, when the Bevans murder case was decided.

The Clause 17 argument was specifically rejected in the case of United States v. Sato:

Defendants argue that Clause 17 limits the legislative power of Congress such that the only geographical areas over which Congress may legislate, or may exercise its power of taxation, are those areas described in Clause 17. This position is contrary to both the natural reading of the Constitution and the case law. Clause 17 limits not the power of Congress, but the power of the states. "[T]he word 'exclusive' was employed to eliminate any possibility that the legislative power of Congress over the District [of Columbia] was to be concurrent with that of the ceding states." . . . Similarly, it is clear that the power of the Congress to collect taxes, created by Article I, Section 8, Clause 1 of the Constitution, is an independent power which is not limited by the other specific powers enumerated in Section 8. United States v. Butler, 297 U.S. 1, 65-66, 56 S. Ct. 312, 319 (1936). It is thus readily apparent that Congress' power to tax extends beyond the exclusive legislative districts contemplated by Clause 17. Defendants' motion to dismiss based on Clause 17 is denied.

The Clause 17 argument was also unsuccessful in Celauro v. United States, Internal Revenue Service. Some tax protesters contend that the U.S. Supreme Court decision in Caha v. United States restricts the jurisdiction of the federal government to impose income taxes inside the "states", based on the following language from the Court's opinion:

This statute is one of universal application within the territorial limits of the United States, and is not limited to those portions which are within the exclusive jurisdiction of the national government, such as the District of Columbia. Generally speaking, within any state of this Union the preservation of the peace and the protection of person and property are the functions of the state government, and are no part of the primary duty, at least, of the nation. The laws of congress in respect to those matters do not extend into the territorial limits of the states, but have force only in the District of Columbia, and other places that are within the exclusive jurisdiction of the national gover[n]ment.

Some tax protesters contend that the Court's reference to "those matters" restricted the federal government's jurisdiction over matters of taxation. Caha is not a tax case. The reference to "this statute" was a reference to a perjury statute. The Caha case involved a perjury conviction where the defendant unsuccessfully argued that the federal court had no jurisdiction over a prosecution for the crime of perjury committed in a proceeding in a land office at Kingfisher, Oklahoma regarding ownership of real estate.

The reference in Caha to the "laws of congress in respect to those matters" was a reference to the matters of preservation of the peace and the protection of person and property. The Court in Caha rejected the argument that the federal courts had no jurisdiction to hear a case under the perjury statute, and the defendant's conviction was affirmed. No issues involving the power to impose and enforce federal taxes in the fifty states were presented to or decided by the court in Caha.

The courts have uniformly rejected the "federal zone" argument that congressional authority to impose an income tax is limited to the District of Columbia, forts, magazines, arsenals, or dockyards, etc. See, for example, United States v. Mundt; Nelsen v. Commissioner; Abbs v. Imhoff.

== Definition of income ==
=== Stratton's Independence, Limited v. Howbert ===
Some tax protesters have cited the U.S. Supreme Court case of Stratton's Independence, Ltd. v. Howbert for the argument that an income tax on an individual's income is unconstitutional. This was an argument raised unsuccessfully by John B. Hill Jr., in Hill v. United States. and without success by John B. Cameron Jr., in Cameron v. Internal Revenue Serv.. In Stratton, a mining corporation argued that the 1909 corporation tax act did not apply to that corporation. The U.S. Supreme Court ruled that the 1909 corporation tax act did apply to mining corporations, and that the proceeds of ores mined by the corporation from its own premises were income within the meaning of the 1909 tax act. The Court also ruled that the corporation was not entitled to deduct "the value of such ore in place and before it is mined" as depreciation within the meaning of the 1909 Act. The Stratton case involved income taxation of a corporation, not of individuals. The Court in the Stratton case did not rule any corporate or individual income tax as unconstitutional.

=== Doyle v. Mitchell Bros. Co. ===
Some tax protesters have cited Doyle v. Mitchell Bros. Co. for the proposition that income of individuals cannot be taxed. This was the argument raised unsuccessfully by Joseph T. Tornichio in the case of Tornichio v. United States and by Joram Perl in Perl v. United States (also unsuccessfully). The following language is sometimes cited by protesters:

Yet it is plain, we think, that by the true intent and meaning of the act the entire proceeds of a mere conversion of capital assets were not to be treated as income. Whatever difficulty there may be about a precise and scientific definition of 'income,' it imports, as used here, something entirely distinct from principal or capital either as a subject of taxation or as a measure of the tax; conveying rather the idea of gain or increase arising from corporate activities.

The above verbiage is immediately followed in the text of the case by this sentence:

As was said in Stratton's Independence v. Howbert, 231 U.S. 399, 415, 34 S. Sup. Ct. 136: 'Income may be defined as the gain derived from capital, from labor, or from both combined.'

In Doyle, the taxpayer was a corporation engaged in the manufacture of lumber. In 1903, the taxpayer purchased certain timber land at a cost of about $20 per acre ($49/ha). As of December 31, 1908, the value of the land had increased to about $40 per acre ($99/ha). The Corporation Excise Tax Act of 1909 was enacted on August 5, 1909, and was effective retroactively to January 1, 1909. For the years 1909 through 1912, the taxpayer filed tax returns under the 1909 Act, showing gross receipts from the sale of manufactured lumber and, in arriving at the amount of net income subject to tax under the 1909 Act, deducted an amount based on the $40-per-acre value, rather than the actual cost of about $20 per acre. The Commissioner of Internal Revenue argued that the taxpayer should be able to deduct only an amount based on the taxpayer's historical cost basis of $20, rather than the $40 fair market value at the time the 1909 Act became effective. (Essentially, if the taxpayer were allowed to use the $40 per acre value as its basis rather than the actual $20 historical cost basis, a portion of the taxpayer's gain — the increase in value from 1903 to December 31, 1908 — would go untaxed.)

The U.S. Supreme Court ruled that under the 1909 Act — which had become effective January 1, 1909 — the taxpayer should be taxed only on the increase in value after 1908. Increases in value prior to the effective date of the statute were not to be taxed under the terms of that statute. Thus, the taxpayer was entitled to deduct, from its gross receipts from the sale of finished lumber, a basis amount computed with reference to the $40 per acre value as of December 31, 1908. Doyle is a case involving statutory (not constitutional) interpretation. In this case, the Court was interpreting the 1909 statute. Although some tax protesters cite this case for an argument about the constitutional definition of income as excluding income of individuals, no issues involving the constitutional definition of income, or of income under any other tax statutes, were presented to or decided by the Court.

The case is also notable for the fact that it involved a retroactively imposed tax. The taxpayer did not argue — and the Court did not rule — that as a general proposition taxes could not be imposed retroactively. Indeed, the tax in this case was imposed retroactively; the statute was enacted in August 1909 but was made effective retroactively to January 1, 1909.

=== Corporate profits ===
One argument repeatedly made by tax protesters is that the income of individuals is not taxable because income should mean only "corporate profits" or "corporate gain". This is the Merchants' Loan argument, named after the case of Merchants' Loan & Trust Company, as Trustee of the Estate of Arthur Ryerson, Deceased, Plaintiff in Error v. Julius F. Smietanka, formerly United States Collector of Internal Revenue for the First District of the State of Illinois. The argument is essentially that "income" for federal income tax purposes means only the income of a corporation — not the income of a non-corporate taxpayer — because the United States Supreme Court in that case, in discussing the meaning of income, mentioned a statute enacted in 1909 that taxed the income of corporations.

The Court in Merchants' Loan was specifically interpreting a 1916 statute imposing income taxes on individuals and estates (among other kinds of entities), and not the 1909 corporate tax statute. The taxpayer in Merchants' Loan was not a corporation but was the "Estate of Arthur Ryerson, Deceased". The Court was not presented with (and did not decide) any issue involving the taxability of "corporate profits" or "corporate gains" or any other kind of income except the gain on the sale of the stock by the "Estate of Arthur Ryerson, Deceased". The terms "corporate profit" and "corporate gain" are not found in the text of the Court's decision in Merchants' Loan. In Merchants' Loan, the Supreme Court ruled that under the Sixteenth Amendment to the United States Constitution and the 1916 tax statute applicable at the time, a gain on a sale of stock by the estate of a deceased person is included in the income of that estate, and is therefore taxable to that estate for federal income tax purposes.

The Merchants' Loan argument has been litigated by tax protesters several times, and the courts have uniformly rejected the argument that income consists only of corporate profits. See, for example: Cameron v. Internal Revenue Serv., Stoewer v. Commissioner, Reinhart v. United States, Fink v. Commissioner; Flathers v. Commissioner; Schroeder v. Commissioner; Sherwood v. Commissioner; Ho v. Commissioner; and Zook v. Commissioner. Tax protesters — who have lost every case using Merchants' Loan for the theory that only "corporate profits" could be taxable — are citing a case where the U.S. Supreme Court ruled that the income of a non-corporate taxpayer is taxable. Neither the United States Supreme Court nor any other federal court has ever ruled that under the Internal Revenue Code the term "income" means only the income of a corporation for federal income tax purposes.

Some tax protesters have cited the Supreme Court case of Flint v. Stone Tracy Co. for the argument that only corporate profits or income can be taxed, using the following quotation:

Excises are taxes laid upon the manufacture, sale or consumption of commodities within the country, upon licenses to pursue certain occupations and upon corporate privileges...the requirement to pay such taxes involves the exercise of privileges, and the element of absolute and unavoidable demand is lacking...Conceding the power of Congress to tax the business activities of private corporations.. the tax must be measured by some standard...It is therefore well settled by the decisions of this court that when the sovereign authority has exercised the right to tax a legitimate subject of taxation as an exercise of a franchise or privilege, it is no objection that the measure of taxation is found in the income produced in part from property which of itself considered is nontaxable.

In Flint v. Stone Tracy Co., the U.S. Supreme Court ruled that the corporation tax act of 1909 did not violate the constitutional requirement that revenue measures originate in the U.S. House of Representatives. The Court did not rule that excise taxes consisted only of taxes on corporations and corporate privileges, to the exclusion of taxes on individuals (natural persons). The issue of the validity of an income tax imposed on individuals was neither presented to the Court nor decided by the Court.

The courts have rejected the argument that Flint v. Stone Tracy Co. can be used to avoid taxation of wages. For example, in Parker v. Commissioner, a case where a taxpayer unsuccessfully argued that wages were not taxable, the United States Court of Appeals for the Fifth Circuit stated (in part):

Appellant cites Flint v. Stone Tracy Co., 220 U. S. 107, 31 S. Ct. 342, 55 L. Ed. 389 (1911), in support of his contention that the income tax is an excise tax applicable only against special privileges, such as the privilege of conducting a business, and is not assessable against income in general. Appellant twice errs. Flint did not address personal income tax; it was concerned with corporate taxation. Furthermore, Flint is pre-sixteenth amendment and must be read in that light. At this late date, it seems incredible that we would again be required to hold that the Constitution, as amended, empowers the Congress to levy an income tax against any source of income, without the need to apportion the tax equally among the states, or to classify it as an excise tax applicable to specific categories of activities.

The argument that only corporations are subject to federal income tax, and variations of this argument, have been officially identified as legally frivolous federal tax return positions for purposes of the $5,000 frivolous tax return penalty imposed under Internal Revenue Code section 6702(a).

=== Cases indicating definition of income is irrelevant ===
At least two federal courts have indicated that Congress may constitutionally tax an item as "income," regardless of whether that item is "income" within the meaning of the Sixteenth Amendment. In Penn Mutual Indemnity Co. v. Commissioner, the United States Court of Appeals for the Third Circuit stated:

It did not take a constitutional amendment to entitle the United States to impose an income tax. Pollock v. Farmers' Loan & Trust Co., 157 U. S. 429, 158 U. S. 601 (1895), only held that a tax on the income derived from real or personal property was so close to a tax on that property that it could not be imposed without apportionment. The Sixteenth Amendment removed that barrier. Indeed, the requirement for apportionment is pretty strictly limited to taxes on real and personal property and capitation taxes.

It is not necessary to uphold the validity of the tax imposed by the United States that the tax itself bear an accurate label...

It could well be argued that the tax involved here [an income tax] is an "excise tax" based upon the receipt of money by the taxpayer. It certainly is not a tax on property and it certainly is not a capitation tax; therefore, it need not be apportioned. ... Congress has the power to impose taxes generally, and if the particular imposition does not run afoul of any constitutional restrictions then the tax is lawful, call it what you will.

In Murphy v. Internal Revenue Serv., the United States Court of Appeals for the District of Columbia Circuit ruled that a personal injury award received by a taxpayer was "within the reach of the congressional power to tax under Article I, Section 8 of the Constitution" — even if the award was "not income within the meaning of the Sixteenth Amendment".

== Progressive taxation ==
One argument that has been raised is that because the federal income tax is progressive (i.e., because the marginal tax rates increase, or progress, as the level of taxable income increases), the discriminations and inequalities created by the tax should render the tax unconstitutional. This argument was rejected by the United States Supreme Court in two companion cases — with respect to the income tax on individuals in Thorne v. Anderson, and with respect to the income tax on corporations in Tyee Realty Co. v. Anderson.

== Taxing labor or income from labor ==
Several tax protesters assert that the Congress has no constitutional power to tax labor or income from labor, citing a variety of court cases. These arguments include claims that the word "income" as used in the Sixteenth Amendment cannot be interpreted as applying to wages; that wages are not income because labor is exchanged for them; that taxing wages violates individuals' right to property; that an income tax on wages is illegal as a direct tax on the source of income, and several others.

Another protester argument is that the U.S. Constitution authorizes the income tax only on income derived from activities that are government-licensed or otherwise specially protected. The courts have rejected this theory, ruling that "Congress has taxed compensation for services, without any regard for whether that compensation is derived from government-licensed or specially protected activities, ... and this has been construed to cover earnings from labor."

Robert L. Schulz and his We the People Foundation take the positions that the government "is clearly prohibited from doing what it is doing – taxing the salaries, wages and compensation of the working men and women of this country and forcing the business entities that utilize the labor of ordinary American citizens to withhold and turn over to the IRS a part of the earnings of those workers" and "that the federal government DOES NOT possess ANY legal authority –statutory or Constitutional– to tax the wages or salaries of American workers."

Similarly, tax protester Tom Cryer, who was acquitted of willful failure to file U.S. Federal income tax returns in a timely fashion, argued that "the law does not tax [a person's] wages", and that the federal government cannot tax "[m]oney that you earned [and] paid for with your labor and industry" because "the Constitution does not allow the federal government to tax those earnings" (referring to "wages, salaries and fees that [a person] earn[s] for [himself]").

Arguments about the taxability of compensation for personal services, whether called wages, salary, or some other term, may be either constitutional arguments as in United States v. Connor (see below) or statutory arguments as in Cheek v. United States, depending on the details of the argument. For purposes of presentation, these arguments are summarized here rather than in the article Tax protester statutory arguments. The rest of this section explains these arguments in more detail.

=== Southern Pacific Co. v. Lowe ===
Another United States Supreme Court case frequently cited by tax protesters is Southern Pacific Co. v. Lowe,. Tax protesters attribute the following quotation to the Court in this case: "income; as used in the statute should be given a meaning so as not to include everything that comes in." The quotation does not appear in the text of the Supreme Court decision.

This case began in the United States District Court for the Southern District of New York. In the decision in that court, the trial court judge stated: "I do not think that 'income' as used in the statute, should be given a meaning so as to include everything that comes in." The case did not involve compensation for labor or services. Instead, the case involved the federal income tax treatment of dividends paid by the Central Pacific Railway Company to its parent company, the Southern Pacific Company, which owned 100% of the stock of Central Pacific Railway Company. The District Court ruled that the dividends were taxable to the Southern Pacific Company. This decision was reversed by the Supreme Court.

What the U.S. Supreme Court actually said was:

We must reject in this case, as we have rejected in cases arising under the Corporation Excise Tax Act of 1909 (Doyle, Collector, v. Mitchell Brothers Co., and Hays, Collector, v. Gauley Mountain Coal Co., decided May 20, 1918), the broad contention submitted in behalf of the Government that all receipts--everything that comes in--are income within the proper definition of the term "gross income," and that the entire proceeds of a conversion of capital assets, in whatever form and under whatever circumstances accomplished, should be treated as gross income. Certainly the term "income" has no broader meaning in the 1913 Act than in that of 1909 (see Stratton's Independence v. Howbert, 231 U. S. 399, 416, 417), and for the present purpose we assume there is no difference in its meaning as used in the two Acts.

In Southern Pacific Company v. Lowe, the Supreme Court ruled that where a shareholder receives a dividend representing earnings of a corporation realized by the corporation prior to January 1, 1913, the dividend is not includible in the gross income of the shareholder for purposes of the Federal Income Tax Act of 1913, Ch. 16, 38 Stat. 114 (Oct. 3, 1913). No issues involving the definition of income with respect to wages, salary or other compensation for labor were decided by the Court.

=== Colonial Pipeline Co. v. Traigle ===
Another case that has been cited for the argument that wages are not taxable is the United States Supreme Court decision in Colonial Pipeline Co. v. Traigle. An individual named "William Dixon" at a web site called "godissovereignfast" claims that the following is a statement by the U.S. Supreme Court in that case:

Income taxes statutes apply only to state created creatures known as corporations no matter whether state, local, or federal.", Colonial Pipeline Co. v. Traigle, 421 US 100."

This material alleged to be a quotation does not appear in the text of the case at all. Also, the words "wages" and "salaries" are not found anywhere in the text, and there is no ruling in that case that the federal income tax statutes apply only to "corporations." The Colonial Pipeline case actually involved the Louisiana corporate franchise tax, not a federal tax. The validity of the Louisiana franchise tax was upheld by the U.S. Supreme Court in this case. No issues involving the validity or applicability of federal income taxes were presented to, mentioned by, or decided by the Supreme Court in the Colonial Pipeline case.

=== Lucas v. Earl ===
For the argument that wages are not taxable, some tax protesters—including convicted tax offender Irwin Schiff—incorrectly attribute to the U.S. Supreme Court the following language in connection with the leading tax case of Lucas v. Earl:

The claim that salaries, wages, and compensation for personal services are to be taxed as an entirety and therefore must be returned [i.e., reported on an income tax return] by the individual who has performed the services which produce the gain is without support, either in the language of the Act or in the decisions of the courts construing it. Not only this, but it is directly opposed to provisions of the Act and to regulations of the U.S. Treasury Department, which either prescribed or permits that compensations for personal services not be taxed as an entirety and not be returned by the individual performing the services. It is to be noted that, by the language of the Act, it is not salaries, wages, or compensation for personal services that are to be included in gains, profits, and income derived from salaries, wages, or compensation for personal services.

This language is not from the Court's opinion in Lucas v. Earl. Instead, it is an almost direct quotation from page 17 of the taxpayer's brief filed in the case. Guy C. Earl was the taxpayer, and the brief was written by Earl's attorneys: Warren Olney Jr., J. M. Mannon Jr., and Henry D. Costigan. In some printed versions of the case, this statement and other quotations and paraphrases from pages 8, 10, 14, 15, 17, and 18 of the taxpayer's brief are re-printed as a headnote or syllabus above the opinion of the Court. In the case reprints that include this headnote (and many of them do not even show it), these excerpts are not clearly identified as being from the taxpayer's brief. A person not trained in analysis of legal materials would not necessarily know that this verbiage, like any headnote or syllabus, is not part of the Court's opinion, perhaps leading to the confusion about the source of the quotation. As explained below, the Supreme Court rejected the arguments in the quotation, and the taxpayer lost the case.

Lucas v. Earl is a leading case in the area of U.S. income taxation, and stands for the Anticipatory Assignment of Income Doctrine. In the case, Mr. Earl was arguing that because he and his wife, in the year 1901, had made a legally valid assignment agreement (for state law purposes) to have his then-current and after-acquired income (which was earned solely by him) be treated as the income of both him and his wife as joint tenants with right of survivorship, the assignment agreement should also determine the federal income tax effect of the income he earned (i.e., only half the income should be taxed to him).

The U.S. Supreme Court rejected that argument, essentially ruling that under federal income tax law all the future income earned by Mr. Earl was taxable to him at the time he earned the income, even though he had already assigned part of the income to his wife, and regardless of the validity of the assignment agreement under state law. The Court in Lucas v. Earl did not rule that wages are not taxable.

=== Coppage v. Kansas ===
One case frequently cited by tax protesters for the "wages are not taxable" argument is Coppage v. Kansas with respect to the following quotation:

Included in the right of personal liberty and the right of private property-partaking of the nature of each- is the right to make contracts for the acquisition of property. Chief among such contracts is that of personal employment, by which labor and other services are exchanged for money or other forms of property.

Coppage was a criminal case involving a defendant convicted, under a Kansas statute, of firing an employee for refusing to resign as a member of a labor union. No issues of taxation were presented to or decided by the Court, and the word "tax" is not found in the text of the Court's decision.

=== Truax v. Corrigan ===
Tax protesters also cite or quote from the case of Truax v. Corrigan for the argument that an income tax should not be imposed on labor and at least arguably relating "labor" to a right of "property":

That the right to conduct a lawful business, and thereby acquire pecuniary profits, is property, is indisputable.

The Truax case involved a Mr. William Truax who owned a restaurant called "English Kitchen," in Bisbee, Arizona. A Mr. Michael Corrigan and others were former cooks and waiters at the restaurant. Corrigan and others allegedly instituted a boycott of the restaurant, after a dispute arose over the terms and conditions of employment. A strike was allegedly ordered by a local union with respect to certain union members employed at the restaurant. The restaurant's business was allegedly harmed, and Mr. Truax sued various parties on a variety of grounds. The lawsuit was thrown out by the trial court before the case could be heard, on the theory that Mr. Truax was incorrect as a matter of law. Mr. Truax appealed and the case eventually ended up in the U.S. Supreme Court. The U.S. Supreme Court ruled that the trial court should not have thrown out the lawsuit, but should have heard Mr. Truax's case. The case was sent back to the trial court so that a trial could take place. Truax was not a tax case. No issues involving taxation were presented to or decided by the Court.

=== Butchers' Union Co. v. Crescent City Co. ===
Tax protesters also cite the U.S. Supreme Court case of Butcher's Union Co. v. Crescent City Co. for the argument that an income tax should not be imposed on labor, sometimes quoting the following language:

A monopoly is defined 'to be an institution or allowance from the sovereign power of the state, by grant, commission, or otherwise, to any person or corporation, for the sole buying, selling, making, working, or using of anything whereby any person or persons, bodies politic or corporate, are sought to be restrained of any freedom or liberty they had before or hindered in their lawful trade,' All grants of this kind are void at common law, because they destroy the freedom of trade, discourage labor and industry, restrain persons from getting an honest livelihood, and put it in the power of the grantees to enhance the price of commodities. They are void because they interfere with the liberty of the individual to pursue a lawful trade or employment.

Butchers' Union Co. was a case involving interpretation of the Louisiana Constitution and certain ordinances of the city of New Orleans. The Court ruled that the Louisiana Constitution and the New Orleans ordinances did not impermissibly impair a pre-existing obligation under a contract when those laws effectively ended a slaughter-house business monopoly by the Crescent City Company. No issues regarding the power to tax incomes from businesses, vocations, or labor were presented to or decided by the Court, and the word "tax" does not appear in the text of the decision.

=== Murdock case ===
Tax protesters also cite the case of Murdock v. Pennsylvania (also known as Jones v. City of Opelika):

A state may not impose a charge for the enjoyment of a right granted by the federal constitution.

Murdock (or Jones v. City of Opelika) was a case involving the validity of a city ordinance (in Jeannette, Pennsylvania) worded as follows:

That all persons canvassing for or soliciting within said Borough, orders for goods, paintings, pictures, wares, or merchandise of any kind, or persons delivering such articles under orders so obtained or solicited, shall be required to procure from the Burgess a license to transact said business and shall pay to the Treasurer of said Borough therefore the following sums according to the time for which said license shall be granted. 'For one day $1.50, for one week seven dollars ($7.00), for two weeks twelve dollars ($12.00), for three weeks twenty dollars ($20.00), provided that the provisions of this ordinance shall not apply to persons selling by sample to manufacturers or licensed merchants or dealers doing business in said Borough of Jeannette.

A group of people who were Jehovah's Witnesses went from door to door distributing literature in the town. They failed to obtain the license under the ordinance. The case ended up in court, and went all the way to the U.S. Supreme Court, which stated:

There was evidence that it was their [the Jehovah's Witnesses'] practice in making these solicitations to request a 'contribution' of twenty-five cents each for the books and five cents each for the pamphlets but to accept lesser sums or even to donate the volumes in case an interested person was without funds. ... The First Amendment, which the Fourteenth makes applicable to the states, declares that 'Congress shall make no law respecting an establishment of religion, or prohibiting the free exercise thereof; or abridging the freedom of speech, or of the press ....' ... It could hardly be denied that a tax laid specifically on the exercise of those freedoms would be unconstitutional.

The protester argument appears to be that the federal government should not be able to tax income from labor because it would be a tax on an exercise of the freedoms mentioned in the quotation. The "tax" in this case was, in effect, a license fee imposed on door to door sales people under a city ordinance. The city was trying to exact the fee from Jehovah's Witness members who were going door to door. Questions about the validity of federal income taxes were neither presented to nor decided by the Court.

=== Redfield v. Fisher ===
Some tax protesters cite or quote from Redfield v. Fisher:

The individual, unlike the corporation, cannot be taxed for the mere privilege of existing. The corporation is an artificial entity which owes its existence and charter powers to the state; but the individual's rights to live and own property are natural rights for the enjoyment of which an excise cannot be imposed.

The argument seems to be that because "the individual's rights to live and own property" are arguably rights against which "an excise cannot be imposed," the federal income tax on income from labor should therefore be unconstitutional. However, Redfield v. Fisher is an Oregon Supreme Court case, not a federal case. No issues involving the validity of federal income tax laws were decided by the court.

=== Conner v. United States ===
Some tax protesters cite a case called Conner v. United States, with a quotation that "Congress has taxed income, not compensation" for the argument that wages are not taxable. This was the case cited unsuccessfully by LaKerra Sumter before the U.S. Court of Federal Claims in the case of Sumter v. United States. The Conner case involved the taxability of compensation paid by an insurance company to a policy holder whose house had burned down. The insurance company was reimbursing the homeowner for the costs of renting a place to stay after the home burned down — under the terms of the insurance policy. The insurance company was not paying "wages". The court was not presented with, and did not decide, any issue involving the taxability of wages.

=== Eisner v. Macomber ===
Some tax protesters have cited the U.S. Supreme Court decision in the case of Eisner v. Macomber for the theory that wages are not taxable, or for the theory that dividends are not taxable. The case dealt with a stock dividend on stock that was essentially equivalent to a stock split, as opposed to a cash dividend on stock. In the case of this kind of "dividend" the stockholder does not receive anything or realize any additional value. For example, if a stockholder owns 100 shares of stock having a value of $4 per share, the total value is $400. If the corporation declares, say, a "two for one" stock dividend that is essentially similar to a stock split (and the corporation distributes no money or other property), the stockholder now has 200 shares with a value of $2 each, which is still $400 in value - i.e., no increase in value and no income. The pie is still the same size — but it's sliced into more pieces, each piece being proportionately smaller.

More directly to the point, there has been no "sale or other disposition" of the stock. The taxpayer still owns the same asset (i.e., the same interest in the corporation) he owned prior to the stock dividend. So, even if his basis amount (generally, the amount he originally paid for the stock) is less than the $400 value (i.e., even if he has an unrealized or potential gain), he still has not yet "realized" the gain. The Court ruled that this kind of stock dividend is not treated as "income" to a shareholder.

The Court in this case did not rule on any issue involving the taxability of labor or income from labor, or wages, salary or ordinary "cash" dividends — where the stockholder actually receives a check from the company, etc. Indeed, the terms "wage" and "salary" do not appear in the text of the decision in Eisner v. Macomber.

=== Cases where wages or labor ruled taxable ===
The provisions of the U.S. Constitution authorizing Congress to impose taxes, duties, imposts and excises contain no express exceptions for taxes on wages or labor, or for taxes on income from labor. The courts have consistently rejected arguments that "wages" or "labor" (whether denominated as "labor property" or not) cannot be taxed under the Internal Revenue Code. The United States Court of Appeals for the Eighth Circuit has stated: "Taxpayers' argument that compensation for labor is not constitutionally subject to the federal income tax is without merit. There is no constitutional impediment to levying an income tax on compensation for a taxpayer's labors." See also:

- United States v. Connor (tax evasion conviction under 26 U.S.C. § 7201 affirmed by the United States Court of Appeals for the Third Circuit; taxpayer's argument — that because of the Sixteenth Amendment, wages were not taxable — was rejected by the Court; taxpayer's argument that an income tax on wages is required to be apportioned by population also rejected), at ;
- Parker v. Commissioner (taxpayer's argument — that wages are not taxable — was rejected by the United States Court of Appeals for the Fifth Circuit; taxpayer charged double costs for filing a frivolous appeal), at ;
- Perkins v. Commissioner (26 U.S.C. § 61 ruled by the United States Court of Appeals for the Sixth Circuit to be "in full accordance with Congressional authority under the Sixteenth Amendment to the Constitution to impose taxes on income without apportionment among the states"; taxpayer's argument that wages paid for labor are non-taxable was rejected by the Court, and ruled frivolous), at ;
- Sisemore v. United States (United States Court of Appeals for the Sixth Circuit ruled that the federal district court properly dismissed taxpayer's frivolous lawsuit based on taxpayer's tax return position that wages do not represent a taxable gain because wages are a source of income and are received in equal exchange for labor), at ;
- White v. United States (taxpayer's argument that wages are not taxable was ruled frivolous by the United States Court of Appeals for the Sixth Circuit; penalty — imposed under 26 U.S.C. § 6702 for filing tax return with frivolous position — was therefore proper);
- Granzow v. Commissioner (taxpayer's argument that wages are not taxable was rejected by the United States Court of Appeals for the Seventh Circuit, and ruled frivolous), at ;
- United States v. Russell (taxpayer's argument—that the federal income is unconstitutional on the theory that the law cannot tax a "common law right to work"—was rejected by the United States Court of Appeals for the Eighth Circuit), at ;
- Waters v. Commissioner (taxpayer's argument that income taxation of wages is unconstitutional was rejected by the United States Court of Appeals for the Eleventh Circuit; taxpayer required to pay damages for filing frivolous suit), at .

Related tax protester arguments with respect to wages paid by "employers" to "employees" are (1) that only federal officers, federal employees, elected officials, or corporate officers are "employees" for purposes of federal income tax, (2) that the inclusion of the United States government within the definition of the term "employer" operates to exclude all other employers from the definition, and (3) that with respect to compensation, the tax is imposed only on compensation paid to federal government employees. These arguments have been rejected in court rulings.

Another tax protester argument is that income from labor should not be taxable because any amount the worker receives in exchange for his or her labor is received in an exchange of "equal value," although an exchange in any true "arm's length" fair market value transaction is, essentially by definition, an exchange of equal value. See, for example, the decision of the United States Court of Appeals for the Ninth Circuit in United States v. Buras, in which the taxpayer's theory — that wages were not taxable because (1) "only profit or gain, such as that from the sale of a capital asset, constituted income subject to federal tax" and (2) "[w]ages could not constitute gain or profit because wages merely represent an equivalent exchange for one's labor" — was rejected. See also the decision of the United States Tax Court in Link v. Commissioner, where the taxpayer's argument — that pension income is "labor property" and that when taxpayer receives his pension income from his former employer for whom he once performed services (or labor), any amount he receives in exchange for his labor is a nontaxable exchange of equal value — was rejected. In Boggs v. Commissioner, a penalty of $8,000 was imposed by the United States Court of Appeals for the Sixth Circuit on the taxpayers for filing a frivolous appeal using the argument that a portion of a wage amount was not taxable as a return on "human capital."

Further, under the U.S. federal tax laws, even if labor were considered "property" the gain or income from "labor property" would be defined as the excess of the amount realized (for example, the money received) by the taxpayer over the amount of the taxpayer's "adjusted basis" in the "property" (see 26 U.S.C. § 1001). Since the taxpayer can have only a zero "basis" amount in his or her own labor — the personal living expenses incurred to generate labor being both non-capitalizable and, under 26 U.S.C. § 262, non-deductible — the "gain" would thus be equal to the amount of compensation received by the taxpayer. Compare Carter v. Commissioner, where the United States Court of Appeals for the Ninth Circuit stated: "The assertion that proceeds received for personal services cannot be given a 'zero-basis for the purpose of the assessment of taxation,' is frivolous. This is a variation of the 'wages are not income' theme, which has been rejected repeatedly by this court." See also Reading v. Commissioner (taxpayer's argument — that gain from labor of self-employed individual cannot be determined until the "cost of doing labor" has been subtracted from the amount received — was rejected; validity of 26 U.S.C. § 262, disallowing deductions for personal living expenses, was upheld). See also Burnett v. Commissioner (taxpayer's argument — that wages represent an equal exchange of property and, therefore, are not taxable income — was rejected). See also In re Myrland (ruling that a taxpayer is not entitled to deduct the value of his labor from his income in calculating his taxes).

=== Wages and salaries, the Sixteenth Amendment, and the Cheek case ===
In dicta in Cheek v. United States, the United States Supreme Court specifically labeled defendant John Cheek's arguments about the constitutionality of the tax law — arguments Cheek had raised in various prior court cases — as "frivolous." Prior to his conviction, John Cheek had specifically contended that the Sixteenth Amendment did not authorize a tax on wages and salaries, but only on gain or profit.

=== Monetary penalties for asserting the argument on tax return ===
The argument that wages, tips and other compensation received for the performance of personal services are not taxable income, the argument that such items are offset by an equivalent deduction, the argument that a person has a "basis" in his or her labor equal to the fair market value of the wages received, and variations of these arguments, have been officially identified as legally frivolous federal tax return positions for purposes of the $5,000 frivolous tax return penalty imposed under Internal Revenue Code section 6702(a).

== See also ==
- Tax protester history in the United States
- Taxation in the United States
