= Tax protester =

Someone who refuses to pay a tax claiming it is invalid

A tax protester is someone who refuses to pay a tax claiming that the tax laws are unconstitutional or otherwise invalid. Tax protesters are different from tax resisters, who refuse to pay taxes as a protest against a government or its policies, or a moral opposition to taxation in general, not out of a belief that the tax law itself is invalid. The United States has a large and organized culture of people who espouse such theories. Tax protesters also exist in other countries.

Legal commentator Daniel B. Evans has defined tax protesters as people who "refuse to pay taxes or file tax returns out of a mistaken belief that the federal income tax is unconstitutional, invalid, voluntary, or otherwise does not apply to them under one of a number of bizarre arguments" (divided into several classes: constitutional, conspiracy, administrative, statutory, and arguments based on 16th Amendment and the "861" section of the tax code; see the Tax protester arguments article for an overview). Law Professor Allen D. Madison has described tax protesters as "those who refuse to pay income tax on the basis of some nonsensical legal argument that he or she does not owe tax."

An illegal tax-protest scheme has been defined as "any scheme, without basis in law or fact, designed to express dissatisfaction with the tax laws by interfering with their administration or attempting to illegally avoid or reduce tax liabilities." The United States Tax Court has stated that "tax protester" is a designation "often given to persons who make frivolous antitax arguments".

Tax protesters raise a number of different kinds of arguments. In the United States, these typically include constitutional arguments, such as claims that the Sixteenth Amendment to the Constitution was not properly ratified or that it is unconstitutional generally, or that being forced to file an income tax return violates the Fifth Amendment privilege against self-incrimination. Others are statutory arguments suggesting that the income tax is constitutional but the statutes enacting the income tax are ineffective, or that Federal Reserve Notes or other relevant currencies do not constitute cash or income. Yet another collection of arguments centers on general conspiracies involving numerous government agencies.

Some tax protesters refuse to file a tax return or file returns with no income or tax data supplied.

== Origin of term ==
In the United States, the term "protest" as applied to a tax generally means "a declaration by a payer, esp. of a tax, that he does not concede the legality of a claim he is paying". Similarly, Black's Law Dictionary defines a tax protest as:

The formal statement, usually in writing, made by a person who is called upon by public authority to pay a sum of money, in which he declares that he does not concede the legality or justice of the claim or his duty to pay it, or that he disputes the amount demanded; the object being to save his right to recover or reclaim the amount, which right would be lost by his acquiescence. Thus, taxes may be paid under "protest".

At common law, and under some earlier tax statutes, the filing of a protest at the time of payment of an erroneous tax was a requirement in order for the payor to recover a refund of the tax at a later time. In the case of U.S. federal taxes, the rule was abolished by Congress in 1924. Under the current Internal Revenue Code of 1986, as amended, the taxpayer's failure to protest does not deprive the taxpayer of the right to file an administrative claim with the Internal Revenue Service (IRS) for a refund and, if the claim is not allowed by the IRS, to sue for a tax refund in Federal district court.

The term "protest" is also used to describe a taxpayer's formal written request for review, by the Appeals Division of the IRS, after the IRS issues a "Thirty-Day Letter" proposing an increased tax liability following an IRS examination of a tax return.

In 1972, the U.S. District Court for the Eastern District of Pennsylvania used the term tax "protestor" (protester) in United States v. Malinowski. This case, however, involved a taxpayer who was a member of the Philadelphia War Tax Resistance League who was protesting the use of tax money in the Vietnam War. The taxpayer was not making arguments that the tax law itself was invalid; he was essentially protesting the war, not the tax. The taxpayer had filed a false Form W-4, and admitted he knew that he was not legally entitled to claim the exemptions (allowances) he claimed on the W-4. Thus, Malinowski might be termed a tax resister rather than a tax protester. He was convicted, and his motion for a new trial or acquittal was denied.

A person could be both a tax protester and a tax resister if they believe that tax laws do not apply to them and also believes that taxes should not be paid based on the use to which the taxes are put. Some tax resisters have put forth legal arguments for their position—for instance that they cannot pay taxes for nuclear weapons development because this would put them in violation of the Nuremberg Principles—that could be considered varieties of tax-protester theories.

Beginning in the mid-1970s, U.S. Federal courts began using the term "tax protester" in still another, more narrow sense—to describe persons who raised frivolous arguments about the legality of Federal taxes, particularly income taxes. This particular technical sense of the term is the sense described in the remainder of this article.

== History ==
=== United States ===
While there have been people throughout history who challenged the assessment of taxes as beyond the power of the government, the modern tax-protester movement began after World War II. One of the first people to fit this description was Vivien Kellems, a Connecticut industrialist and political activist who specifically protested monthly tax withholding. In 1948 she refused to withhold taxes from the wages of her employees, based on the claim that the government had no power to require such withholding. The IRS then seized the money owed from her bank account. She brought suit against them and, in a book she wrote, asserted that she won, although she did not challenge the constitutionality of tax withholding itself. Other notable American tax protesters include Irwin Schiff, who argued that income tax was both illegal and unconstitutional. Schiff died in prison in 2015.

The Seventh Circuit Court of Appeals stated that people are attracted to the "tax protestor movement's illusory claim that there is no legal requirement to pay federal income tax." The court called the tax-protester arguments "wholly defective and unsuccessful." Ideas associated with the tax-protester movement have been forwarded under different names over time. These ideas have been put forth, for example, in the broader Posse Comitatus, Christian Patriot and sovereign citizen movements, which generally assert that the Constitution has been usurped by the federal government. One activist linked to the sovereign citizen movement, Roger Elvick, originated the redemption movement and conceived circa 1999–2000 the strawman theory, which asserts that it is possible to dissociate from one's legal person, thus becoming free of all legal obligations, including taxes.

=== Canada ===
Similar arguments are raised in the context of other legal systems, notably in Canada. Tax protester theories originating in the United States, such as denying the authority of courts, have spread into Canada, where they have been notably introduced by Eldon Warman, a student of Roger Elvick's theories who adapted them for a Canadian context. Warman originated the so-called "Detaxer" movement, which reused sovereign citizen pseudolegal concepts, including the strawman theory, and argued the illegitimacy of Canadian income tax law. Warman's theories were adapted by other Canadian Detaxer activists, including Russell Porisky and David Kevin Lindsay. As the Detaxer movement went into decline in Canada, its concepts were further adapted by the freeman on the land movement, created by Robert Arthur Menard. Freeman on the land ideas gradually spread to other Commonwealth countries. As with cases in the United States, Canadian courts have uniformly found these arguments to be invalid, and often incoherent.

== Arguments ==
In 1986, the Seventh Circuit observed:

Some people believe with great fervor preposterous things that just happen to coincide with their self-interest. "Tax protesters" have convinced themselves that wages are not income, that only gold is money, that the Sixteenth Amendment is unconstitutional, and so on. These beliefs all lead—so tax protesters think—to the elimination of their obligation to pay taxes.

Arguments made by tax protesters in the United States generally fall into several categories: that the Sixteenth Amendment was never properly ratified; that the Sixteenth Amendment does not permit the taxation of individual income, or particular forms of individual income; that other provisions of the Constitution such as the First, Fifth, or a "Missing Thirteenth Amendment" eliminate an obligation to file a return; that citizens of the states are not also citizens of the United States; that the statutes enacted by the United States Congress pursuant to their constitutional taxing power are defective or invalid; that the tax code does not apply to inhabitants of U.S. territories; and that the government and the courts engage in various conspiracies to conceal the above deficiencies. Outside of the United States, tax protesters raise similar conspiracy arguments, claims that they are not "citizens" under the jurisdiction of the court where the claim is brought, and claims about the validity of statutes imposing taxation.

Such arguments are usually summarily dispensed with when presented in the courts. For example, the Fifth Circuit once noted:

We perceive no need to refute these arguments with somber reasoning and copious citation of precedent; to do so might suggest that these arguments have some colorable merit. The constitutionality of our income tax system—including the role played within that system by the Internal Revenue Service and the Tax Court—has long been established... [Petitioner's argument] is a hodgepodge of unsupported assertions, irrelevant platitudes, and legalistic gibberish.

In that case, the court viewed the tax-protester arguments as sufficiently frivolous to merit the imposition of sanctions—in this case twice the costs spent by the government in defending the litigation—for even bringing them up. Similarly, a Canadian Tax Court judge found claims asserted by a "tax denier" in that court to be "an absurd blend of the ridiculous arguments... unintelligible, incomprehensible, meaningless, irrelevant and factually hopeless".

== Penalties ==
In the United States, protesting Federal income taxes is not, in and of itself, a criminal offense. However, a number of offenses arise from failing to pay taxes that are due, and from repeating arguments that have previously been invalidated by the courts.

=== Frivolous tax returns ===
The United States Congress has, however, enacted Internal Revenue Code section 6702 "in an effort to deter tax protesters from filing frivolous returns." This statute was enacted as part of the Tax Equity and Fiscal Responsibility Act of 1982.

The penalty under section 6702 is a civil (non-criminal) penalty, and is $500 for positions taken on or before March 15, 2007. For positions taken after that date, the penalty amount has been increased to $5,000. The Internal Revenue Service has issued a list of positions considered to be legally frivolous. Shauna Henline, Senior Technical Coordinator of the Frivolous Return Program at the Internal Revenue Service, has testified that the IRS receives about 20,000 to 30,000 frivolous tax returns per year, and that approximately 100,000 related letters and other documents are received each year.

In some cases, taxpayers have argued that section 6702, the "frivolous argument" penalty statute, is itself unconstitutional. That argument was rejected in Hazewinkel v. United States (taxpayer's arguments—that sections 6702 and 6703 violate both procedural and substantive due process because there is no right to a prior hearing, and that the word "frivolous" is unconstitutionally vague—were rejected). See also Pillsbury v. Commissioner, a case in which taxpayer Leecil Pillsbury's argument—that section 6702 violates the Fifth Amendment Due Process Clause of the Constitution—was ruled to be without merit.

In that case, the court also ruled the following taxpayer arguments about section 6702 to be invalid: (1) it is an unconstitutional Bill of Attainder; (2) it unconstitutionally authorizes the imposition of cruel and unusual punishment; (3) it unconstitutionally violates the doctrine of separation of powers; and (4) it unconstitutionally violates the taxpayer's First Amendment rights to petition the government for redress of grievances. See also Duke v. Commissioner (tax-protester argument that 6702 was unconstitutional was rejected by the court), Kane v. United States (taxpayer's argument—that because section 6702 does not define the term "frivolous," the statute is unconstitutionally vague—was rejected), and Hudson v. United States (taxpayer's arguments—that section 6702 unconstitutionally violates taxpayer's First Amendment rights, that section 6702 violates due process rights by failing to provide a hearing before assessment of a penalty, that section 6702 is an unconstitutional bill of attainder, and that section 6702 is unconstitutionally vague—were ruled to be without merit).

=== Frivolous litigation in United States Tax Court, and appeals of Tax Court decisions ===
In 1939, Congress enacted section 1117(g) (entitled "Proceeding Frivolous") of the Internal Revenue Code of 1939, giving the Board of Tax Appeals (now called the United States Tax Court) the power to impose a civil monetary penalty of up to $500 against any party who instituted a proceeding "merely for delay" before the Board of Tax Appeals. In 1954, this provision was continued with the enactment of section 6673 of the Internal Revenue Code of 1954. The current version of section 6673 (in the 1986 Code) provides that frivolous arguments may result in a penalty in U.S. Tax Court of up to $25,000. Similarly, the Internal Revenue Code also provides that the U.S. Supreme Court and the federal courts of appeals may impose penalties where the taxpayer's appeal of a U.S. Tax Court decision was "maintained primarily for delay" or where "the taxpayer's position in the appeal is frivolous or groundless."

=== Frivolous litigation in United States district court ===
In a non-criminal case in a United States district court, a litigant (or a litigant's attorney) who presents any pleading, written motion or other paper to the court is deemed to have certified that, to the best of the presenter's knowledge and belief, the legal contentions "are warranted by existing law or by a nonfrivolous argument for the extension, modification, or reversal of existing law or the establishment of new law". Monetary civil penalties for violation of this rule may in some cases be imposed on the litigant or the attorney under the Federal Rules of Civil Procedure.

=== Frivolous litigation in various other appeals ===
Congress has enacted section 1912 of title 28 of the United States Code providing that in the United States Supreme Court and in the various courts of appeals where litigation by the losing party has caused damage to the prevailing party, the court may impose a requirement that the losing party pay the prevailing party for those damages. A person who raises a frivolous argument in a Federal appeals court may also be subject to monetary penalties under Rule 38 of the Federal Rules of Appellate Procedure. In one 2007 case, for example, the Seventh Circuit issued an order giving such an attorney "14 days to show cause why he should not be fined $10,000 for his frivolous arguments", based, in part, on Rule 38.

=== Frivolous filing of misconduct complaints ===
The "Guiding Light of God Ministries," a tax protester group organized by Eddie Ray Kahn, filed about 2,000 official misconduct complaints against employees of the IRS. Some tax agents reported that these complaints had influenced their supervisors to order them to back off from audits and collection efforts against members of the group.

=== Treatment by Internal Revenue Service ===
Prior to the Internal Revenue Service Restructuring and Reform Act of 1998 (the "1998 Act"), the Internal Revenue Service had defined a tax-protester scheme as "any scheme without basis in law or fact for the ostensible purpose of expressing dissatisfaction with the substance, form, or administration of the tax laws be [sic; "by"] either interfering with tax administration or attempting to illegally avoid or reduce tax liabilities."

The IRS has not released records indicating whom the agency defined as "illegal tax protesters" (coded as TC-148). In testimony before Congress in 1997, former IRS historian Shelley L. Davis contended that the IRS kept lists of citizens "for no reason other than that their political activities might have offended someone at the IRS [….]" and she charged that "anyone who offers even legitimate criticism of the tax collector is [labeled by the IRS as] a tax protester […]"

After the 1997 congressional hearings, Congress responded with the 1998 Act. Subsection (a) of section 3707 of the 1998 Act now prohibits "officers and employees of the Internal Revenue Service" from designating a taxpayer as an "illegal tax protester" or using any similar designation for a taxpayer. By contrast, subsection (b) of section 3707 provides: "An officer or employee of the Internal Revenue Service may designate any appropriate taxpayer as a nonfiler, but shall remove such designation once the taxpayer has filed income tax returns for 2 consecutive taxable years and paid all taxes shown on such returns."

The IRS has prescribed procedures for its personnel to handle frivolous returns (whether considered valid returns or not) in the "Frivolous Return Program" section of the Internal Revenue Manual. The IRS has concluded, in Service Center Advice 200107034 dated November 15, 2000, that the statutory prohibition on the use of the term "illegal tax protester" by IRS personnel does not prohibit the IRS from maintaining a database of frivolous tax return filers as part of its Frivolous Return Program. IRS Advice 200107034 states (in part):

The Frivolous Return Program in Examination [an administrative component of the IRS] has the specific assignment of processing assessments of frivolous return penalties pursuant to [Internal Revenue Code] section 6702. The employees of that unit receive documents from throughout the country that IRS employees believe may qualify as frivolous returns under section 6702. The employees reviews the documents and determines how to proceed.

When the documents come into the Frivolous Return Program, employees enter initial data into a computerized inventory database. […] Initial data includes name, social security number, and tax examiner assigned the case. Later, a tax examiner reviews the documents to see if they qualify as frivolous. If the documents meet the frivolous test, the tax examiner does a compliance check to see if the taxpayer is properly filing returns. If the taxpayer is properly filing returns and is not potentially subject to a frivolous return penalty, then the tax examiner deletes the individual from the database […]

According to the IRS:

[…] Congress enacted section 3707 because of its concern that taxpayers may be stigmatized by a designation as an "illegal tax protester." […] Under section 3707(a)(2), the IRS is required to remove illegal tax-protester designations from its individual master file and disregard any illegal tax-protester designation in a place other than the individual master file in the case of any illegal tax-protesters designation made on or before July 22, 1998, the date of the enactment of section 3707. Although section 3707 prohibits the IRS from designating taxpayers as illegal tax protesters, it does provide that the IRS may designated [sic] any appropriate taxpayer as a nonfiler. However, the nonfiler designation must be removed once the taxpayer has filed income tax returns for two consecutive years and paid all taxes shown on the returns. Section 3707(b).

We conclude […] that Congress was concerned that innocent taxpayers may have been mislabeled as illegal tax protesters. However, Congress did not intend to limit the IRS's ability to maintain records and to make designations, other than the illegal tax-protesters designation, where such designations are appropriate.

As a result of the enactment of sections 3707 [of the 1998 Act] and 6702 [of the Internal Revenue Code], the IRS […] has tried to balance these competing obligations by focusing on the conduct of the taxpayers and specifically identifying those frivolous arguments asserted rather than applying a general label of tax protester.

The Criminal Investigation (CI) division of the Internal Revenue Service investigates reports of violations of the federal criminal tax statutes, including tax evasion under 26 U.S.C. § 7201, willful failure to file tax returns or pay tax under 26 U.S.C. § 7203, willful filing of false returns under 26 U.S.C. § 7206, and violations of other statutes, and refers tax cases to the Tax Division of the U.S. Department of Justice for prosecution.

In July 2008, the office of the Treasury Department's Inspector General for Tax Administration reported that the number of federal criminal tax investigations referred by the Internal Revenue Service to the Justice Department is at an eight-year high. According to the report, the fiscal year 2007 ended with 4,600 investigations. The increase is nearly 50 percent from fiscal year 2002 to year 2007. The report also concluded that federal criminal tax convictions increased by 6.7% from fiscal year 2006 to fiscal year 2007. The number of persons convicted in fiscal year 2007 was 2,155.

=== Treatment by the U.S. Department of Justice ===
In United States v. Amon in 1981, Alan Amon was convicted of filing a false withholding allowance certificate under 26 U.S.C. § 7205. Rather than having been indicted by a grand jury, Amon had been charged by the U.S. Department of Justice in a document called an information. He appealed the conviction, in part on the ground that the government's prosecution of him was "unconstitutionally selective." The United States Court of Appeals for the Tenth Circuit noted that the trial court had agreed that Amon was "selected for prosecution because he is an active and outspoken [tax] protester."

The trial court ruled that Amon's "status as an active protester was insufficient to establish selective prosecution" and that no illegal discrimination occurs where the government prosecutes individuals for actions they take in failing to comply with tax laws where an effect of the prosecution is "...to dissuade others from engaging in that kind of tax protest." The Court of Appeals agreed, stating: "Merely showing that the Government elected, under established IRS directives, to prosecute an individual because he was vocal in opposing voluntary compliance with the federal income tax law, without also establishing that others similarly situated were not prosecuted and that the prosecution was based on racial, religious or other impermissible considerations, does not demonstrate an unconstitutionally selective prosecution."

The Department of Justice may obtain a federal court ruling to the effect that a specific tax-protester activity constitutes the promotion of an illegal tax shelter under Internal Revenue Code section 6700 (26 U.S.C. § 6700), and may obtain a court order prohibiting that activity under 26 U.S.C. § 7408, as it did in the case of United States v. Robert L. Schulz, We the People Foundation for Constitutional Education, Inc., and We the People Congress, Inc.. The Tax Division of the U.S. Department of Justice prosecutes violations of the federal criminal tax statutes, generally after an investigation and referral of a case by the Criminal Investigation division of the Internal Revenue Service. See, e.g., subsection (d) of 26 U.S.C. § 7602.

As of February 2008, the Department of Justice was reported to be "planning a crackdown on the so-called tax-protester movement." United States Assistant Attorney General Nathan Hochman, the head of the Tax Division of the Justice Department, stated: "Too many people succumb to the fallacy, the illusion, that you don't have to pay any tax under any set of conditions […] That is a growing problem." According to a Bloomberg News report, the U.S. government has a 97 percent conviction rate in criminal tax denier cases. On April 9, 2008, Hochman announced the launch of the National Tax Defier Initiative, also known as the "TAXDEF Initiative."

=== Responses ===
Many United States Courts of Appeals have made blanket statements repudiating tax-protester arguments. For example, see the Seventh Circuit case of United States v. Cheek:

For the record, we note that the following beliefs, which are stock arguments of the tax protester movement, have not been, nor ever will be, considered "objectively reasonable" in this circuit:
(1) the belief that the Sixteenth Amendment to the Constitution was improperly ratified and therefore never came into being;
(2) the belief that the Sixteenth Amendment is unconstitutional generally;
(3) the belief that the income tax violates the Takings Clause of the Fifth Amendment;
(4) the belief that the tax laws are unconstitutional;
(5) the belief that wages are not income and therefore are not subject to federal income tax laws;
(6) the belief that filing a tax return violates the privilege against self-incrimination; and
(7) the belief that Federal Reserve Notes do not constitute cash or income.

== Arguments about constitutionality ==
The Supreme Court of the United States addressed tax-protester arguments in Cheek v. United States. John L. Cheek, a tax protester, had been prosecuted for tax evasion under 26 U.S.C. § 7201. In response to Mr. Cheek's arguments on appeal, the Court stated:

Claims that some of the provisions of the tax code are unconstitutional are submissions of a different order. They do not arise from innocent mistakes caused by the complexity of the Internal Revenue Code. Rather, they reveal full knowledge of the provisions at issue and a studied conclusion, however wrong, that those provisions are invalid and unenforceable. Thus, in this case, Cheek paid his taxes for years, but after attending various seminars and based on his own study, he concluded that the income tax laws could not constitutionally require him to pay a tax.

The Court continued:

We do not believe that Congress contemplated that such a taxpayer, without risking criminal prosecution, could ignore the duties imposed upon him by the Internal Revenue Code and refuse to utilize the mechanisms provided by Congress to present his claims of invalidity to the courts and to abide by their decisions. There is no doubt that Cheek, from year to year, was free to pay the tax that the law purported to require, file for a refund and, if denied, present his claims of invalidity, constitutional or otherwise, to the courts. See 26 U.S.C. 7422. Also, without paying the tax, he could have challenged claims of tax deficiencies in the Tax Court, 6213, with the right to appeal to a higher court if unsuccessful. 7482(a)(1). Cheek took neither course in some years, and, when he did, was unwilling to accept the outcome. As we see it, he is in no position to claim that his good-faith belief about the validity of the Internal Revenue Code negates willfulness or provides a defense to criminal prosecution under 7201 and 7203. Of course, Cheek was free in this very case to present his claims of invalidity and have them adjudicated, but, like defendants in criminal cases in other contexts who "willfully" refuse to comply with the duties placed upon them by the law, he must take the risk of being wrong.

After a remand by the Supreme Court, Mr. Cheek was ultimately convicted, and the conviction was upheld on appeal. The Supreme Court refused to hear Mr. Cheek's petition for review of his conviction after the remand, and he was sent to prison.

If a jury finds that a criminal defendant had a subjective good-faith belief due to a misunderstanding based on the complexity of the tax law (and not based on an argument about its constitutionality), that belief may be a defense with respect to the element of willfulness, even if the belief is unreasonable. This is due to the general mens rea requirement needed to hold someone criminally liable and the specific intent (required by the word "willfully" in the statute) as defined in Cheek and other cases (see specific intent crimes). Persons acquitted of criminal tax evasion may still be sued civilly, and may be required to pay the taxes assessed, along with civil penalties.

== See also ==
- Christian Patriot
- Civil disobedience
- David Wynn Miller
- Freeman on the land movement
- Full payment rule
- Redemption movement
- Sovereign Citizen Movement
- Tax choice
- Tax resistance
- Tax resistance in the United States
- Potentially dangerous taxpayer (IRS designation)
