= Tax protester administrative arguments =

Tax protesters in the United States advance a number of administrative arguments asserting that the assessment and collection of the federal income tax violates regulations enacted by responsible agencies –primarily the Internal Revenue Service (IRS)– tasked with carrying out the statutes enacted by the United States Congress and signed into law by the President. Such arguments generally include claims that the administrative agency fails to create a duty to pay taxes, or that its operation conflicts with some other law, or that the agency is not authorized by statute to assess or collect income taxes, to seize assets to satisfy tax claims, or to penalize persons who fail to file a return or pay the tax.

Administrative arguments are distinct from constitutional, statutory, and general conspiracy arguments. Unlike other theories put forward by tax protesters, administrative arguments accept that Congress has the authority to enact income taxes and has in fact done so, but that the authorities charged with collecting the taxes (principally the Internal Revenue Service and its employees) do this in a manner that is in violation of US administrative law.

== Arguments about tax administration and process ==
Some arguments relate to the regulatory process, the authority of IRS employees to assert penalties, the IRS authority to seize assets, or the validity of IRS tax forms.

=== Arguments about lack of regulations ===
Some tax protesters have tried to argue that because the Department of the Treasury has promulgated official regulations for some but not all Internal Revenue Code provisions, there can be no obligation to file income tax returns or pay taxes. The courts have uniformly rejected this argument, ruling that duties imposed by statute cannot be avoided merely because the IRS or some other agency has not promulgated a regulation under that statute, and that the mere fact that a statute specifies that an agency is authorized to promulgate a regulation does not necessarily mean that the agency is required to do so.

For court decisions on the "lack of regulations" arguments, see Carpa v. Smith; United States v. Langert; Russell v. United States; United States v. Washington; United States v. Hicks.

=== Arguments about authority of IRS employees to collect penalties ===
Some tax protesters argue that even if the Internal Revenue Code provides for penalties, IRS employees do not have the authority to assert penalties—basing the argument on Internal Revenue Code section 6020(b)(1) which states:

Authority of Secretary to execute return.
If any person fails to make any return required by any internal revenue law or regulation made thereunder at the time prescribed therefor, or makes, willfully or otherwise, a false or fraudulent return, the Secretary shall make such return from his own knowledge and from such information as he can obtain through testimony or otherwise.

Some protesters contend that this provision shows that IRS agents have no authority to impose penalties unless they have a delegation from the Secretary of the Treasury.

Tax protesters sometimes assert that court decisions that IRS agents have delegated powers from the Secretary of the Treasury constitute a blatant disregard for the law, which tax protesters cite as proof that the finding of the court is somehow opposite of what the law says. At any rate, under 26 U.S.C. § 6020, 26 U.S.C. § 7701(a)(11)(B), and 26 U.S.C. § 7701(a)(12)(A)(i) and the Treasury regulation at 26 C.F.R. section 301.6020-1(a)(1), IRS agents do indeed have the delegated power to prepare section 6020(b) returns (see Craig v. Lowe). See also Delegation Order 5-2, which specifically delegates this authority to Internal Revenue Agents, to Tax Auditors, to Revenue Officers of grade GS-9 and above, and to various other IRS personnel. In Craig, the taxpayer argued that only the Secretary of the Treasury himself or herself was authorized under section 6020 to prepare returns for taxpayers despite the plain language of section 6020 which uses the word "Secretary" (without the phrase "of the Treasury"). Under section 7701(a)(11)(B), where used in the Internal Revenue Code without the phrase "of the Treasury," the term "Secretary" means the "Secretary of the Treasury or his delegate" (Italics added). The phrase "or his delegate" is defined in part as "any officer, employee, or agency of the Treasury Department duly authorized ... to perform the function mentioned or described ...". The Court rejected the taxpayer's argument, and ruled that an IRS Revenue Agent "plainly falls" within the cited Treasury regulation.

Another group of protesters claims the existing law demands income tax only from federal employees and residents of US territories. Their argument does not rely on nonpassage of the 16th Amendment, but does suggest it. They have asked the IRS and other authorities to cite the laws requiring others to pay income tax. This group claims never to have received an answer.

=== Arguments about authority of IRS employees to seize assets ===
Some tax protesters argue that the Internal Revenue Service has no authority to seize assets to satisfy tax claims. For example, tax protester Irwin Schiff's web site, in reference to the 2005 Federal trial resulting in his most recent conviction and imprisonment on tax charges, includes the statement: "... the Government’s prosecutors and Judge Dawson interceded in order to prevent me from proving that all IRS seizures are illegal, and not provided for by law."

In United States v. Rodgers, the United States Supreme Court stated:

Administrative levy, unlike an ordinary lawsuit, and unlike the procedure described in §7403, does not require any judicial intervention, and it is up to the taxpayer, if he so chooses, to go to court if he claims that the assessed amount was not legally owing.

Similarly, in United States v. Baggot, the Supreme Court stated:

The IRS need never go into court to assess and collect the amount owed; it is empowered to collect the tax by nonjudicial means (such as levy on property or salary, 26 U. S. C. §§ 6331, 6332), without having to prove to a court the validity of the underlying tax liability.

After the decisions in Rodgers and Baggot, Congress provided for limited exceptions to the general rule that court approval is not required for a levy by the Internal Revenue Service. For example, an IRS levy on a principal residence must be approved in writing by a federal district court judge or magistrate.

The statute authorizing the Internal Revenue Service to seize assets without going to court is 26 U.S.C. § 6331. In the case of Brian v. Gugin, a group of taxpayers (including a Mr. Ralph Brian) sued a group of IRS and other government employees, (including Ms. Phylis Gugin), for what the taxpayers claimed was a violation of their rights. The following is an excerpt from the court’s decision in the case:

The plaintiffs' premise for their complaint is that the IRS agents were required to have a court order in order to be able to legally seize property for delinquent taxes. Unfortunately, this is a faulty premise. Title 26 U.S.C. §6331 authorizes the IRS to seize property of any person liable for any tax upon ten days notice. The plaintiffs are incorrect in stating that §§6331 and 6321 only apply to the Bureau of Alcohol, Tobacco and Firearms. The statute specifically states that any person may have their property levied upon. 26 U.S.C. §§6331(a) and 6321. The plaintiffs also cite 26 U.S.C. §7402 which grants jurisdiction to the district courts to issue orders, processes and judgments as well as enforce IRS summons. This section does not require a court order in order to levy on property under §6331.

A "levy" by definition is a summary non-judicial process which provides the IRS with prompt and convenient method for satisfying delinquent tax claims. ... [T]he IRS has the option under §6502 to collect its assessment by either a levy or a court proceeding ...

Accordingly, the IRS agents were acting within the authority granted under §6331 and no court order was required for the attempted levy on Ralph Brian's property. Concerning the constitutional violations alleged by the plaintiffs, this court cannot find that any constitutional rights were allegedly violated if the attempted seizure was lawful under §6331.

It is important to note that the plaintiff Ralph Brian is not without a course of action under the Internal Revenue Code. If the delinquent taxes claimed are not delinquent, the taxpayer may bring an action with the IRS for a refund.

In a variation on this argument, some tax protesters have argued that section 6331 of the Internal Revenue Code should allow the IRS to seize only the salary of an officer, employee, or elected official of the United States or the District of Columbia. This argument was rejected by the United States Supreme Court in Sims v. United States. Tax protesters have presented variations of this argument, which the courts have ruled to be without legal merit. See, e.g., the decision of the United States Court of Appeals for the Tenth Circuit in James v. United States. See also Peth v. Breitzmann; Pawlowske v. Chrysler Corp.; and Craig v. Lowe. See also the decision of the United States Court of Appeals for the Ninth Circuit in Maisano v. Welcher.

Since at least 1867, the Federal tax collector has also held the power to sell property of a delinquent taxpayer to satisfy a Federal income tax liability, even before physically ejecting the taxpayer from the property. See the United States Supreme Court decision in the case of Springer v. United States.

=== Arguments that the IRS must follow the Fair Debt Collection Act ===
At least one tax protester has argued that the IRS must follow the Federal Fair Debt Collection Practices Act, also known as the Fair Debt Collection Act. This argument was rejected in Smith v. United States, where the United States Court of Appeals for the Fifth Circuit stated that the taxpayer's: "... invocation of the Fair Debt Collection Act is entirely without merit, as the statute expressly excludes 'any officer or employee of the United States . . . to the extent that collecting or attempting to collect any debt is in the performance of his official duties' from the definition of 'debt collector.' 15 U.S.C. section 1692a(6)(C)."

In 1998, Congress amended the Internal Revenue Code by adding a new section 6304, "Fair Tax Collection Practices," which refers to and includes certain rules that are similar to some provisions of the Fair Debt Collection Practices Act. The office of the Treasury Inspector General for Tax Administration reviews IRS tax collection practices under section 6304.

=== The Paperwork Reduction Act (OMB control number) argument ===
One contention of tax protesters is that they are not liable to file returns or pay taxes because, they argue, Form 1040 or some other Federal tax form, or the related instructions, or a Treasury Regulation, does not contain an "OMB control number" (a number issued by the U.S. Office of Management and Budget under the Paperwork Reduction Act.) The courts have rejected the OMB control number arguments, primarily on two grounds: (1) With respect to Form 1040 itself, Form 1040, U.S. Individual Income Tax Return, does contain the OMB control number, and has included the number for every tax year since 1981; and (2) according to the court rulings (listed below), the absence of an OMB control number on a tax form (or instructions), or in tax regulations, would not eliminate the statutory legal obligation to file tax returns or pay taxes.

The regulations for the OMB control number under the Paperwork Reduction Act specifically mention statutory tax obligations, providing (in part):

§ 1320.6 Public protection.

(a) Notwithstanding any other provision of law, no person shall be subject to any penalty for failing to comply with a collection of information that is subject to the requirements of this part if:

(1) The collection of information does not display, in accordance with §1320.3(f) and §1320.5(b)(1), a currently valid OMB control number assigned by the Director in accordance with the Act...

(e) The protection provided by paragraph (a) of this section does not preclude the imposition of a penalty on a person for failing to comply with a collection of information that is imposed on the person by statute—e.g., 26 U.S.C. §6011(a) (statutory requirement for person to file a tax return)...

Additionally the Paperwork Reduction Act itself states (in part): "...this subchapter shall not apply to the collection of information ... during the conduct of ... a civil action to which the United States or any official or agency thereof is a party ... or ... an administrative action or investigation involving an agency against specific individuals or entities."

The courts have ruled that there is no legal requirement that an IRS tax form bear an OMB control number in order for a taxpayer to be legally obligated to file Federal income tax returns and pay the related taxes, and there is no requirement of an OMB number in order for the taxpayer to be properly convicted of tax crimes—as these are tax obligations imposed by statute and therefore cannot be obviated by presence or lack of an OMB control number on a tax form.

==== OMB control numbers and the Lawrence case ====
Some tax protesters have argued that criminal defendant Robert Lawrence was successful with an OMB control number argument when his case was dismissed by a federal court in 2006. According to the court record, the IRS agents who had calculated Mr. Lawrence's tax liability discovered errors they themselves had made—based on information obtained from Lawrence's own tax returns, regarding the taxpayer's tax basis in certain property Lawrence had sold. With respect to certain properties the taxpayer had sold, the IRS agents discovered that he had more tax basis than they had originally calculated—therefore, lower gains or even losses, and thus lower taxes. The IRS agents brought their errors to the attention of the government lawyers, who then asked that the charges be dropped.

Lawrence then asked the trial court to order the government to reimburse him for his legal fees. The court ruled against him on that.

He then appealed to the United States Court of Appeals for the Seventh Circuit—to try to obtain a reversal of the trial court's refusal to order the government to compensate him for the legal fees he had incurred. At the Court of Appeals, Lawrence contended that he should be reimbursed because the government's conduct against him had been "vexatious, frivolous, or in bad faith." He raised his PRA/OMB control number argument—an argument he had also raised at the trial court level.

In March 2007 the United States Court of Appeals for the Seventh Circuit rejected the OMB argument. The Court also rejected his request for reimbursement for the legal fees he incurred. The following is an excerpt from the Court's decision:

According to Lawrence, the Paperwork Reduction Act of 1995 (PRA) required the Internal Revenue Service to display valid Office of Management and Budget (OMB) numbers on its Form 1040.... Lawrence argues that the PRA by its terms prohibits the government from imposing a criminal penalty upon a citizen for the failure to complete a form where the information request at issue does not comply with the PRA. Lawrence never explains how this argument is even relevant to the three counts involving tax evasion, but even as to the other three counts, it must fail ... Lawrence's brief represents an attempt to prove that the PRA could present a valid defense to the criminal charges. Yet Lawrence conceded at oral argument that no case from this circuit establishes such a proposition, and in fact Lawrence cites no caselaw from any jurisdiction that so holds. In contrast, the government referenced numerous cases supporting its position that the PRA does not present a defense to a criminal action for failure to file income taxes ... Lawrence provides no explanation of how government conduct can be vexatious, frivolous, or in bad faith when there is no law contrary to it."

==== The Wunder case ====
In the case of United States v. Wunder, the United States Court of Appeals for the Sixth Circuit stated:

Although the defendant constructs an elaborate argument as to why section 3512 [of title 44 of the United States Code, relating to the Paperwork Reduction Act (PRA)] should apply to this case, ... we are unable to see how section 3512 is relevant. This section, by its terms, applies only to information requests made after December 31, 1981. The tax years in question here were 1979, 1980, and 1981. Clearly, tax returns for 1979 and 1980 would not be affected by the PRA. As for the 1981 return, it did display the appropriate control number, and the regulations do not need a number because the requirement to file a tax return is mandated by statute, not by regulation. Defendant was not convicted of violating a regulation but of violating a statute which required him to file an income tax return. ... The Paperwork Reduction Act, therefore, does not apply to the statutory requirement, but only to the forms themselves, which contained the appropriate numbers.

==== The Patridge case ====
In the case of United States v. Patridge, the United States Court of Appeals for the Seventh Circuit affirmed a tax evasion conviction, and rejected the convicted taxpayer's OMB control number argument, with these words:

Finally, we have no doubt that the IRS has complied with the Paperwork Reduction Act. Form 1040 bears a control number from OMB, as do the other forms the IRS commonly distributes to taxpayers. That this number has been constant since 1981 does not imply that OMB has shirked its duty. Section 3507 [of the Paperwork Reduction Act] requires periodic review, not a periodic change in control numbers. Patridge [the taxpayer] offers us no reason to think that the necessary review has not been conducted. The control number on Form 1040 appears on OMB's web site as a current, valid number; if this is wrong, it takes more than a lawyer's say-so to establish the proposition. That OMB didn't re-review Form 1040 between the 1995 and 1996 tax year is irrelevant; nothing in the 1995 amendments [to the Paperwork Reduction Act] says that all existing approvals become invalid or that all forms must be resubmitted.

In the same case, the Court of Appeals rejected the taxpayer's argument that the Paperwork Reduction Act could block a tax evasion conviction:

How any of this could block a conviction for tax evasion is a mystery. Patridge evaded taxes by shuffling his income among trusts in an attempt to conceal it from the IRS. That crime does not depend on the contents of any form. Evading one's taxes is illegal independent of the information one does or does not supply. Consider another example: the Clean Air Act requires businesses to curtail certain emissions using the best available technology, and to report on those emissions to the EPA. An error in the EPA's forms might spare the business any penalties for bad information but would not license it to emit pollution without limit. The Paperwork Reduction Act does not change any substantive obligation.

==== Other cases involving OMB control numbers ====
Despite the presence of the OMB control number on Form 1040 and despite the language of regulation 1320.6(e) above, tax protesters have repeatedly litigated several variations of the "OMB control number argument" without success. See McDougall v. Commissioner (taxpayer's argument—that the 1987 Form 1040 fails to display an OMB control number—was rejected by the Court, with the Court stating that the 1987 Form 1040 does contain the OMB control number, in upper right corner of form; taxpayer's argument—that Form 1040 lacks the Privacy Act and Paperwork Reduction Act notice—was rejected by the Court, with the Court noting that the statement appears in the instructions for the form and further noting that a failure to comply with the Paperwork Reduction Act would not invalidate an IRS form, as the "mandate for collecting Federal income tax information comes from Congress"); United States v. Barker (taxpayer's argument—that IRS forms must carry valid control numbers from the Office of Management and Budget to be valid—was rejected); Salberg v. United States (taxpayer's argument—that although the 1981 Form 1040 contains an OMB control number, the form is invalid because it does not contain an expiration date—was rejected; Court rules that even if the law required an expiration date, the "1981" date on the form would so qualify as an expiration date); United States v. Cavins (taxpayer convicted of tax evasion argued that his indictment should have been thrown out because Form 1040 did not comply with the Paperwork Reduction Act; argument was rejected by the United States Court of Appeals for the Eighth Circuit. The Court stated: "An OMB control number is clearly displayed at the top of each form. If the Form 1040 displays the control number required by § 3512, 'nothing more is required.'"); United States v. Dawes (taxpayer's argument—that the tax regulations and IRS instruction books must contain an OMB control number—was rejected); Lonsdale v. United States (taxpayer's argument—that relevant IRS forms in connection with summonses, liens or levies must contain OMB control numbers for the summonses, liens or levies to be valid—was rejected); Karkabe v. Commissioner (taxpayer's arguments—that Form 1040 did not display a valid OMB control number, and that the Form 1040 was "bootleg" and "illegal" -- were rejected by the court). Pate v. Commissioner (taxpayer's OMB control number argument—that the Paperwork Reduction Act "may in some manner negate statutory penalties for failure to file tax returns and pay taxes" -- was ruled to be without merit, with the U.S. Tax Court stating that the "requirement to file tax returns and the imposition of penalties for failing to do so represents a 'legislative command, not an administrative request'", and that the Paperwork Reduction Act "provides no 'escape hatch' from penalties for failing to file tax returns"; taxpayer's argument—that under Pond v. Commissioner, the 1995 amendments to the Paperwork Reduction Act "call into question" certain well-established judicial precedents—was rejected).

Lindsey K. Springer, a proponent of the Paperwork Reduction Act/OMB control number argument, raised the issue in his own federal criminal tax case. His argument was rejected by the court, and the jury found him guilty of one count of conspiracy to defraud the IRS, three counts of tax evasion, and two counts of willful failure to file federal income tax returns.

The OMB control number argument and variations of this argument have been officially identified as legally frivolous Federal tax return positions for purposes of the $5,000 frivolous tax return penalty imposed under Internal Revenue Code section 6702(a). In Cargill v. Commissioner, an $8,000 penalty was imposed on taxpayer Judy Cargill under 26 U.S.C. § 6673 in connection with her appeal in which she persisted in making the OMB control number argument after having been notified that the argument was frivolous.

== Arguments about the status of the IRS ==
Some tax protesters argue that the IRS is not a government agency, or that the IRS is not mentioned in the statutes, or that the IRS has no authority in the absence of established internal revenue "districts," or that the IRS has no authority outside the District of Columbia.

=== Arguments that the IRS is not a government agency ===
Many tax protesters claim that because the Internal Revenue Service itself was not created by statute and because the IRS has no legal capacity to sue or be sued, the IRS is not a federal government agency. Some claim it is a Puerto Rican trust. Others claim that the IRS does not lawfully exist. The courts have uniformly rejected such arguments. As explained below, the "Internal Revenue Service" is referred to in statutes and regulations as an "agency," as a "bureau," and as an "administrative unit" of the U.S. Department of the Treasury.

Although the IRS, as a bureau within the Treasury Department, was not created by statute (and no law requires that the IRS, as a bureau within an executive department, be "created" by statute), the United States Supreme Court, in Chrysler Corp. v. Brown, specifically referred to the Revenue Act of 1862, the "Act of July 1, 1862, ch. 119, 12 Stat. 432, the statute to which the present Internal Revenue Service can be traced". (The 1862 Act created the office of Commissioner of Internal Revenue.)

Due to the doctrine of sovereign immunity, the IRS itself (along with many other Federal agencies) does not, as a general rule, have the capacity to "sue and be sued" -- a concept separate from that of whether the IRS is a U.S. "government agency." See, for example, Thompson v. Department of Treasury, Internal Revenue Service and United States of America, where the court stated that the "Department of the Treasury" and "Internal Revenue Service" are "federal agencies within the United States Government. Federal agencies may not be sued in their own name except to the extent Congress may specifically allow such suits". Also, "Congress has made no provisions for suits against either the IRS or the Treasury Department, so these agencies are not proper entities for suit. Where taxpayers are authorized to sue on matters arising out of IRS actions, the United States is the proper party defendant" (from Devries v. Internal Revenue Service.)

The United States Court of Appeals for the Tenth Circuit has rejected the argument that the Internal Revenue Service was not lawfully created. The Court also rejected the argument that the IRS is an agency of the "International Monetary Fund".

Similarly in Collins v. Internal Revenue Serv., a Federal district court stated:

The United States argues that the two named defendants, the Internal Revenue Service ("IRS") and Revenue Officer P. Blackard are not proper parties to this action. The United States contends and has provided authority to show that the IRS, as a division of the Treasury Department, is an agency of the United States. Although plaintiff denies that the IRS is an agency of the United States, applicable authority does not support his argument. The IRS is therefore protected by sovereign immunity and cannot be sued absent Congressional authorization, which has not occurred. Accordingly, the IRS is not a proper party to this suit. Similarly, defendant Blackard is protected by sovereign immunity and is not a proper party to this suit. The Court therefore dismisses without prejudice plaintiff's claims against the IRS and P. Blackard. Moreover, the United States is the only proper party to this action. Therefore, the United States is substituted as the defendant.

In Hawks v. Commissioner, the U.S. Tax Court ruled the arguments (1) that "there is no organization in the Department of the Treasury known as the Internal Revenue Service", (2) that the IRS "is not an agency of the United States", and (3) that the IRS is "an unlawful organization", to be frivolous. In United States v. Bell, the argument that "the Internal Revenue Service is an unregistered agent of Puerto Rico and not properly registered under the Foreign Agent Registration Act" was ruled to be frivolous.

=== Arguments that the Internal Revenue Service is not mentioned in the statutes ===
Some tax protesters claim that the Internal Revenue Service is not mentioned in the statutes. Imprisoned tax protester Irwin Schiff has contended that the Internal Revenue Service is not mentioned in Subtitle A (the subtitle dealing specifically with income tax) of the Internal Revenue Code.

The "Internal Revenue Service" is, however, mentioned in many statutes. For example, the "Internal Revenue Service" is mentioned in Subtitle A of the Internal Revenue Code (see, e.g., 26 U.S.C. § 42(m)(1)(B)(iii); 26 U.S.C. § 51(g); 26 U.S.C. § 105(j)(2)(B); 26 U.S.C. § 170(f)(11)(E)(iii)(II); and 26 U.S.C. § 501(p)(7)). Overall, the Internal Revenue Code contains at least 200 specific references to "Internal Revenue Service" (including references in headings of sections, subsections, etc.). Many Internal Revenue Code sections contain multiple references to "Internal Revenue Service" (for example, fourteen mentions in 26 U.S.C. § 6103, ten mentions in 26 U.S.C. § 6110, eighteen mentions in 26 U.S.C. § 7430, and thirty-six separate mentions in 26 U.S.C. § 7803).

At least nineteen references to "Internal Revenue Service" are found in titles 2, 5, 12, 23, 31, and 42 of the United States Code. For example, 5 U.S.C. § 500(c) refers to the "Internal Revenue Service" as an "agency" of the Treasury Department. According to the official web site of the U.S. Department of the Treasury, the Internal Revenue Service is a bureau located within the Department.

In section 1001(b)(2)(A), section 1001(b)(3), section 1001(b)(5), and section 1001(b)(6) of the Internal Revenue Service Restructuring and Reform Act of 1998, the IRS is repeatedly designated by Congress as an "administrative unit" of the U.S. Department of the Treasury.

The official U.S. Treasury regulations provide (in part):

The Internal Revenue Service is a bureau of the Department of the Treasury under the immediate direction of the Commissioner of Internal Revenue. The Commissioner has general superintendence of the assessment and collection of all taxes imposed by any law providing internal revenue. The Internal Revenue Service is the agency by which these functions are performed.

The "Internal Revenue Service" is also listed as a "component" and "agency" of the U.S. Department of the Treasury in the official government regulations for "Supplemental Standards of Ethical Conduct for Employees of the Department of the Treasury". The House Committee Report accompanying the Internal Revenue Service Restructuring and Reform Act of 1998, specifically refers to the IRS as being one of the "agencies within the Treasury."

The argument that the Internal Revenue Service is not an agency of the United States government, the argument that the IRS is a private-sector corporation, the argument that the IRS is an agency of some state or territory without authority to administer the internal revenue laws, and variations of these arguments, have been officially identified as legally frivolous Federal tax return positions for purposes of the $5,000 frivolous tax return penalty imposed under Internal Revenue Code section 6702(a).

=== Arguments about the lack of internal revenue districts ===
Some tax protesters have argued that because internal revenue districts or IRS district directors were abolished pursuant to section 1001 of the Internal Revenue Service Restructuring and Reform Act of 1998, the taxpayer should no longer be liable for federal income tax or should not be prosecuted for federal tax crimes. These arguments have been ruled frivolous in the civil tax context, in Barry v. Commissioner and in the federal criminal tax context, in United States v. Barry.

=== Arguments about authority of Internal Revenue Service outside the District of Columbia ===
Another argument raised by tax protesters is that under section 72 of title 4 of the United States Code, the IRS has no authority outside of Washington, D.C. That argument was rejected by the United States Court of Appeals for the Ninth Circuit in Hughes v. United States by the United States Bankruptcy Court for the Western District of Washington in In re Myrland, by the United States Court of Appeals for the Tenth Circuit in United States v. Springer, by the U.S. District Court for the District of South Dakota in United States v. Kuyper, and by the U.S. District Court for the Central District of Illinois in United States v. Barringer.

== See also ==
- Tax protester history in the United States
- Taxation in the United States
