= Eddie Ray Kahn =

American tax protester

Eddie Ray Kahn is an American tax protester. Kahn was imprisoned for tax crimes and was released on January 5, 2021. Kahn founded the group American Rights Litigators and ran the for-profit businesses "Guiding Light of God Ministries" and "Eddie Kahn and Associates." According to the U.S. Justice Department, all three organizations are or were illegal tax evasion operations.

On October 12, 2006, Kahn was charged, with actor Wesley Snipes and Douglas P. Rosile, with one count of conspiracy to defraud the United States under 18 U.S.C. § 371, and one count of making or aiding and abetting the making of a false and fraudulent claim for payment against the United States, under 18 U.S.C. § 287 and 18 U.S.C. § 2.

Kahn went to Panama after the 2006 indictment but was arrested and returned to the United States for the trial. During much of the trial, Kahn remained in his jail cell, refusing to participate and claiming that the court had no jurisdiction. News reports indicated that Kahn "has no legal training but insists on representing himself and has made several missteps and peculiar motions. For example, he sought to be immediately freed because the indictment lists his name in all capital letters, and he claimed U.S. attorneys have no jurisdiction because Florida supposedly was never ceded to the federal government". These motions were denied.

On February 1, 2008, Kahn was found guilty on the charge of conspiracy to defraud the government and on the charge of making or aiding and abetting in the filing of a false claim. Wesley Snipes was found guilty on three misdemeanor counts of failing to file Federal income tax returns. Douglas P. Rosile was convicted on the conspiracy and false claim charges.

On April 24, 2008, Kahn was sentenced to ten years in prison.

Although already in prison, Kahn was indicted with four other persons on September 3, 2008, on charges of mail fraud, conspiracy to commit mail fraud, and conspiracy to defraud the United States. The indictment was handed down by a federal grand jury in Washington, D.C. The indictment charges that Kahn conspired to sell schemes based on deliberate misrepresentations of the legal basis of the U.S. tax system.

On May 26, 2010, Kahn was found guilty of conspiracy to defraud the United States and conspiracy to commit mail fraud as well as one count of mail fraud, in connection with the sale of worthless "bills of exchange" for the purpose of impeding the Internal Revenue Service and promoting other schemes to orchestrate tax fraud. Kahn was accused of manufacturing over $1 billion in fictitious financial instruments purporting to be drawn on the U.S. Treasury. Others found guilty in the affair were Stephen C. Hunter, Danny True, and Allan J. Tanguay. On August 30, 2010, Kahn was sentenced to twenty years in prison on these convictions.

Kahn was incarcerated at the Rivers Correctional Institute, a federal facility in Winton, North Carolina. As a result of his later convictions, his scheduled release date was changed from July 18, 2015, to April 21, 2026, but he was ultimately released on January 5, 2021. Douglas Rosile was incarcerated at the Federal Community Corrections Office in Cincinnati, Ohio, and was released on June 1, 2012.
