= Tom Cryer =

American lawyer (1949–2012)

Tommy Keith Cryer (September 11, 1949 – June 4, 2012), also known as Tom Cryer, was an attorney in Shreveport, Louisiana who was charged with and later acquitted of willful failure to file U.S. Federal income tax returns in a timely fashion. In a case in United States Tax Court, Cryer contested a determination by the U.S. Internal Revenue Service that he owed $1.7 million in taxes and penalties. Before the case could come to trial, Cryer died June 4, 2012. He was 62.

== Early life ==
Cryer was born on September 11, 1949 in Lake Charles, Louisiana. According to a resume published by Cryer on his website, Cryer graduated with honors from Louisiana State University (LSU) Law School in 1973, and was inducted into the LSU Law School Hall of Fame in 1987.Cryer was a member of the Order of the Coif, a law school honor society.

== Career ==
Cryer served as a Special Advisor and Draftsman at the Louisiana Constitutional Convention in 1973 and he argued cases before the Louisiana Supreme Court. He opened a solo law practice in 1975 and gained experience in civil and criminal matters.

== Assertions about taxation ==
On his website, Cryer made a variety of assertions about the legality of the federal income tax in the United States, mostly in regard to taxes on wages. He claimed that "the law does not tax [a person's] wages", and that the federal government cannot tax "[m]oney that you earned [and] paid for with your labor and industry" because "the Constitution does not allow the federal government to tax those earnings" (referring to "wages, salaries and fees that [a person] earn[s] for [himself]"). Cryer stated:

The income tax law, although it is carefully written to APPEAR otherwise, does not actually tax your wages, salaries and fees that you earn yourself because the Constitution does not allow the federal government to tax those earnings.

Cryer also asserted that:

[T]he law, which is carefully drawn to stay inside the Constitution, does not actually tax personal earnings, but the IRS publications, no more law than Time Magazine, say it does and by collecting taxes on personal earnings it has violated several fundamental constitutional restrictions.

== Indictments ==
In October 2006, Cryer was indicted on two counts of tax evasion (26 U.S.C. § 7201). In March 2007, two counts of willful failure to timely file tax returns (26 U.S.C. § 7203) were added to the charges. The indictment alleged that Cryer evaded over $73,000 in taxes in 2000 and 2001 by using a trust to receive payments of dividends, interests and stock income.

== Motions to dismiss tax evasion charges ==
Cryer filed four motions to dismiss the case against him.

The government responded by stating that Cryer, "asserted various tax protester claims...and courts have rejected and discredited these claims" and countered Cryer's claim that the income generated from his law practice is not taxable, citing Commissioner v. Kowalski, 434 U.S. 77 (1977) (payments are considered income where the payments are undeniably accessions to wealth, clearly realized, and over which taxpayer has complete dominion); Lonsdale v. Commissioner, 661 F.2d 71, 72 (5th Cir. 1981) (rejecting taxpayer's contention that the "exchange of services for money is a zero-sum transaction"); Reading v. Commissioner, 70 T.C. 730 (1978), aff'd, 614 F.2d 159 (8th Cir. 1980) (monies received from the sale of one's services constitute income within the meaning of the Sixteenth Amendment).

The court rejected Cryer's first motion, in which Cryer had contended that the indictment had failed to allege "affirmative acts." The court rejected Cryer's second motion, in which Cryer had argued that the Secretary of the Treasury had failed to comply with the Administrative Procedure Act by not publishing certain information in the Federal Register. The court rejected Cryer's third motion, in which Cryer had asked for dismissal on the ground that he had not, with respect to a trust mentioned in the indictment, created that trust for the purpose of evading taxes. The court rejected Cryer's fourth motion to dismiss, in which Cryer contended that his income, which was derived through the practice of law in Louisiana, was not "taxable income" as defined by the Internal Revenue Code, ruling the contention to be "without merit."

== Trial proceeds with reduced charges ==
The prosecution dropped its allegations of tax evasion, on which the law provides a maximum prison term of five years against Cryer on July 9, 2007. Cryer was then tried on two counts of willful failure to file tax returns, for which the maximum jail sentence is one year in prison.

Cryer was acquitted on July 11, 2007. Cryer did not make any of his arguments about the legality of the income tax to the jury itself. Instead he asserted that he really did not believe that he owed the taxes, so there was no criminal intent. According to the New Hampshire Union Leader:

Cryer convinced jurors that he genuinely believed he was not liable for the $73,000 in taxes the government says he owes for tax years 2000 and 2001. Absent proof of criminal intent, the jury acquitted him.

Although the jury was not convinced of Cryer's willfulness, the theories he raised in his motions for dismissal have been repeatedly coined as tax protester arguments.

== Civil litigation ==
On December 26, 2007, Cryer instituted a civil suit against the United States government, alleging that criminal investigators with the Internal Revenue Service violated 26 U.S.C. § 6103 and other provisions of law by disclosing confidential information and injuring Cryer's reputation during their criminal investigation of Cryer. Cryer alleged that IRS employees disclosed to approximately thirty of Cryer's clients that Cryer was under investigation, and that the disclosures violated the law.

Section 6103 generally prohibits disclosure of certain information by IRS employees, but also provides the investigative purposes exception of section 6103(k)(6). Under that exception, an IRS employee:

[...] may, in connection with his official duties relating to any audit, collection activity, or civil or criminal tax investigation or any other offense under the internal revenue laws, disclose return information to the extent that such disclosure is necessary in obtaining information, which is not otherwise reasonably available, with respect to the correct determination of tax, liability for tax, or the amount to be collected or with respect to the enforcement of any other provision of this title. Such disclosures shall be made only in such situations and under such conditions as the Secretary [of the Treasury or his delegate] may prescribe by regulation.

The related Treasury regulations provide that IRS employees:

[...] may identify themselves, their organizational affiliation with the Internal Revenue Service (IRS) (e.g., Criminal Investigation (CI)) or TIGTA (e.g., Office of Investigations (OI)), and the nature of their investigation, when making an oral, written, or electronic contact with a third party witness [...]

In May 2008, the court rejected Cryer's arguments, and his case was dismissed. The court ruled "that the disclosures at issue are covered by the 'investigative purposes' exception" of section 6103(k)(6). The court also rejected Cryer's claim that certain disclosures violated the rules on grand jury proceedings.

== Tax Court case ==
In 2009 Cryer's federal tax problems continued. On April 2, 2009, Cryer filed a petition in the United States Tax Court. Cryer's petition includes a copy of three statutory notices of deficiency issued by the Internal Revenue Service, all dated January 5, 2009, in which the IRS asserts that Cryer owes $1,719,436.71 in taxes and penalties for the years 1993 through 2001.

The IRS asserted that Cryer owed $848,806.00 in Federal income tax plus $615,384.37 in section 6651(f) penalties for fraudulent failure to file tax returns, $212,201.50 in section 6651(a)(2) penalties for failure to timely pay the taxes, and $43,044.84 in section 6654 penalties for failure to timely pay estimated taxes.

Cryer's statement in the petition, in explanation of why he disagreed with the IRS determination, was: "The amount of the claimed deficiency is disputed. The correct amount is $0.00." The trial, originally scheduled for January 10, 2011 in New Orleans, was postponed to December 5, 2011. On November 28, 2011, the Court granted a further delay to Cryer, with a requirement that both parties file a status report by January 9, 2012. On February 15, 2012, the Court granted another delay, rescheduling the trial for October 22, 2012, in New Orleans.

Cryer died on June 4, 2012.

== See also ==
- Taxation in the United States
