= Cheek v. United States =

- Supreme Court of the United States

Argued October 3, 1990 Decided January 8, 1991
- Full case name: John L. Cheek, Petitioner v. United States
- Citations: 498 U.S. 192 (more) 111 S. Ct. 604; 112 L. Ed. 2d 617; 1991 U.S. LEXIS 348; 59 U.S.L.W. 4049; 91-1 U.S. Tax Cas. (CCH) ¶ 50,012; 67 A.F.T.R.2d (RIA) 344; 91 Cal. Daily Op. Service 305; 91 Daily Journal DAR 371

Case history
- Prior: Certiorari to the United States Court of Appeals for the Seventh Circuit

Holding
- (1) A genuine, good faith belief that one is not violating the Federal tax law based on a misunderstanding caused by the complexity of the tax law is a defense to a charge of "willfulness", even though that belief is irrational or unreasonable; (2) a belief that the Federal income tax is invalid or unconstitutional is not a misunderstanding caused by the complexity of the tax law, and is not a defense to a charge of "willfulness", even if that belief is genuine and is held in good faith.

Court membership
- Chief Justice William Rehnquist Associate Justices Byron White · Thurgood Marshall; Harry Blackmun · John P. Stevens; Sandra Day O'Connor · Antonin Scalia; Anthony Kennedy · David Souter

Case opinions
- Majority: White, joined by Rehnquist, Stevens, O'Connor, Kennedy
- Concurrence: Scalia
- Dissent: Blackmun, joined by Marshall
- Souter took no part in the consideration or decision of the case.

Laws applied
- Title 26, § 7201 of the United States Code

Cheek v. United States, 498 U.S. 192 (1991), was a United States Supreme Court case in which the Court reversed the conviction of John L. Cheek, a tax protester, for willful failure to file tax returns and tax evasion, who was convicted again during retrial. The Court held that an actual good-faith belief that one is not violating the tax law, based on a misunderstanding caused by the complexity of the tax law, negates willfulness, even if that belief is irrational or unreasonable. The Court also ruled that an actual belief that the tax law is invalid or unconstitutional is not a good faith belief based on a misunderstanding caused by the complexity of the tax law, and is not a defense.

== Background ==
The defendant, John L. Cheek, became a pilot for American Airlines in 1973. Through the tax year 1979, Cheek filed Federal income tax returns. Beginning with the 1980 tax year, Cheek stopped filing Federal income tax returns. He began claiming up to sixty allowances on his Form W-4 withholding statement submitted to his employer.

From 1982 to 1987, Cheek was also involved in at least four civil cases challenging the Federal income tax. Among the arguments raised in those cases were: (1) the argument that he was not a taxpayer within the meaning of the law; (2) the argument that wages are not income; (3) the argument that the Sixteenth Amendment does not authorize an income tax on individuals; and (4) the argument that the Sixteenth Amendment is unenforceable. In all four cases, the courts stated that these arguments were erroneous. Cheek also attended two criminal trials of individuals charged with tax crimes.

John Cheek himself was eventually charged with six counts of willfully failing to file Federal income tax returns under 26 U.S.C. § 7203 for 1980, 1981, 1983, 1984, 1985 and 1986. He was also charged with tax evasion under 26 U.S.C. § 7201 for years 1980, 1981, and 1983.

=== Trial court ===
At his own criminal trial, Cheek represented himself. He also testified that around 1978 he had begun attending seminars conducted by a group that believed that the Federal income tax system was unconstitutional. Cheek stated that based on the seminars and his own study, he sincerely believed that the tax laws were being unconstitutionally enforced, and that his actions were lawful. Cheek specifically testified about his own interpretations of the U.S. Constitution, court opinions, common law and other materials. He testified that he had relied on those materials in concluding that he was not required to file tax returns, that he was not required to pay income taxes, and that he could claim refunds of the money withheld from his pay. Cheek also contended that his wages from a private employer (American Airlines) did not constitute income under the internal revenue laws. Cheek argued that he therefore had acted without the "willfulness" that was required for a criminal tax conviction.

==== Ignorance of law ====
Under U.S. criminal law, the general rule is that ignorance of the law or a mistake of law is not a valid defense to criminal prosecution (see also Ignorantia juris non excusat). However, there are exceptions to that rule. Some U.S. criminal statutes provide for what are known as "specific intent" crimes, where ignorance of the law may be a valid defense. The federal criminal tax statutes are examples of statutes for specific intent crimes, where actual ignorance of the law is a valid defense.

==== Erroneous jury instructions ====
Cheek was convicted, but during the jury deliberations, the jury asked the trial judge for a clarification on the law. The judge instructed the jury that an "honest but unreasonable belief is not a defense, and does not negate willfulness." The trial court also instructed the jury that "[a]dvice or research resulting in the conclusion that wages of a privately employed person are not income or that the tax laws are unconstitutional is not objectively reasonable, and cannot serve as the basis for a good faith misunderstanding of the law defense."

=== Appeals ===
Cheek appealed his conviction to the United States Court of Appeals for the Seventh Circuit, which upheld the conviction. The United States Supreme Court issued a writ of certiorari to review the case. At the Court, Cheek contended that the trial court had erred by instructing the jury that a misunderstanding of the law had to be objectively reasonable to negate willfulness.

== Opinion of the Court ==
Justice Souter took no part in the case, as it was argued the week before he joined the Court.

In its judgment, the Court produced two essential holdings:

1. A genuine, good faith belief that one is not violating the Federal tax law based on a misunderstanding caused by the complexity of the tax law (e.g., the complexity of the statute itself) is a defense to a charge of "willfulness", even though that belief is irrational or unreasonable.
2. A belief that the Federal income tax is invalid or unconstitutional is not a misunderstanding caused by the complexity of the tax law, and is not a defense to a charge of "willfulness", even if that belief is genuine and is held in good faith.

The Supreme Court reiterated that a finding of willfulness in a federal criminal tax case requires proof (1) that the law imposed a duty on the defendant, (2) that the defendant knew of this duty, and (3) that the defendant voluntarily and intentionally violated that duty. In explaining how the willfulness element must be proven, the Court distinguished arguments about constitutionality of the tax law from statutory arguments about the tax law.

In an opinion by Justice Byron White, the Court ruled that the defendant's belief that the tax laws were unconstitutional was not a defense, no matter how honestly that belief might have been held. To the contrary, Cheek's acknowledgement that his failure to file tax returns was based on a belief about constitutionality was viewed by the Supreme Court as possible evidence (1) of Cheek's awareness of the tax law itself (the Court stating that constitutional arguments reveal the taxpayer's "full knowledge of the provisions at issue and a studied conclusion, however wrong, that those provisions are invalid and unenforceable"), and (2) of the voluntary, intentional violation of a known legal duty imposed by the tax law.

However, Cheek's statutory argument—his asserted belief that his wages were not income under the statute (the Internal Revenue Code itself)—was ruled by the Supreme Court to be a possible ground for a valid defense even though that belief was not objectively reasonable, provided that the belief was actually held in good faith. The Supreme Court ruled that by instructing the jury that the defendant's statutory argument had to be based on a belief that was "objectively reasonable," the trial judge had erroneously transformed what should have been treated as a factual issue (for the jury to decide) into a legal issue. The Supreme Court stated that whether the defendant acted willfully is a factual issue to be determined by the jury, and that a valid defense of lack of willfulness could be found even though the defendant's belief is not "objectively reasonable." The Supreme Court remanded the case to the trial court for a retrial. The Court also provided guidelines that could be used by the jury at the retrial:

[...] in deciding whether to credit Cheek's good-faith belief claim, the jury would be free to consider any admissible evidence from any source showing that Cheek was aware of his duty to file a return and to treat wages as income, including evidence showing his awareness of the relevant provisions of the Code or regulations, of court decisions rejecting his interpretation of the tax law, of authoritative rulings of the Internal Revenue Service, or of any contents of the personal income tax return forms and accompanying instructions that made it plain that wages should be returned as income.

== Dissent ==
Justice Harry Blackmun, joined by Justice Thurgood Marshall, agreed with the Court's ruling that a belief that the federal income tax is unconstitutional is not a defense to a charge of willfulness. These two justices complained, however, about the Court's ruling that a genuine, good faith belief based on a misunderstanding of the Internal Revenue Code is a valid defense. In dissent, Blackmun wrote:

It seems to me that we are concerned in this case not with "the complexity of the tax laws," ante, at 200, but with the income tax law in its most elementary and basic aspect: Is a wage earner a taxpayer and are wages income? [...] [I]t is incomprehensible to me how, in this day, more than 70 years after the institution of our present federal income tax system with the passage of the Revenue Act of 1913, 38 Stat. 166, any taxpayer of competent mentality can assert as his defense to charges of statutory willfulness the proposition that the wage he receives for his labor is not income, irrespective of a cult that says otherwise and advises the gullible to resist income tax collections. One might note in passing that this particular taxpayer, after all, was a licensed pilot for one of our major commercial airlines; he presumably was a person of at least minimum intellectual competence.

== Cheek defense ==
Some tax protesters have cited this case for the argument that it is possible to avoid paying taxes without punishment by using the kind of defense raised by Cheek about a good faith misunderstanding of the tax law itself. The Cheek defense is available, however, only in a criminal trial, and not as a method to avoid the payment of tax. In addition, attorney Daniel B. Evans points out that the Cheek defense is logically self-defeating:

...[I]f you plan ahead to use it, then it is almost certain to fail, because your efforts to establish your "good faith belief" are going to be used by the government as evidence that you knew that what you were doing was wrong when you did it, which is why you worked to set up a defense in advance.

== Later developments ==
In the case of John Cheek:

The 48-year-old airline pilot said in a telephone interview that he had changed his views about paying taxes and was now "straightened out with the I.R.S." after paying the money he owed the Government and "substantial" penalties. From now on, he said, he intended to pay taxes.

Immediately after the ruling, Cheek's lawyer, William R. Coulson, stated that Cheek had "learned his lesson". Coulson described Cheek as a "gullible victim of the tax protest movement".

Further, the case was remanded for a re-trial. In the re-trial, the jury rejected Cheek's argument that he actually "believed" that wages were not taxable. He was again convicted. On March 13, 1992, Cheek was sentenced to one year and one day imprisonment, and he was placed on five years of probation. The conditions of probation were that he would cooperate with the Internal Revenue Service and pay his back taxes, and pay a fine of $62,000. The second conviction was upheld by the United States Court of Appeals for the Seventh Circuit, and the United States Supreme Court let that decision stand by denying review. Cheek was released from prison in December 1992.

At least one federal district court has indicated that, in the absence of either testimony by the defendant about his own belief or some other evidence that provides a link to the "taxpayer's mindset", the defendant's lawyer cannot require a court to give a "Cheek defense instruction" to a jury. That decision has been affirmed by the United States Court of Appeals for the Seventh Circuit.

== See also ==
- List of United States Supreme Court cases, volume 498
- List of United States Supreme Court cases
- Lists of United States Supreme Court cases by volume
- List of United States Supreme Court cases by the Rehnquist Court
