= Tax protester conspiracy arguments =

Tax protesters in the United States advance a number of conspiracy arguments asserting that Congress, the courts and various agencies within the federal government—primarily the Internal Revenue Service (IRS)—are involved in a deception deliberately designed to procure from individuals or entities their wealth or profits in contravention of law. Conspiracy arguments are distinct from, though related to, constitutional, statutory, and administrative arguments. Proponents of such arguments contend that all three branches of the United States government are working covertly to defraud the taxpayers of the United States through the illegal imposition, assessment and collection of a federal income tax.

== Conspiracy arguments in general ==
Tax protester Irwin Schiff, following his criminal conviction for tax fraud that resulted in the imposition of a 13-year prison sentence, released a statement asserting in part that "the entire federal judiciary is involved in a monumental, criminal conspiracy to collect income taxes in violation of law". Schiff's web site continues to state: "Since the income tax was repealed in 1954 when Congress adopted the 1954 Code, it is clear that for 50 years federal judges in conspiracy with U. S. Department of Injustice [sic] prosecutors have been illegally and criminally prosecuting people for crimes that do not exist in connection with a tax that nobody owes."

One tax protester web site, called www.tax-freedom.com, quotes from an article by William Cooper titled "BATF/IRS - Criminal Fraud", from the publication Veritas (issue no. 6, September 1995), as follows:

Investigation of the alleged Internal Revenue Service and the Bureau of Alcohol, Tobacco and Firearms has disclosed a broad, premeditated conspiracy to defraud the Citizens of the United States of America. Examination of the United States Code, the Code of Federal Regulations, the Statutes at Large, Congressional Record, the Federal Register, and Internal Revenue manuals too numerous to list, reveals a crime of such magnitude that words cannot adequately describe the betrayal of the American people. What we uncovered has clearly been designed to circumvent the limitations of the Constitution for the United States of America and to implement the Communist Manifesto within the 50 States. Marx and Engels claimed that, in the effort to create a classless society, a "graduated income tax" could be used as a weapon to destroy the middle class. ... Through the clever use of language, the government promotes the fraud.

Claims made in support of the income tax conspiracy include:

- The courts rely only on the many cases where tax protesters lost, and ignore those few where tax protesters prevail.
- The gold fringe around the United States flag, as displayed in all courts, designates them as admiralty courts, which cannot hear other kinds of cases, or signal that the court is operating under maritime law. No court has ever upheld this argument, as neither the presence (or absence) of a flag (or of any other standard or element of decor), nor the fringe on a flag (which has no heraldic or vexillological significance), has any bearing whatsoever on the jurisdiction of a court. In United States v. Greenstreet, the United States District Court for the Northern District of Texas noted:

Defendant Greenstreet's response to Plaintiff's motion for summary judgment identifies this Court as an 'Admiralty Court' without further discussing his allegation. If his reference is to be construed as a jurisdictional challenge, his motion is denied. Others have attempted to persuade the judiciary that fringe on a United States flag denotes a court of admiralty. In light of the fact that this Court has such a flag in its courtroom, the issue is addressed. The concept behind the theory the proponent asserts is that if a courtroom is adorned with a flag which happens to be fringed around the edges, such decor indicates that the court is one of admiralty jurisdiction exclusively. To think that a fringed flag adorning the courtroom somehow limits this Court's jurisdiction is frivolous ... Unfortunately for Defendant Greenstreet, decor is not a determinant for jurisdiction."

=== "Capital letters" argument ===
Some tax protesters (and occasionally persons brought before courts) have argued that because the titles of court cases identify the parties in all capital letters, the persons thus identified are "fictitious entities". In other words, a court hearing a case titled "STATE v. JOHN Q. SMITH" has no authority over the defendant, "John Q. Smith", because the capitalization of the name means the court is addressing a person who does not exist. Such an argument was made by Eddie Ray Kahn, a co-defendant of Wesley Snipes in the latter's high-profile tax evasion case. Kahn "made several missteps and peculiar motions. For example, he sought to be immediately freed because the indictment lists his name in all capital letters, and he claimed U.S. attorneys have no jurisdiction because Florida supposedly was never ceded to the federal government". The court denied these motions.

No court has ever upheld such an argument. See, e.g. United States v. Frech ("Defendants' assertion that the capitalization of their names in court documents constitutes constructive fraud, thereby depriving the district court of jurisdiction and venue, is without any basis in law or fact"); United States v. Washington ("defendant contends that the Indictment must be dismissed because 'KURT WASHINGTON,' spelled out in capital letters, is a fictitious name used by the Government to tax him improperly as a business, and that the correct spelling and presentation of his name is 'Kurt Washington.' This contention is baseless"). See also United States v. Ford (taxpayer's argument—that an IRS summons was invalid because the IRS capitalized all the letters in the taxpayer's name in the caption of a petition—was ruled to be frivolous). Similar arguments have been raised unsuccessfully about things such as the presence or absence of punctuation, or of a middle name or middle initial, or of unusual punctuation such as hyphenation peculiarly used by the party using the argument.

== Conspiracy theory regarding government employees and tax forms ==
One group, calling itself "We the People", has stated that government personnel are engaged in a conspiracy in connection with Federal tax forms and "OMB [Office of Management and Budget] control numbers" in connection with a criminal tax case involving a tax protester:

In sum, the PRA [the Paperwork Reduction Act] requires that all government agencies display valid OMB control numbers and certain disclosures directly on all information collection forms that the public is requested to file. [The defendant's] sole defense was he was not required to file an IRS Form 1040 because it displays an invalid OMB control number. Government officials knew that if the case went to trial, it would expose the fraudulent, counterfeit 1040. They also must have known that a trial would expose the ongoing conspiracy between OMB and IRS to publish 1040 forms each year that those agencies knew were in violation of the PRA. That would raise the issue that the Form 1040, with its invalid control number, is being used by the Government to cover up the underlying constitutional tort -- that is, the enforcement of a direct, unapportioned tax on the labor of every working man, women and child in America.

== Conspiracy arguments involving Zionism and Freemasonry ==
One convicted tax protester, Edward Lewis Brown, has charged that law enforcement officials who surrounded his property in a standoff over his refusal to surrender after his conviction were part of a "Zionist, Illuminati, Free Mason [sic] movement", and that the federal government had no jurisdiction in New Hampshire. The New Hampshire Union Leader also reported that "the Browns believe the IRS and the federal income tax are part of a deliberate plot perpetrated by Freemasons to control the American people and eventually the world."

In an interview on February 2, 2007, on the radio show Constitution for the Defense, Ed Brown said:

I'm not quite sure you understand the ramifications of what's going on right now. This is massive. This is international. We are fed up with the Zionist Illuminati. That's what this is all about. Loud and clear. Zionist Illuminati. Lawyers, whatever they are, okay, it's going to stop. And if the judge is a member of that, I know that McAuliffe [the Federal judge in Brown's tax case] is, I know that U.S. Attorney Colantuono is, they'd better stop. This is a warning. You can do whatever you want to me. My job is to get the message out, and I'm getting the message out, and I'm warning you guys—not you guys [referring to the radio show hosts], them—to cease and desist their unlawful activity in this country and every other country because once this thing starts, we're going to seek them out and hunt them down. And we're going to bring them to justice. So anybody wishes to join them, you go right ahead and join them. But I promise you, long after I'm gone, they're going to seek out every one of you and your bloodline.

The standoff between Brown and law enforcement officials ended with his imprisonment after his arrest in October 2007.

== Arguments about money ==
Some protesters have argued that Federal Reserve notes (better known as dollar bills) are not actually money, because the Constitution only permits the government to "coin" money, and requires that such money be exchangeable for gold or silver; therefore, printed bills are instead symbols for use in bartering, and being paid in dollars is not the receipt of taxable income. This argument was brought before a court in Wilson v. United States. The court responded:

The contention that paper money is illegal has been consistently rejected. ... Congress has exercised this power by delegation to the federal reserve system. 12 U.S.C. section 411. Federal reserve notes are legal tender for all debts, including taxes. 31 U.S.C. section 392 [now 31 U.S.C. § 5103]; Milam v. U.S. 524 F.2d 629 (9th Cir. 1974). The United States Constitution, art. 1, section 10, 'prohibits the states from declaring legal tender anything other than gold or silver, but does not limit Congress' power to declare what shall be legal tender for all debts.' U.S. v. Rifen, 577 F.2d 1111, 1112 (8th Cir. 1978). Since Congress has done so, there can be no valid challenge to the legality of federal reserve notes. United States v. Anderson, 584 F.2d 369, 374 (10th Cir. 1978).

Other occasionally encountered arguments from tax protesters include the notion that U.S. currency is valueless or unauthorized by the Constitution because the currency is fiat money untied to the gold standard. No court has upheld the validity of that argument.

The argument that Federal reserve notes are not taxable income when paid to a taxpayer because the notes are not gold and silver and may not be redeemed for gold and silver, and variations of this argument, have been officially identified as legally frivolous Federal tax return positions for purposes of the $5,000 frivolous tax return penalty imposed under Internal Revenue Code section 6702(a).

== Alleged immunity or exemptions for minority groups ==
Arguments have been made asserting that members of certain historically disadvantaged minority groups are not obliged to pay taxes. Such arguments have been made, and rejected, with respect to African Americans, Native Americans, and native Hawaiians. Similar arguments have been made in countries other than the United States. For example, such an argument was rejected in the case of a Māori citizen seeking to avoid payment of taxes in New Zealand.

== Civil liability ==
With respect to the failure to pay U.S. federal income tax, some tax protesters miss the distinction between civil and criminal liability. A verdict of acquittal in a criminal trial for non-payment of income tax does not relieve a defendant of civil liability (i.e., the legal obligation to pay the tax). After a criminal acquittal, the IRS can continue to seek money through levy or other lawful means. Generally, the amount of money due to the IRS is determined administratively by the IRS, and not in a criminal trial. (The amount of tax may, however, be calculated after the guilty verdict is reached in a criminal case—for purposes of determining the severity of the sentence.) Although there have been several well-publicized cases of acquittal in a criminal tax case, the IRS continues collection efforts, with many defendants finally seeking refuge in bankruptcy court.

A related concept is that under American jurisprudence, different standards of proof are required in civil and criminal proceedings. Normally, to be convicted of a crime, the defendant must have had a specific mens rea, or guilty mental state. For criminal violations of the income tax law, this generally means that the prohibited conduct (whether failure to file, failure to pay, or engaging in some affirmative act to evade the tax), must have been accompanied by an intentional violation of a legal duty of which the defendant was aware. By contrast, to establish civil liability to pay the tax, no mens rea on the part of the defendant is required to be proven.

== See also ==
- America: Freedom to Fascism, a film directed by Aaron Russo
- Freeman on the land
- Frivolous litigation
- Pseudolaw
- Redemption movement
- Sovereign citizen movement
- Tax protester history in the United States
- Tax resistance
- United States Federal Income Tax Personal Exemption
- Zeitgeist, the Movie
