= Irwin Schiff =

American activist (1928–2015)

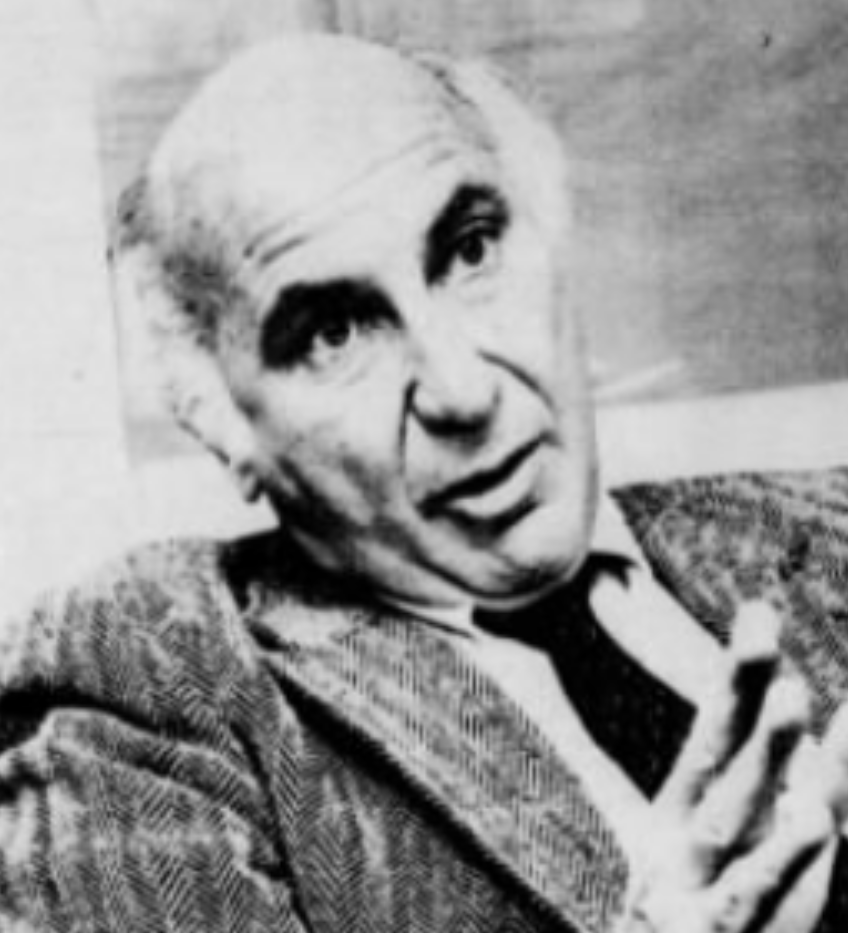
- Schiff in 1980
- Born: Irwin Allen Schiff; February 23, 1928; New Haven, Connecticut
- Died: October 16, 2015 (aged 87); Fort Worth, Texas
- Occupation: Tax resistance advocate
- Movement: Tax protesters
- Spouse(s): Ellen Wachsman (m. ??; d. 1967)
- Children: 2, including Peter

Irwin Allen Schiff (/ʃɪf/; February 23, 1928 – October 16, 2015) was an American tax protester, tax resistance advocate and libertarian. He was known for publishing and promoting literature about the illegality and unconstitutionality of U.S. income tax. Schiff also operated an office in Las Vegas, where he provided personalized tax counseling to his clients.

Judges in several civil and criminal cases ruled in favor of the federal government and against Schiff. As a result of these judicial rulings Schiff was in a hospital prison serving a sentence of 162 months (13.5 years) at the time of his death.

Schiff was the father of businessman and former United States Senate candidate Peter Schiff.

== Early life and career ==
Schiff was born to a Jewish family in New Haven, Connecticut. His parents were immigrants from Poland and his father worked as a carpenter. In 1950, Schiff attended the University of Connecticut where he obtained a B.S. with a double major in Accounting and Economics.

After college, Schiff was in the insurance brokerage business in Connecticut. In connection with his business, he was involved in a tax shelter in which he became the victim of a Ponzi scheme in which he lost money belonging to him and his clients. In 1968, he testified before the Senate Committee on Banking and Currency in opposition to the removal of gold backing from Federal Reserve Notes.

== Tax resistance activism ==
Schiff had filed income tax returns through the tax year 1973. For years 1974 and 1975, however, he refused to disclose his income. Instead, he sent unsigned 1040 forms to the Internal Revenue Service with the title ("U.S. Individual Income Tax Return") changed to read "U.S. Individual Income Confession." Instead of disclosing income, he included assertions of various constitutional rights on the forms, claiming essentially that under the Fourth, Fifth, Sixth, Seventh, Eighth, Ninth, Tenth, and Thirteenth Amendments he would not be an "involuntary serf" of the U.S. government. Schiff contended that because Federal Reserve notes were not backed by gold, they were not "income" for purposes of the federal income tax.

In 1976, Schiff published a book entitled The Biggest Con: How the Government is Fleecing You. He began conducting seminars on federal income taxes in 1977. On April 12, 1978, Schiff appeared on the NBC television program The Tomorrow Show with host Tom Snyder, arguing his views on federal income taxes.

Schiff operated his tax protester activities from a storefront in Las Vegas, where he would sell his books and tapes and do tax consulting. His appearances on national television shows made him a familiar media presence. Schiff also had a web site named "PayNoIncomeTax.com," which offered his various books for sale. He was featured in Hollywood producer Aaron Russo's 2006 film America: Freedom to Fascism.

In 2003, the Internal Revenue Service had identified about 5,000 tax returns filed by about 3,100 of Schiff's customers in a three-year period, reportedly representing about $56 million in attempted tax evasion.

=== Arguments raised by Schiff ===
Among the arguments raised over the years by Schiff:

1. That the Internal Revenue Service, in enforcing the income tax, seeks to impose a tax not authorized by the taxing clauses of the United States Constitution;
2. That no statutory deficiency in Federal income tax can exist until a voluntary assessment has been made;
3. The filing of income tax is explicitly voluntary, and "voluntary compliance" is a contradictory phrase used by the IRS to mislead the public;
4. That no tax assessment can be made unless a tax return has been voluntarily filed;
5. That the United States Tax Court has no authority to codify; and
6. That the United States Tax Court is not a legal court, but is instead a part of the IRS.
7. That "income" as properly defined according to his reading of court decisions and statutes, is not wages, but only corporate profits.

These arguments were ruled invalid in Schiff v. Commissioner. Another argument made by Schiff on his web site is: "On the [Form] 1040 itself... you report 'zero' income regardless of how much you received in: wages, commissions, interest, alimony, capital gains or from operating a business. For tax purposes, 'income' only means corporate 'profit.' Therefore, no individual receives anything that is reportable as 'income'." This argument has been rejected by the lower courts, as well as the United States courts of appeal. See Cameron v. Internal Revenue Serv.; Stoewer v. Commissioner; Reinhart v. United States; Fink v. Commissioner; Flathers v. Commissioner; Schroeder v. Commissioner; Sherwood v. Commissioner; and Ho v. Commissioner.

According to his son Peter, Schiff was "most known for his staunch opposition to the federal income tax, for which the US government labeled him a 'tax protester.' But he had no objection to lawful, reasonable taxation."

== Libertarian Party candidate ==
Schiff was a candidate for the Libertarian Party presidential nomination in 1996, and he participated in a Libertarian presidential candidates debate in Washington on July 5, 1996. He lost the New Hampshire presidential primary to Harry Browne, but won a plurality of the vice-presidential primary vote as a write-in candidate.

== Legal issues ==
=== Convictions for 1974 and 1975 tax years ===
Six days after his 1978 appearance on The Tomorrow Show, Schiff was charged with willful failure to file tax returns for the years 1974 and 1975. The modified, unsigned 1974 and 1975 forms, with no income information on them, were deemed by the Internal Revenue Service not to be valid Federal income tax returns under 26 U.S.C. § 6012. During the resulting trial, a videotape of the television program was shown to the jury. Schiff was convicted on both counts and appealed his conviction to the United States Court of Appeals for the Second Circuit.

At the Court of Appeals, the admission of the videotape was ruled unduly prejudicial, the conviction was overturned, and the case was remanded for a new trial. He was convicted a second time for failure to file, and that conviction was affirmed.

=== Convictions for 1980 through 1982 tax years ===
In October 1985, Schiff was convicted of tax evasion with respect to his personal income taxes for years 1980, 1981, and 1982, and willful failure to file a corporate tax return for Irwin A. Schiff, Inc. (a company for which he served as president), and that conviction was affirmed the following year. Schiff was released from the Federal prison system in June 1993. Despite having spent four years in the system, he continued his tax protest related activities.

=== Civil tax problems for tax years 1979 through 1985 ===
In June 2004, a Federal court ruled that Schiff was liable for over $2 million in taxes, penalties and interest for the years 1979 through 1985. In that case, Schiff's attorney had filed a brief claiming a diminished capacity defense, contending that Schiff had been diagnosed with a chronic, severe delusional disorder relating to his beliefs about the federal income tax system. That was characterized by some of his opponents as a claim that those beliefs were the product of a delusion or even insanity and that Schiff had willingly allowed his defense counsel to raise such an argument.

Schiff responded to these claims and stated that the diminished capacity defense was an attempt to prevent the judge from rendering a summary judgment and instead allow a jury trial. Schiff also asserted that this was different from an insanity defense. Schiff, in his statement on the matter, asserted that the judge erred in not putting this question to the jury and insisted that "(1) no one is required to pay income taxes; (2) the entire federal judiciary is involved in a monumental, criminal conspiracy to collect income taxes in violation of law." As of August 2015, Schiff's internet web site still included a claim that the U.S. federal income tax had been repealed in the 1950s and that U.S. officials were engaged in a conspiracy: "Since the income tax was repealed in 1954 when Congress adopted the 1954 Code, it is clear that for 50 years federal judges in conspiracy with U. S. Department of Injustice prosecutors have been illegally and criminally prosecuting people for crimes that do not exist in connection with a tax that nobody owes."

=== Case regarding The Federal Mafia ===
In his 1992 book The Federal Mafia, Schiff contended that the income tax system and Internal Revenue Service were illegal. On August 9, 2004, the Ninth Circuit Court of Appeals found the book to be fraudulent and upheld an injunction issued by a U.S. District Court in Nevada under 26 U.S.C. § 7408 against Irwin Schiff and associates Cynthia Neun and Lawrence Cohen against the sale of this book by those persons. The prohibition does not extend to other sellers of the book.

The court rejected Schiff's contention on appeal that the First Amendment protects sales of the book, as the court found that the information it contains is fraudulent, as it advertised that it would teach buyers how to legally cease paying federal income taxes.

Schiff, Neun, and Cohen were barred under the injunction from selling or advertising material advocating nonpayment of tax, from preparing a tax return for others, and from otherwise providing assistance or encouragement to others in violating tax law. Schiff and his associates were additionally required to provide a copy of the injunction to each of their customers, post it on their website, and provide the government with a customer list.

Schiff and his associates responded by providing the book for free on their website.

=== Convictions for 1997 through 2002 tax years ===
On October 24, 2005, Schiff was convicted in the U.S. District Court in Las Vegas, Nevada, on multiple counts of filing false tax returns for the years 1997 through 2002, aiding and assisting in the preparation of false tax returns filed by other taxpayers, conspiring to defraud the United States, and (for his own income taxes for tax years 1979 through 1985) tax evasion.

Despite Schiff's age (he turned 78 years old on the day of sentencing), on February 24, 2006, Schiff was sentenced to 151 months (12 years and 7 months) in prison and was ordered to pay over $4.2 million in restitution to the Internal Revenue Service; Schiff was also sentenced to 12 additional months for contempt of court. On December 26, 2007, the United States Court of Appeals for the Ninth Circuit affirmed Schiff's convictions except for the criminal contempt convictions. The Court vacated the contempt convictions because of the failure of the trial court judge to file contempt orders under rule 42(b) of the Federal Rules of Criminal Procedure.

The Court of Appeals indicated that the trial judge could file the appropriate paperwork and re-sentence Schiff on the contempt convictions. On September 5, 2008, the trial judge re-sentenced Schiff to 11 months in prison in connection with the contempt of court, effectively lowering Schiff's overall original sentence by another month.

One of Schiff's co-defendants, Lawrence Cohen, was sentenced on February 3, 2006, to 33 months in prison and was ordered to pay $480,000 in restitution. On December 26, 2007, the United States Court of Appeals for the Ninth Circuit reversed Cohen's conviction because of the failure of the trial court to allow testimony from a psychiatrist regarding Cohen's mental state. The Court of Appeals remanded the Cohen case for a possible re-trial. On June 16, 2009, Cohen pleaded guilty to aiding and assisting in the filing of a false tax return. However, Cohen died on August 6, 2009, and his case was therefore dismissed.

On February 23, 2006, Cynthia Neun, another co-defendant, was sentenced to 68 months in prison and was ordered to pay over $1.1 million in restitution. Neun's conviction was affirmed by the United States Court of Appeals for the Ninth Circuit. According to the prosecutor's office, Neun sold materials encouraging people not to pay taxes, prepared false tax returns, and represented hundreds of taxpayers in dealings with the IRS where she promoted Schiff's arguments. She was required to submit to three years of supervision following her release, which occurred on December 28, 2010.

In this last case, Schiff's attorneys again asked that the court consider the claim that Schiff had a mental disorder relating to his beliefs about taxes. According to the prosecutor's office, the evidence at trial showed that Schiff had attempted to evade the payment of over $2 million in taxes from 1979 through 1985 and that he had used offshore bank accounts using multiple tax identification numbers and had attempted to hide assets in connection with his tax protester related activity.

== Death ==
Schiff died of lung cancer in a Fort Worth hospital prison on October 16, 2015. He was 87 years old. His son Peter accused the Federal Bureau of Prisons of inhumanely treating his father by not granting him the usual humanitarian release.

== Personal life ==
Schiff's marriage to Ellen Wachsman ended in divorce in 1967. They had two sons, Peter and Andrew.

== Publications ==
Schiff's books had combined sales of more than 250,000. Books written by Schiff include the following:

- Federal Mafia: How It Illegally Imposes and Unlawfully Collects Income Taxes (1992) ISBN 0-930374-09-6
- The Great Income Tax Hoax: Why You Can Immediately Stop Paying This Illegally Enforced Tax (1985) ISBN 0-930374-05-3
- How an Economy Grows and Why It Doesn't (1985) ISBN 0-930374-06-1
- The Social Security Swindle: How Anyone Can Drop Out (1984) ISBN 0-930374-04-5
- How Anyone Can Stop Paying Income Taxes (1982) ISBN 0-930374-03-7
- The Kingdom of Moltz (1980) ISBN 0-930374-02-9
- The Biggest Con: How the Government Is Fleecing You (1977) ISBN 0-930374-01-0
- The Tax Rebel's Guide to the Constitution of the United States and the Declaration of Independence (1978) ISBN 0-930374-02-9

== See also ==
- Peter Schiff
- Tax protester history in the United States
- Tax protester constitutional arguments
- Tax protester statutory arguments
- Tax resistance

== Works cited ==
- Ladd, Karen (1997). State of New Hampshire Manual for the General Court. New Hampshire Department of State.
