= Mondial du Théâtre =

- Location: Monaco
- Founded: 1957
- Founded by: Guy et Max BROUSSE, René CELLARIO, Jean RATTI
- Editor-in-chief: Studio de Monaco
- Type of play(s): Each participating country performs in its own language
- Festival date: Last held 21–30 August 2017
- Website: http://www.mondialdutheatre.mc/mdt2017/en/index.html

The Mondial du Théâtre, also titled the International Festival of Amateur Theatre and the World Festival of Amateur Theatre is the first festival of its kind, celebrating amateur and community theatre. It is organised by the Studio de Monaco and the International Association of Amateur Theatre (IATA). It is held every four years in the Principality of Monaco since its inaugural festival in 1957.

== History ==
In 1957, Guy and Max Brousse and René Cellario, early leading figures of the International Association of Amateur Theatre, approached the Monegasque government to gain support for an International Festival around theatre. The introductory festival, termed the International Festival of Amateur Theatre, took place in Monaco and attracted twelve companies from across Europe. Over the course of that inaugural festival, the IATA held its 3rd Congress.

Both the festival and Congress were a success and the Studio de Monaco -the National Centre of the IATA-, made an undertaking to organise every four years in the Principality of Monaco, with the help of the Monegasque authorities, an International Festival around theatre, and an official Congress of the IATA. The festival helped to increase the profile of the IATA and in turn as its stature grew so did the festival’s own.

By the 1970s the number of participating theatre companies had reached twenty, with countries from outside of Europe also participating. In 1997, a record of 24 companies from all 5 continents participated, and this number has been maintained since. From that year onward, the festival adopted a new name, the "Mondial du Théâtre".

== Proceedings ==
=== “Ateliers” ===
During the festival, workshops are organized to provide amateurs actors from all over the world with a specific thematic learning experience. The workshops are presented several times over the course of the festival. Each happening of the workshops is independent of the others in order to allow more festival-goers and people the public to take part.

=== Colloques ===
The Colloques bring together the festival-goers and the 3 companies that presented their show the night before. The purpose of these meetings is have a group discussion around theatre and the companies present at the festival. The main themes are:

- The history of the company;
- Their artistic goals and aspirations;
- The company life and its organization;
- The creation process within the company;
- The cultural context in which the group operates within its country;
- The company’s relations with the National AITA/IATA Centre and internationally.

=== "Hommage"of the Festival ===
Each show is presented twice over the course of the festival, on two consecutive nights. At the end of their premiere, each company receives the Festival’s "Hommage", specially created by the Monegasque sculptor Marcel Sbirazzoli. This tradition was established in 1985.

The Trophy is distributed to all, according to the credo of the festival which is based on a friendly and impartial basis.

== Places ==
The performances take place in some of the most beautiful theatres of the Principality of Monaco:

- The Salle Garnier - (Monte-Carlo Opera)
- The Princess Grace Theatre
- The Variety Theatre
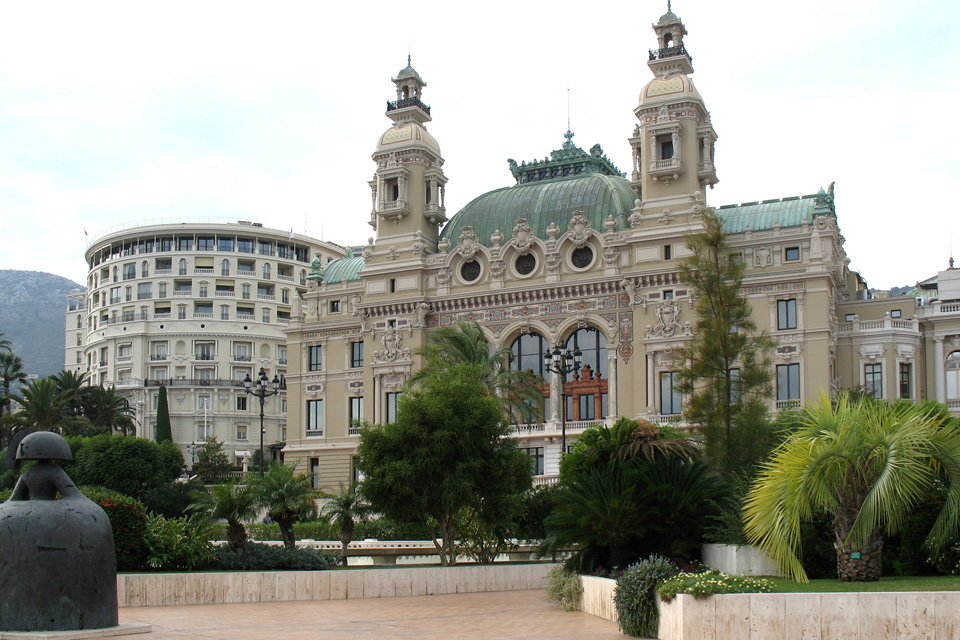
  Monte-carlo Opera
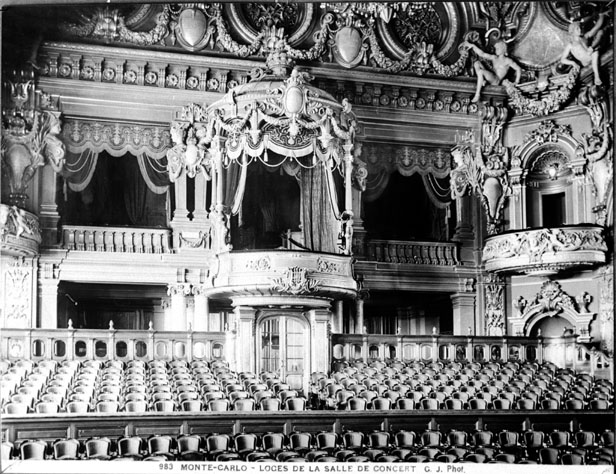
  Salle Garnier

== Economic aspects ==
The Mondial du Théâtre is largely subsidized by public entities. The particularity of the event is that it is massively financed by the Principality of Monaco for about half of its subsidies.

=== Own resources: derivative products ===
Being largely subsidized by public entities and the paid ticketing system being non-existent, the Mondial du Théâtre obtains its own resources through the sale of derivative products. They are sold in during the festival in a pop-up shop usually located at the Rainier III Auditorium in Monaco.

=== Economic and indirect impacts ===
==== Jobs and volunteer system ====
Since its creation, the Mondial du Théâtre has operated on a voluntary and free basis. Positions are distributed through section heads appointed for the event.

==== Conditions for artists to come ====
The hosting of artists has been the responsibility of the festival since 1957. Troops from all over the world are housed in hotels and apartments in the Principality and the city of Beausoleil.

==== Accommodation for spectators ====
The Mondial du Théâtre also plans accommodation for visitors, at their expense, in order to give young people and adults the opportunity to be welcomed in Monaco under such conditions that they can make the most of the performances of the festival, the cultural interest presented by the Region, the exchange of views between participants from all countries.

== Participating nations of latest edition ==
=== The 2009 festival saw the following 24 countries represented ===
- Australia - Lieder Theatre Company (Goulburn) performing The colour play
- Austria - Theater Abtenau Theater Holzhausen (Abtenau & Holzhausen) performing "My Monster" (Mein Ungeheuer) by Felix Mitterer
- Belgium - Stalteater (Oelegem) performing "Cyrano" after Edmond Rostand
- China - China Liaoning Province Art Association (Shenyang) performing Folk Arts by Kai Cui
- Congo - Marabout Theatre (Kinshasa) performing Zérocrate by Nzey van Musala
- Faroe Islands - Hudrar (Tórshavn) performing Othello after Shakespeare
- Finland - Ylioppilasteatteri (Tampere) performing Kielipuolipolitas (Dumb Show) by Neil Hardwick & Jussi Tuominen
- France - Théâtre du Torrent (Annemasse) performing Le Premier by Israel Horovitz
- Germany - Dokumentartheater (Berlin) performing Tänzerin hinter Stacheldraht (Dancer behind barbwire) by de Marina Schubarth
- Hungary - Kompania Theatre (Budakeszi) performing Roméo et Juliette after Shakespeare
- India - Akhil Bharatiya Sanskrutik Sangh (Maharashtra) performing Maharashtra Maza
- Indonesia - Satu Kata (Jakarta) performing Mission in Peace by Alika Chandra
- Ireland - Balally Players (Dublin) performing Melody by Deirdre Kinahan
- Italy - Teatro dei Picari (Macerata) performing Pulcinella by Manlio Santanelli
- Japan - Kasai & Bungeiza (Toyama) performing The butterfly wavering in the wind by Takagi Toru & Haruka Kasai
- Lithuania - Pasvalys Theatre (Pasvalys) performing Helver's Night by Ingmar Villqist
- Morocco - Atlantis (Casablanca) performing Dounya
- Peru - Maguey Teatro (Lima) performing Inticha y el Pajaro Nubero
- Slovakia - Theatre A Theatre Shanti Prievidza (Prievidza) performing A respectable wedding by Bertolt Brecht
- South Africa - Rebel Production (Johannesburg) performing Father's sons by Craig Van Zyl
- Spain - La Galerna Sosten Teatro (Gijón) performing Las Criadas (The Maids) by Jean Genet
- Great Britain - Drama Association (Inverclyde) performing Tam o' Shanter by Robert Burns
- United States - Heider Center for the Arts (West Salem, Wisconsin) performing Cotton Patch Gospel written by Clarence Jordan and Russell Treyz, original music by Harry and Tom Chapin
- Venezuela - Perras del Infierno Teatro (Caracas) performing Passport by Gustavo Ott
