= Habitat for Humanity Uganda =

Ugandan non-governmental organization

- Abbreviation: (HFHU)
- Formation: 1982
- Location: Kira Road, plot 91 -Kampala, Uganda
- Coordinates: 0°20′34″N 32°35′26″E
- Board of directors: Robert Otim

Habitat for Humanity Uganda is a non-governmental organization in Uganda that seeks to provide safe and affordable accommodation housing for vulnerable communities. It partners with volunteers, families, local communities, and other national and international partners to build homes for people.

== History ==
Habitat for Humanity Uganda was incepted in 1982 by Habitat for Humanity International which was founded in 1976 by Linda Faula with its headquarters in Geneva England. Its objective is to fight housing poverty in Uganda through policy advocacy for reforms on the deconstruction of socio-economic, infrastructural, and structural barriers to access to decent shelter for underserved and marginalized communities.

== Projects ==
Home Equals:

The project was launched in 2023 in conjunction with the Ministry of Lands, Housing, and Urban Development. It is a project with a focus on policy reforms, and support for the provision of equitable shelter to informal settlements like the Katanga slum, Kamokya, and Nsooba slums amongst some of the notorious slums found in Uganda.

Urban Low-cost house:

The project was launched at Kyasira Home Of Hope, a home for children who were affected by the Lord's Resistance Army War (LRA) in northern Uganda that occurred 20 years ago and aimed to build houses for vulnerable people. In Kumi district, 45 houses were built for people including orphaned children, people living with HIV/AIDS, widowers, and widows.

Youth Vocational training programs: It offers vocational training programs including tailoring, and garment cutting to youths in vulnerable communities enabling them to earn incomes to support themselves and their families.

== Policy Advocacy Areas ==
The organization reawakens the Ugandan government to reform and re-assess its existing policies including the Uganda National Housing Policy reform, National Land Use Policy, and National Slum Upgrading Strategy and Action Plan to benefit underserved societies and also calls upon people to save money for building decent houses instead of renting expensive houses.

They also focus research on inclusive land governance, leadership, and capacity-building programs for appropriate land use and distribution and protection of land rights.

== See also ==
- Habitat for Humanity International
- Habitat for Humanity Canada
- Habitat for Humanity Ireland
- Architecture for Humanity
