= Millard Fuller =

American lawyer and humanitarian (1935–2009)

- Born: January 3, 1935; Lanett, Alabama, United States
- Died: February 3, 2009 (aged 74) near Albany, Georgia, United States
- Education: Auburn University, University of Alabama
- Occupations: Missionary, humanitarian, founder of Habitat for Humanity International, founder of The Fuller Center for Housing
- Spouse: Linda Caldwell (m. 1959)

Millard Dean Fuller (January 3, 1935 – February 3, 2009) was an American humanitarian and missionary who was the co-founder and the former president of Habitat for Humanity International, a nonprofit organization known globally for building houses for those in need. Fuller also was the founder and president of The Fuller Center for Housing. Fuller was widely regarded as the leader of the modern-day movement for affordable housing and had been honored for his work in the United States and abroad.

== Personal life ==
Fuller was born in Lanett, Alabama, on January 3, 1935, to Render and Estin Cook Fuller. Render was employed by Lanett Bleachery and Dye Works and Estin was a homemaker. Estin died in 1938 at age 27 and Render was remarried in 1941 to Eunice Stephens. Render became self-employed with a small grocery store, ice cream shop and cattle farming. Fuller had two half-brothers by stepmother Eunice, Nick and Doyle. Nick died in 2006.

Fuller majored in economics at Auburn University in 1957 and received a law degree from the University of Alabama in 1960. He married Linda Caldwell of Tuscaloosa, Alabama, in 1959. A successful businessman and lawyer, Fuller became a self-made millionaire by age 29. In 1968, after giving up their wealth to refocus their lives on Christian service, Fuller and his wife, Linda, moved with their children to an interracial farming community in southwest Georgia. Koinonia Farm, founded by Clarence Jordan in 1942, became home to the Fuller family for five years until they moved to Zaire (now the Democratic Republic of the Congo) as missionaries in 1973 with the Christian Church (Disciples of Christ).

Upon returning to the United States, the Fullers began a Christian ministry at Koinonia Farm building simple, decent houses for low-income families in their community using volunteer labor and donations, and requiring repayment only of the cost of the materials used. No interest was charged, as it is with traditional mortgages, and no profit was made. These same principles guided the Fullers in expanding this ministry, called Partnership Housing, into a larger scale ministry known as Habitat for Humanity International. That vision was expanded in 2005 in the founding of a new non-profit housing organization, The Fuller Center for Housing.

Fuller faced multiple allegations of inappropriate and unwanted sexual behavior toward female employees. In 2004, a former staff member accused him of making suggestive comments and physically touching her during a car ride to the Atlanta airport in 2003. Fuller denied the former staff member's claim. These accusations were not isolated and also included accusations of retaliation towards individuals who spoke up about Fuller's behavior. An internal investigation by Habitat for Humanity’s board ultimately found “insufficient proof of inappropriate conduct” in the 2004 case.

Fuller died unexpectedly on February 3, 2009, while en route to the hospital in nearby Albany, Georgia, aged 74. Fuller had a simple burial and is buried on the grounds of Koinonia Farm.

== The housing movement ==
=== Koinonia Farm ===
In 1965, the Fuller family stopped to visit friends at Koinonia Farm on a road trip from New York City; after spending several hours with the intentional community's founder, Clarence Jordan, Millard and Linda decided to stay and began a relationship with Jordan that ultimately led to the creation of Habitat for Humanity.

Jordan espoused an expression of Christianity which motivated him and the Fullers to seek ways to express God's love to their poorer neighbors. Koinonia Farm became Koinonia Partners in 1968 as the small community undertook several new projects, the primary focus of which was Partnership Housing. Believing that what the poor needed was capital, not charity, Jordan and Millard Fuller, along with other members of the Koinonia community, planned to develop a revolving "Fund for Humanity" which would take in donations that would be used to purchase building materials. Volunteer laborers would construct simple, decent houses along with the families who would eventually own the houses. The homeowners would then repay the cost of the materials to the Fund for Humanity at 0% interest; in this way, the work was not a give-away program, and the funds repaid were then used to begin work on additional houses.

=== Zaire ===
Fuller moved his family to Zaire (currently called the Democratic Republic of the Congo), in 1973, to implement the ideals of Partnership Housing in the African context. Again, as missionaries of the Christian Church (Disciples of Christ), the Fullers began work in Mbandaka, a city of extreme poverty in the western part of the country. Among other projects, Fuller developed and oversaw what would be the first step in the international housing ministry. Undeveloped land in the center of Mbandaka was given by the government for the purpose of building a 100-house development. The units were constructed and sold to families using the Fund for Humanity and additional projects were planned before the Fullers returned to the United States in 1976.

=== Habitat for Humanity ===
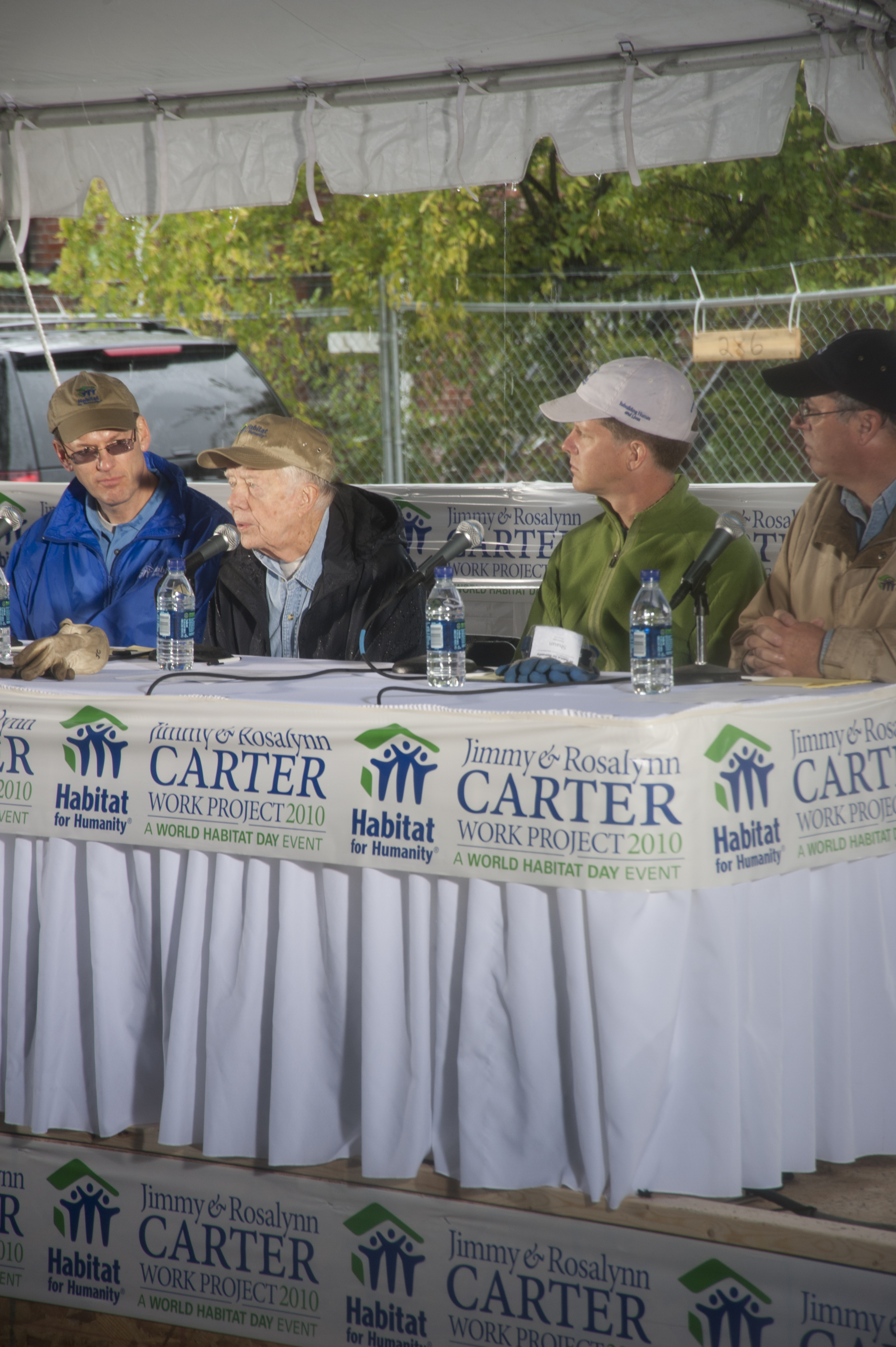
President Jimmy Carter speaking at the 27th annual Jimmy & Rosalynn Carter Work Project event on World Habitat Day.

The possibility of utilizing the Fund for Humanity to address housing needs in the United States on a broader scale began in San Antonio, Texas, in 1976. Concerned residents worked with Fuller to develop a program similar to that in Zaire, using volunteer labor to construct affordable, safe houses for needy families in San Antonio's slums. Soon the idea took hold in Appalachia, and by 1981, just five years from its inception, Habitat for Humanity had affiliates in fourteen states and seven foreign countries.

In early 1984, Millard courted the man who would become Habitat's most famous volunteer, President Jimmy Carter. A native of Plains, Georgia, just a few miles from Habitat's headquarters in Americus, Georgia, Carter gave not only his name and reputation to the new non-profit, but his own resources as well. Jimmy and Rosalynn Carter would make financial contributions regularly, but most significantly to Habitat, they would develop the Jimmy Carter Work Project, an annual week-long effort of building Habitat homes all over the world. The Carters participated all week at these events which came to attract thousands of volunteers each year.

The Carters' involvement with Habitat for Humanity propelled the organization to even faster growth. By 2003, Habitat affiliates worldwide had built over 150,000 homes and were active in 92 nations.

Disputes between Fuller and the Habitat International board of directors regarding the direction of the organization came to a head in 2004. He and Linda were fired in March 2005 amid allegations of inappropriate behavior by him directed toward a female employee and conflicting opinions about future plans for Habitat's expansion. Sexual abuse allegations had been made by numerous women in the 1990s and 2000s. In the 1990s, Fuller was reprimanded by the Habitat Board of Directors after several women came forward. Those complaints were settled internally, but Fuller was warned. When a subsequent new allegation was made about an incident in 2003, Fuller was forced to resign.

John Wieland, a Georgia developer who has built 26 houses for Habitat for Humanity and donated more than $500,000 to the organization, who was on the board in 1990-91, said this: "Our conclusion was that Millard was a hugger and was misinterpreted, and some people went out of their way to make something big out of something that wasn't really that big".

Fuller continued his work in the housing movement with the establishment of The Fuller Center for Housing in April 2005. He expanded on the foundation of Habitat by encouraging communities to create "collaborative and innovative partnerships" to address the housing needs of the most needy in communities. He continued to travel extensively, speaking at Habitat affiliates and Fuller Center Covenant Partnerships to raise awareness, funds and volunteers in his effort to eradicate poverty housing from the face of the earth.

== Recognition ==
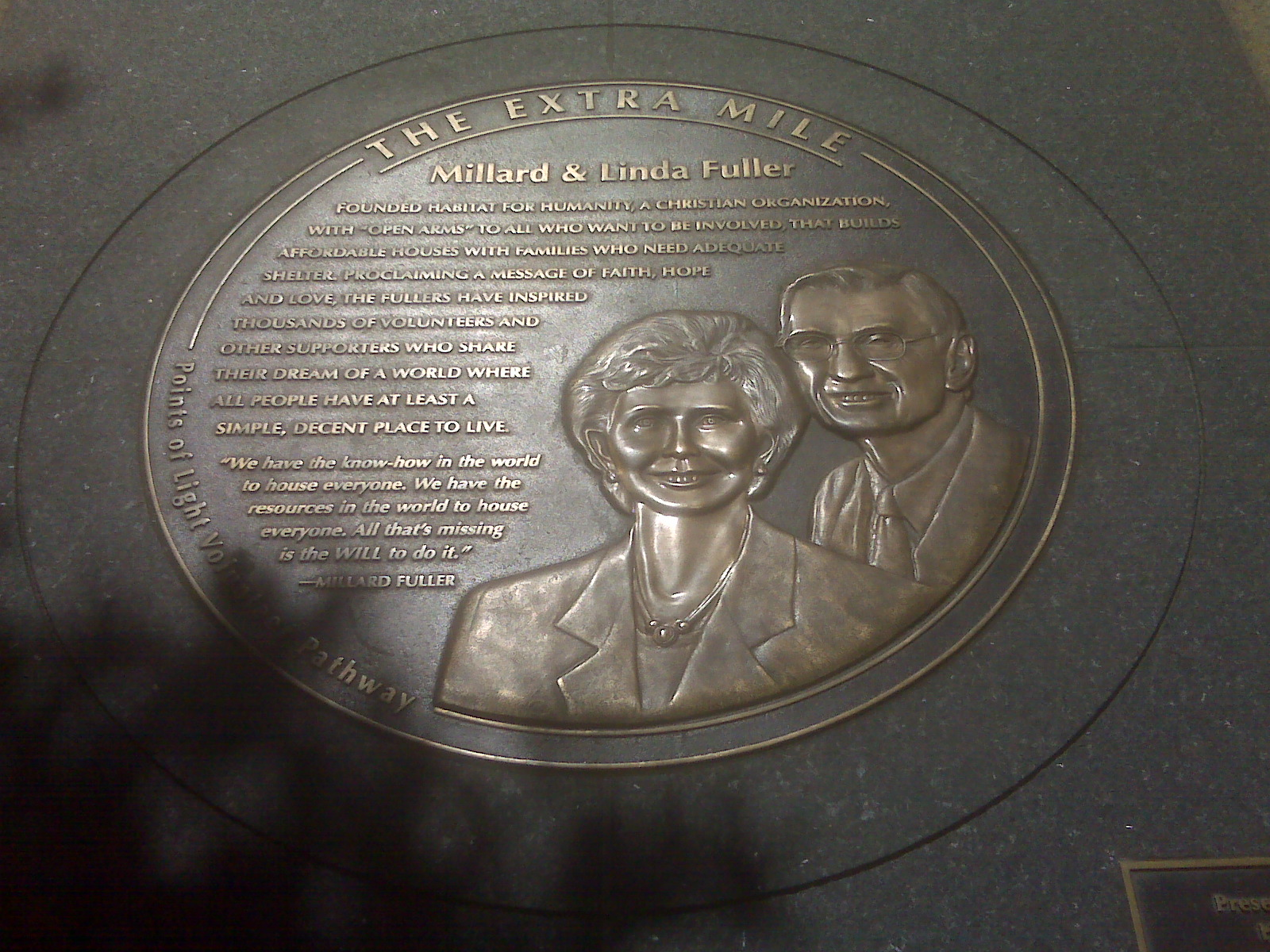
Millard and Linda Fuller honoree medallion located on The Extra Mile memorial beginning at the corner of Pennsylvania Avenue and 15th Street, NW and continues north on 15th Street to G Street, NW. There, it turns east on G Street for two blocks to its intersection with 13th Street, in Washington, DC.

Fuller was the recipient of numerous awards and more than 50 honorary degrees. In September 1996, United States President Bill Clinton awarded him the Presidential Medal of Freedom, the nation's highest civilian honor, and said, "Millard Fuller has done as much to make the dream of homeownership a reality in our country and throughout the world as any living person. I don't think it's an exaggeration to say that Millard Fuller has literally revolutionized the concept of philanthropy."

In 1998, Fuller received the Golden Plate Award of the American Academy of Achievement. In 1999, Fuller received the Award for Greatest Public Service Benefiting the Disadvantaged, an award given out annually by Jefferson Awards. In October 2005, the Fullers were honored by former President George H. W. Bush and the Points of Light Foundation with a bronze medallion embedded in The Extra Mile national monument in Washington, DC.

== Bibliography ==
- Building Materials for Life, Volume III (Smyth & Helwys Publishing, Inc., 2007). ISBN 978-1-57312-486-7.
- Building Materials for Life, Volume II (Smyth & Helwys Publishing, Inc., 2004). ISBN 978-1-57312-420-1.
- Building Materials for Life, Volume I (Smyth & Helwys Publishing, Inc., 2002). ISBN 978-1-57312-404-1.
- More Than Houses: How Habitat for Humanity Is Transforming Lives and Neighborhoods (Word, Inc., 2000). ISBN 0-8499-3762-0.
- A Simple, Decent Place to Live: The Building Realization of Habitat for Humanity (Word, Inc., 1995). ISBN 978-0-8499-3889-4.
- The Theology of the Hammer (Smyth & Helwys Publishing, Inc., 1994). ISBN 978-1-880837-92-4.
- The Excitement Is Building (Word Publishing, 1990). ISBN 978-0-8499-0747-0. Co-authored with Linda Fuller.
- No More Shacks!: The Daring Vision of Habitat for Humanity (Word Publishing, 1986). ISBN 978-0-8499-3050-8. Co-authored with Diane Scott.
- Love in the Mortar Joints (New Century Publishers, Inc., 1980). ISBN 978-0-695-81444-1.
- Bokotola (New Century Publishers, Inc., 1977). ISBN 978-0-8096-1924-5.
