= Koinonia Partners =

Christian farming community in Georgia, US

Koinonia Farm is a Christian farming intentional community founded in 1942 in Sumter County, Georgia, US.

== History ==
The farm was founded in 1942 by two couples, Clarence and Florence Jordan and Martin and Mabel England, as a "demonstration plot for the Kingdom of God." For them, this meant following the example of the first Christian communities as described in the Acts of the Apostles, amid the poverty and racism of the rural South. The name Koinonia is an ancient Greek word, used often in the New Testament, meaning deep fellowship. Koinonia members divested themselves of personal wealth and joined a "common purse" economic system. They envisioned an interracial community where blacks and whites could live and work together in a spirit of partnership.

Based on their interpretation of the New Testament, Koinonia members committed to the following precepts:

1. Treat all human beings with dignity and justice
2. Choose love over violence
3. Share all possessions and live simply
4. Be stewards of the land and its natural resources

Other families joined, and visitors came to "serve a period of apprenticeship in developing community life on the teachings and principles of Jesus." Koinonians, visitors, and neighbors farmed, worshipped and ate together, attended Bible studies and held summer youth camps. When resources allowed the hiring of seasonal help, black and white workers were paid equally. Additional spiritual stewards of the community in the earlier years included Conrad (Con) Browne and Will Wittkamper.

=== During the Civil Rights Movement ===
These practices were a break with the prevailing culture of Jim Crow-era Georgia, and were challenged by many citizens of Sumter County, most intensely during the 1950s, and with diminishing intensity for years thereafter. A boycott of the farm occurred during the mid-1950s. The local Chamber of Commerce met with the Full Members of The Farm to request that Koinonia sell its property and disband. The 1950s also saw acts of terrorism such as dynamiting Koinonia's roadside produce stand, firing shots into the compound, and threatening phone calls and letters. The local Ku Klux Klan drove a 70+ car motorcade to the farm as an act of intimidation. Koinonia members discerned that their religious views called them to bear these acts nonviolently; members responded by writing editorials to the local newspaper clarifying the farm's position, maintaining an unarmed watch at the entrance to the community during the nights, and other acts of nonviolent witness.

As a way to survive in hostile surroundings, Koinonia members created a small mail-order catalog to sell their farm's pecans and peanuts around the world. The business's first slogan was "Help us ship the nuts out of Georgia!" The business evolved to include treats made in the farm's bakery. The Koinonia Catalog business continued after the boycott concluded, and still constitutes the largest source of earned income for Koinonia.

=== Habitat for Humanity International ===
Threats of physical violence dwindled in the late 1960s, but the population of Koinonia Farm was greatly diminished due to the stress of previous years. Koinonia members searched for a new focus, and considered closing the farm experiment if none were found.

Millard and Linda Fuller had spent a month at Koinonia several years earlier. Millard had been an extremely successful businessman before he and his wife Linda rededicated their lives to Christianity, divested of their wealth, and sought ways to live out their faith. Clarence Jordan, Millard Fuller, and other allies of Koinonia engaged in a series of meetings, out of which emerged a new direction for Koinonia.

Changing its name from Koinonia Farm to Koinonia Partners, the community refocused itself as a social service organization. The organization initiated several programs in partnership with its neighbors, chief among them Koinonia Partnership Housing, which organized the construction of affordable houses for low-income neighboring families previously living in shacks and dilapidated residences. Using volunteer labor and monetary donations, Koinonia built 194 homes from 1969 to 1992, which families bought with 20-year, no-interest mortgages. Mortgage payments were placed in a revolving Fund for Humanity. Payments into this fund were used to finance the construction of more houses. Of the houses built, 62 houses sit on Koinonia's property, forming two neighborhoods that surround the central community area; the remaining houses are located in the towns of Americus and Plains, all within Sumter County.

The Fullers guided the first four years of Koinonia Partnership Housing, and then moved to Zaire (now Democratic Republic of Congo) for three years to establish a similar program there. In 1976, they returned to Americus and founded the non-profit organization Habitat for Humanity International. Modeled after the Koinonia Partnership Housing program, this organization builds houses with families in need, then sells the houses to the families at no profit and no interest. Habitat for Humanity volunteers and homeowners have built more than 500,000 houses in more than 100 countries.

=== Clarence Jordan's works while at Koinonia ===
Founding member Clarence Jordan held an undergraduate degree in agriculture from the University of Georgia and wanted to use his knowledge of scientific farming "to seek to conserve the soil, God's holy earth" and to assist Koinonia's neighbors, most of whom were African-American sharecroppers and tenant farmers. Jordan and fellow founding member Martin England were ordained ministers and professors. Jordan held a doctorate in New Testament Greek. Part of their vision for Koinonia was to offer training to African-American ministers living in the area. For the first few years of the Koinonia experiment, Jordan in particular was welcomed to preach and teach in local churches. Though the demands of farming in those early years did not allow time for formal training of others, Jordan used these visits to both black and white churches to offer guidance.

In addition to his work on the farm, Jordan penned many works of theology in his writing shack, a small one-room structure set near the "Bottom Garden", now in one of the farm's pecan orchards. Among the works penned there were four volumes collectively known as the Cotton Patch Version. These four volumes were a collective work blending Clarence's translations of the New Testament Gospels from the original Greek into the Georgia vernacular and discussions of the full membership of Koinonia on the translations and meanings. He also prepared for his nationwide speaking engagements there. Jordan's writing and speaking engagements brought the existence of Koinonia Farm (and later Koinonia Partners) to the awareness of many Christians, theologians, students, and others. Jordan's Cotton Patch Version of Matthew and John was the inspiration for a musical theater work by Harry Chapin, The Cotton Patch Gospel.

=== Ministries and structure since 1969 ===
On October 29, 1969, Clarence Jordan died of a heart attack at age 57, while working on a sermon in his writing shack. After Jordan's death, other community members carried on the work of Koinonia. This work included the founding of other organizations such as Jubilee Partners in Comer, Georgia (a community that welcomes refugees from war-torn countries), New Hope House in Griffin, Georgia (assisting families with loved ones on death row, as well as advocating the abolition of the death penalty), The Prison & Jail Project in Americus, Georgia (an anti-racist, grassroots organization which monitors courtrooms, prisons and jails in southwest Georgia), and The Fuller Center for Housing (the second organization founded by Millard and Linda Fuller, also pursuing affordable housing solutions for impoverished families worldwide).

Koinonia members and ministries since 1969 include civil rights work, prison ministry, racial reconciliation, peace activism, early childhood education, youth and teen outreach, affordable housing, language training, sustainable agriculture, economic development, home repair, elder programs, and more. Current ministries include affordable home repair for neighbors, an elder program, a summer youth camp, welcoming visitors and guests in hospitality, and educating the public about Koinonia history and legacy.

In 1993, Koinonia abandoned its "common purse" and experimented with a corporate non-profit structure. During this period the organization was known as Koinonia Partners, Inc. A board of directors and staff and volunteer positions were established to govern and operate the community, in place of the former community-based structure. This corporate structure was not suitable financially for the community. In 2005, Koinonia again reorganized, ending the distinction between staff and volunteers and committing once more to the intentional Christian community model. The common purse has not been readopted; rather, each member receives an allowance based upon his or her needs, family and responsibilities.

The community, again known by its original name, Koinonia Farm, was designated a Georgia Historic Site in 2005. In 2008, the Koinonia community received the Community of Christ International Peace Award.

== See also ==
- Morgan Farm (Sumter County, Georgia), historic African American farmstead nearby
