= The Fuller Center for Housing =

Nonprofit organization

The Fuller Center for Housing (FCH) is an ecumenical Christian, 501(c)(3) non-profit, non-governmental organization based in Americus, Georgia, that builds and repairs homes for low-income families and individuals. It is active in 60 U.S. cities and 16 countries outside the U.S.

== History ==
The Fuller Center was started in 2005 by Presidential Medal of Freedom recipient Millard Fuller and his wife Linda Caldwell Fuller, founders of Habitat for Humanity, at an intentional Christian community called Koinonia Farm in rural southwest Georgia. After spending 29 years of service in the Christian housing ministry at Habitat, and being fired for philosophical differences by the Habitat for Humanity executive committee, the Fullers were motivated to continue expanding their vision of eliminating substandard housing worldwide. The inaugural meeting of The Fuller Center at Koinonia, also Habitat's birthplace, established this new mission: "The Fuller Center for Housing, faith- driven and Christ-centered, promotes collaborative and innovative partnerships with individuals and organizations in an unrelenting quest to provide adequate shelter for all people in need worldwide."
