= Habitat for Humanity Canada =

Nonprofit organisation

- Habitat pour l'humanité Canada
- Founded: Winnipeg (1985)
- Type: Non-profit, Interest group
- Location: Administrative headquarters in Toronto, Ontario
- Services: Supporting affordable homeownership through home construction, home repairs, financing programs and advocacy on housing policy
- Fields: Affordable housing
- Key people: Pedro Barata (President & CEO)
- Parent organization: Habitat for Humanity International
- Website: www.habitat.ca

Habitat for Humanity Canada (also known as Habitat Canada; French: Habitat pour l'humanité Canada) is a national charitable housing organization. Founded in 1985, it is a member of Habitat for Humanity International, a global housing organization working in more than 60 countries.

Habitat Canada works with 44 local Habitat organizations across Canada, including in every province and the North. Its activities include home construction, repair, and financing, skills training and advocacy.

Habitat's first Canadian build took place in Winkler, Manitoba. Two years later, Winnipeg became the first local Habitat in Canada.

Since its founding, Habitat Canada has partnered with close to 5,000 families from coast to coast to coast, helping them to achieve the benefits of affordable homeownership. As a part of a global federation, Habitat Canada also directly supports international housing solutions in countries beyond its borders.

== History ==
Habitat for Humanity Canada was founded in 1985, with the inaugural meeting and first home built in Winkler, Manitoba. This marked the first national Habitat organization to be established outside of the United States. That house would go to Ernie and Gloria Penner, who qualified as Habitat for Humanity’s first home recipients in Canada after a six-month application process. Before Habitat, Ernie and Gloria were raising their children in a two-bedroom apartment in Winkler, and homeownership seemed beyond their reach. Ernie and Gloria would go on to donate over 1,000 hours of labour into building other Habitat homes.

On June 22, 1987, Winnipeg became home to the first local Habitat in Canada, Habitat for Humanity Winnipeg (later renamed Habitat for Humanity Manitoba). In early 1988, the Habitat for Humanity Canada national office was established in Waterloo, Ontario.

In April 1991, the world’s first Habitat for Humanity ReStore was opened by Habitat for Humanity in Winnipeg. It operated in a small building located at Palliser Furniture, and mostly sold used lumber in its nascent years. As of 2026, more than 100 Habitat ReStores operate in Canada. All profits from Habitat ReStore help to fund more homes for families in need of safe and affordable housing.

== Prairies and Pacific ==
=== Manitoba ===
Habitat for Humanity Manitoba
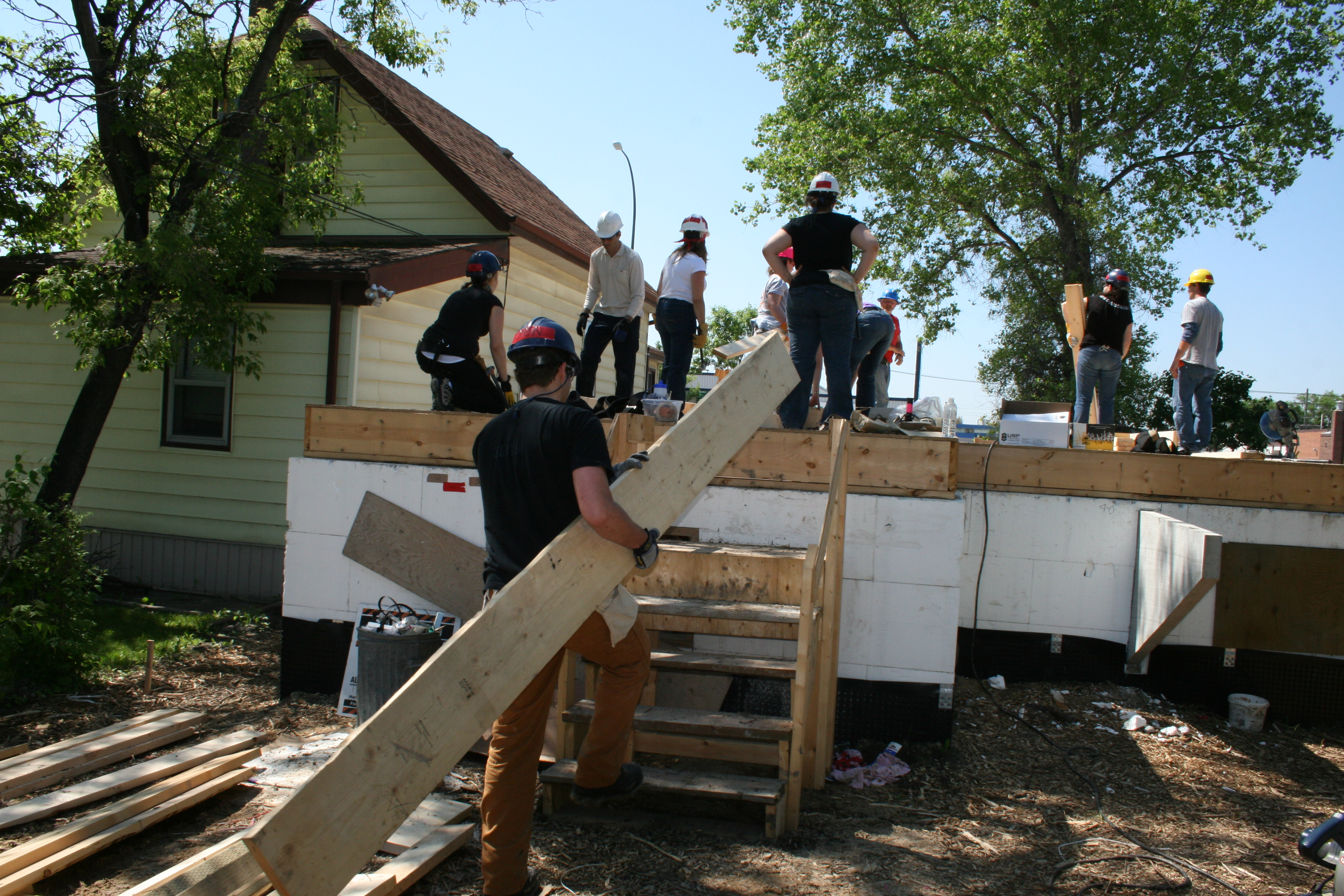
- National Leasing employees volunteering at the Habitat For Humanity Winnipeg build.
- Formation: June 22, 1987; 39 years ago
- Headquarters: 60 Archibald St., Winnipeg, MB R2J 0V8
- Website: habitat.mb.ca
- Formerly called: Habitat for Humanity Winnipeg

Habitat for Humanity Canada was founded and built its first ever home in Winkler, Manitoba, in 1985.

On June 22, 1987, Winnipeg became home to the first local Habitat for Humanity in Canada, as Habitat for Humanity Winnipeg.

Four years later, in 1991, the world’s first ReStore was opened by Habitat for Humanity in Winnipeg, with the help of five volunteers.

In 1993, Winnipeg, along with Waterloo, Ontario, hosted the first international Jimmy & Rosalynn Carter Work Project in Canada. Planning for this event began in 1991, when Winnipeg was formally invited to host. In 1992, former U.S. President Jimmy Carter personally asked Winnipeg Mayor Bill Norrie to create the Winnipeg Habitat Foundation, an advisory group of corporate and community leaders overseeing the project. 1993 marked Jimmy and Rosalynn Carter's very first time venturing outside of the United States on behalf of Habitat for Humanity International.

In 2012, Habitat for Humanity Winnipeg was renamed to Habitat for Humanity Manitoba.

=== Alberta ===
There are five Habitat for Humanity affiliates in Alberta:

- Habitat for Humanity Camrose, based in Camrose
- Habitat for Humanity Edmonton, based in Edmonton and serving communities in northern Alberta since 1991.
- Habitat for Humanity Lethbridge, based in Lethbridge and serving the area since at least 2011.
- Habitat for Humanity Red Deer, based in Red Deer County and serving Central Alberta since 1994.
- Habitat for Humanity Southern Alberta, based in Calgary and serving Southern Alberta since 1990.

=== British Columbia ===
There are seven Habitat for Humanity affiliates in British Columbia:

- Habitat for Humanity Greater Vancouver, based in Burnaby, has served the Squamish and Greater Vancouver region since 1995.
- Habitat for Humanity Mid-Vancouver Island (formerly Humanity Nanaimo until 2007), based in Nanaimo, has served the central Vancouver Island area since 1994.
- Habitat for Humanity Okanagan, based in West Kelowna, has served the Okanagan region from Armstrong to Osoyoos since 1992.
- Habitat for Humanity Southeast BC, based in Castlegar and serving the Boundary and Kootenays region of BC from Rock Creek to the Alberta border, and from Golden to the U.S. border.
  - Habitat for Humanity SEBC was formerly Habitat for Humanity Boundary and Habitat for Humanity West Kootenay, which merged in March 2014. Habitat for Humanity has served the Southeast BC region since 1999.
- Habitat for Humanity Sunshine Coast, based in Sechelt, has served the Sunshine Coast since 2004.
  - Sunshine Coast was the smallest community to have a Habitat chapter when it was formed.
- Habitat for Humanity Vancouver Island North, based in Courtenay, has served the northern Vancouver Island area from Bowser to Port Hardy since 2004.
- Habitat for Humanity Victoria, based in Victoria, has served the Victoria Capital Region since in 1990.

=== Saskatchewan ===
Habitat for Humanity Saskatchewan is based in Regina.

Habitat Saskatchewan also has four chapters, run in rural communities outside of Regina, Saskatoon, and Prince Albert:

- Habitat Estevan
- Habitat Yorkton
- Habitat Moose Jaw
- Habitat Melfort

Canada’s 100th Habitat for Humanity home was built in Saskatoon in 1993.

== Central Canada ==
=== Ontario ===
In early 1988, the Habitat for Humanity Canada national office was established in Waterloo, Ontario. In 1993, Waterloo, along with Winnipeg, Manitoba, hosted the first international Jimmy & Rosalynn Carter Work Project in Canada.

There are 23 Habitat for Humanity affiliates in Ontario:

Affiliate name	Based in	Service regions
Chatham-Kent	Chatham	Chatham-Kent
Cornwall & the Counties	Cornwall	
Greater Ottawa	Ottawa	Greater Ottawa
Habitat for Humanity GTA	Toronto	Toronto, Brampton, Caledon, Durham Region, York Region
Grey Bruce	Owen Sound	Bruce—Grey—Owen Sound
Guelph Wellington	Guelph	Guelph, Wellington
Halton-Mississauga-Dufferin	Burlington	Halton, Mississauga, Dufferin
Hamilton	Hamilton	Hamilton, Halidmand County, Six Nations of the Grand River, Mississaugas of the Credit First Nation
Heartland Ontario	London	Brant, Elgin, Middlesex, Norfolk, Oxford and Perth Counties
Huron County	Goderich	Huron County
Huronia	Barrie	Huronia, South Georgian Bay region
Kingston Limestone Region	Kingston	Kingston region
Niagara	St. Catharines	Niagara
Northumberland	Cobourg	Northumberland
Ontario Gateway North	Bracebridge	Cochrane, Greater Sudbury, Muskoka, North Bay, North Simcoe County, Perry Sound
Peterborough & Kawartha Region	Peterborough	Peterborough—Kawartha
Prince Edward-Hastings	Belleville	Prince Edward—Hastings
Sarnia/Lambton	Sarnia	Sarnia—Lambton
Sault Ste. Marie & Area	Sault Ste. Marie	Sault Ste. Marie region
Thousand Islands	Brockville	Leeds and Grenville
Thunder Bay	Thunder Bay	
Waterloo Region	Waterloo	Regional Municipality of Waterloo
Windsor-Essex	Windsor	Windsor, Essex

==== Toronto and GTA ====
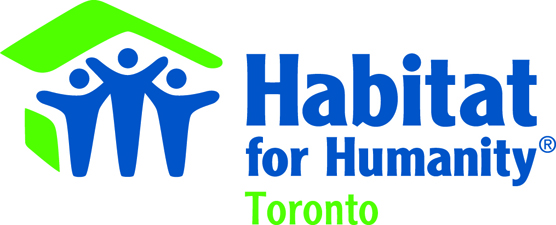
Habitat for Humanity Toronto logo

Habitat Greater Toronto Area (GTA) was established in 2014 upon the merging of Habitat Toronto, Habitat Brampton, and Habitat York, focused on building homes throughout the Greater Toronto Area.

Habitat for Humanity Toronto was established in 1988, being a local grassroots organization from its founding to 2001.

Each year, Habitat Toronto holds a "blitz build" that targets a specific group and tries to get a large portion of that group out to build. In 2009, the organization held a Women Build event where 300 female volunteers helped build 16 homes in Scarborough.

In 2009, Habitat Toronto CEO Neil Hetherington was named as one of the Top 40 under 40 by The Caldwell Partners International.

Since 1988, Habitat GTA has built 26 communities across Toronto, Brampton, Caledon, Durham Region and York Region, partnering with more than 650 families.

==== Habitat for Humanity Heartland Ontario ====
Habitat for Humanity Heartland Ontario
- Formation: 1993; 33 years ago
- Headquarters: London, Ontario
- Board Chair: Steven Roorda
- Formerly called: HFH London (1993-2012); HFH Oxford Middlesex Elgin (2012-2014)

It is based in London, serves the eastern portion of Southwestern Ontario, namely Brant, Elgin, Middlesex, Norfolk, Oxford, and Perth County.

Habitat Heartland Ontario was established in 1993 as Habitat for Humanity London, renamed to Habitat for Humanity Oxford Middlesex Elgin in 2012 after expanding into those counties, and finally becoming Habitat for Humanity Heartland Ontario upon its acquisition of the Stratford Perth affiliate in 2014. In 2021, the organization would also expand into Brant-Norfolk.

As of January 2021, Heartland merged with Habitat for Humanity Brant-Norfolk, adding another 2 already established stores to their network located in Brantford and Simcoe respectively.

=== Quebec ===
Habitat for Humanity Quebec (French: Habitat pour l'humanité Québec) was founded in January 1998 as Habitat for Humanity Montréal in Montreal, marking Habitat's presence in all 10 provinces of Canada. Stephen Rotman became president of Habitat for Humanity Montreal on August 21, 1998.

The first build project was dedicated on October 31, 1999, in the Saint-Henri district of Montreal. The project consisted of building two adjacent houses to provide homes for two families. Habitat Montreal built its 3rd house in 2002.

The McGill University Campus Chapter of Habitat Quebec, formed in February 1998.

On October 17, 2006, Montreal's ReStore was opened at 7177 Newman Boulevard in LaSalle, becoming the 50th ReStore opened in Canada and the 1st in the province of Quebec. Initially, unlike the ReStore stores in the rest of Canada, the Montreal outlet did not accept donations from the general public. "We want to sell quality goods to people, so, for now, we're relying on corporate donations," Rotman explained for The Gazette.

Also that month, Habitat Montreal had built three homes. "It costs about $75,000 to build a house, plus all the donated labour and materials," Rotman said. Rotman was optimistic that the new ReStore will generate "a couple of hundred thousand dollars a year" allowing the local Habitat group to step up the pace of construction to two houses a year.

On May 15, 2007, a new house building project was unveiled, which provide a home for a family in the Mercier–Hochelaga-Maisonneuve borough of East-end Montreal.

In August 2010, for a fourth consecutive year, TD participated in a Habitat for Humanity Montreal project by donating $10,000. On August 11 and 12, approximately 30 TD employees helped build a duplex on 5096-5098, Sainte-Clotilde in Saint-Henri district.

In November 2010, Isabel St Germain Singh became CEO of Habitat for Humanity Montreal.

Charles Lafortune was named as its new spokesperson, in a ceremony held at ReStore, on July 7, 2011.

On November 15, 2011, two renovations projects in the borough of Mercier–Hochelaga-Maisonneuve began.

Habitat Montreal organized the first annual fundraising gala on May 17, 2012, at the Montreal Delta Centre-Ville. The second fundraising gala was organized at Windsor Hotel (Montreal) on May 1, 2014.

== Atlantic Canada ==
- Habitat for Humanity Prince Edward Island, based in Charlottetown, was founded in 1996. Habitat PEI had built 35 houses from 2001 to 2011 in the province, but never west of Summerside at the time.
- Habitat for Humanity Newfoundland and Labrador, based in St. John's, was incorporated in May 1994. In 2012, Habitat Newfoundland sent its first Global Village Team to Thailand.

=== New Brunswick ===
Habitats for Humanity Fredericton, Moncton and Saint John officially amalgamated on April 1, 2023 to form a single provincial organization known as Habitat for Humanity New Brunswick. Habitat New Brunswick serves communities across the province.

In 1996, Canada’s 200th Habitat for Humanity home was built in Moncton.

=== Nova Scotia ===
Habitat reached Nova Scotia in 1992 with the establishment of Habitat for Humanity Halifax-Dartmouth in Dartmouth.

In 2003, a chapter was established on the South Shore, which dedicated its first home in Bridgewater in 2006. Also in 2006, the affiliate opened a ReStore in the Burnside neighbourhood.

Habitat Halifax-Dartmouth hosted its first Women Build in 2007. Habitat HRM dedicated its 25th home in Sackville in 2008.

In 2011, the organization became Habitat for Humanity Nova Scotia, a provincial affiliate of Habitat for Humanity Canada.

== Northern Canada ==
Construction of the first Habitat for Humanity homes in the Northwest Territories began in June 2014.

=== Yukon ===
Habitat for Humanity Yukon was given official affiliate status in September 2004, with Todd Hardy as a founding member and the first President.

The first projects of Habitat for Humanity Yukon were homes at the following Whitehorse, Yukon, locations: Kodiak Place (1 unit, completed November 2006); Keewenaw Drive (2 units, completed July 2010); Wheeler Street (3 units, completed February 2011), and Pintail Place (3 units, completed February 2013).
