= Habitat for Humanity =

American nonprofit organization devoted to building affordable housing

Habitat for Humanity International

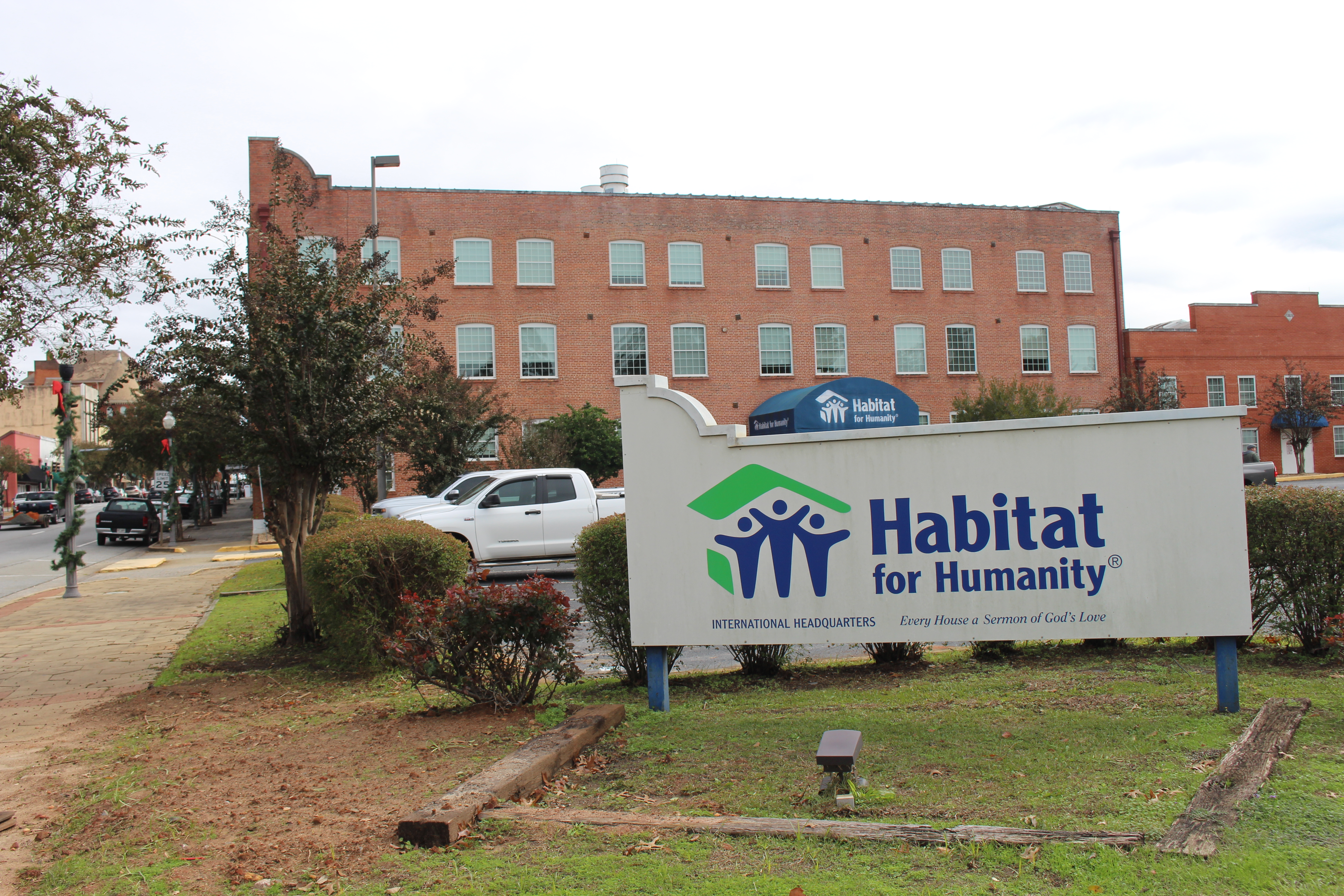
- International Headquarters in Georgia in 2019
- Founded: 1976; 50 years ago Americus, Georgia, U.S.
- Founders: Millard Fuller; Linda Fuller
- Type: Non-profit, interest group, Christian
- Locations: Atlanta, Georgia, U.S. (Administrative headquarters); Americus, Georgia, U.S. (Global/international headquarters)
- Services: "Building simple, decent and affordable housing"
- Fields: Protecting human rights
- Key people: Jonathan Reckford, CEO
- Website: www.habitat.org

Habitat for Humanity International (HFHI), generally referred to as Habitat for Humanity or Habitat, is an American 501(c)(3) Christian nonprofit organization which seeks to build affordable housing. It is headquartered in Americus, Georgia, United States. As of 2023, Habitat for Humanity operates in more than 70 countries.

Habitat for Humanity works to help build and improve homes for families of low-income or disadvantaged backgrounds. Homes are built using volunteer labor, including that of Habitat homeowners through the practice of sweat equity, as well as paid contractors for certain construction or infrastructure activities as needed. Habitat makes no profit from the sales.

The organization operates with financial support from individuals, philanthropic foundations, corporations, government support, and mass media companies.

== History ==
Habitat for Humanity traces its roots to the establishment of the Humanity Fund by attorney Millard Fuller, his wife Linda, and Baptist theologian and farmer Clarence Jordan in 1968 at Koinonia Farm, an intercultural Christian intentional community farming community in Sumter County, Georgia, United States. With the funds, 42 homes were built at Koinonia for families in need.

In 1973, the Fullers decided to try the concept at a Christian Church (Disciples of Christ) mission in Mbandaka, Democratic Republic of Congo. After three successful years, the Fullers returned to the United States and founded Habitat for Humanity in 1976.

In 2022, in Tempe, Arizona, Habitat for Humanity 3D-printed walls for a house when not enough labor was available.

In March 2025, the Federal Bureau of Investigation under President Donald Trump froze the group's bank accounts while it investigated them for "possible criminal violations" as part of the administration's broader efforts to criminalize research into climate change. According to the FBI, the violations included the reception of a climate related grant from the United States Environmental Protection Agency under President Biden, with all recipients being treated as having committed fraud and conspiracy to defraud the United States.

== Ongoing programs ==
=== A Brush With Kindness ===
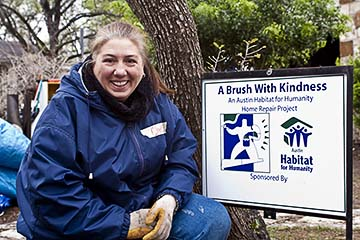
A Brush With Kindness home repair project

Habitat for Humanity's A Brush With Kindness is a locally operated program serving low-income homeowners who struggle to maintain the exterior of their homes. The program is a holistic approach to providing affordable housing and assisting both communities and families. Groups of volunteers help homeowners with exterior maintenance. This typically includes painting, minor exterior repairs, landscaping, weatherization, and exterior clean-up.

== Affiliates ==
Habitat for Humanity locations in the United States

=== Jacksonville ===
Habitat for Humanity of Jacksonville (called HabiJax), is one of the larger affiliates of Habitat for Humanity (HFH) in the United States. Habijax was named the eighth-largest homebuilder in the United States by Builder magazine for 2009. HabiJax in 2023 marked 35 years of service and has provided homes to over 2,300 families.

==== History ====
The HabiJax affiliate was founded in 1988 by nine unnamed representatives from congregations in Jacksonville. Initial funding was secured from the Jessie Ball duPont Fund. Their first project was a house donated by the South Jacksonville Presbyterian Church that was moved, set up, and rehabilitated for the first HabiJax homeowner family.

==== The plan ====
New homes are not the only service that Habijax provides. In targeted neighborhoods, the nonprofit also performs home repairs, weatherization, and rehabilitation for clients, as well as housing counseling. As of 2012, they had helped over 7,500 families.

==== Local cooperation ====
The Episcopal Church of Our Saviour has been a supporter since 1994 and their crew works on several homes each year. Volunteers include U.S. Navy sailors who volunteer when their ship is in port. Every Thursday, between 10 and 20 sailors from the USS Gettysburg (CG-64) would work on a build site, doing whatever needed to be done.

==== Fairway Oaks ====
The Jimmy Carter Work Project constructed the Fairway Oaks community of 85 new single-family homes in 17 days. The Northeast Florida Builders Association (NEFBA), together with their building members and 10,000 volunteers were joined by former President Carter and Rosalynn, former HUD Secretary Jack Kemp, Habitat founders Linda and Millard Fuller, Jaguars owners Delores and Wayne Weaver and Mayor John Delaney in September, 2000 to complete the project.

===== Complaints =====
Some residents of the Fairway Oaks development have subsequently complained of health problems. Some residents argued that part of the development was constructed over a landfill, with one resident finding layers of garbage under his kitchen floorboards. Other residents allege poor construction. A lawsuit filed against HabiJax and the City of Jacksonville was dismissed However, it was unclear whether the issues are due to lack of maintenance or substandard construction.

==== Superbuild ====
In conjunction with Super Bowl XXXIX in Jacksonville, HabiJax held Superbuild: constructing 39 houses during the NFL season in 2005. The final home, number 39, was constructed in 39 working hours.

==== Downtown ====
New Town is an historic residential neighborhood in downtown Jacksonville that experienced significant urban decay by the end of the 20th century. In 2008, Jacksonville mayor John Peyton and other parties established the New Town Success Zone, modeled after New York City's Harlem Children's Zone, which provides comprehensive social and educational programs and services to children in the neighborhood. In 2012 a completed HabiJax home was furnished and decorated by a local interior designer as a model for the revitalization of the neighborhood. The project, which constructed more than 100 new homes, was completed in 2012.

=== Tiny houses ===
Habijax joined the tiny-house movement in mid-2020 with plans for a community of fifty 500–600-square-foot (46–56 m^{2}) homes in the Lackawanna neighborhood on the Westside of Jacksonville. It was funded by a grant from a Delores Barr Weaver charity. Construction began in January 2021 and the project was expected to be completed in three months. The Northeast Florida Builders Association and their member builders joined Habijax to complete the build. In a change from their Modus operandi, these houses will rented to one or two person households. Jacksonville's affordable housing crisis worsened after the pandemic, with half the city's renters paying more than 50% of monthly income on housing, which should not exceed 30%. The CEO of HabiJax, Monte Walker, explained, "They will come furnished with appliances and internet access as well. So, it's just a different way for us to serve the community in a different kind of structure".

==== ReStore ====
Habitat ReStores are retail outlets that sell new and used building and household materials donated by small businesses, large companies, job sites, contractors, and individuals. In 2008, HabiJax opened a ReStore on Beach Boulevard with inventory from 40 to 70% below retail prices. Proceeds from ReStores help pay the wages of the employees of Habitat for Humanity and the extra funds for the construction of additional houses in the community. With the success of the first ReStore, HabiJax opened a second outlet on 103rd Street. In 2021, the stores had gross sales of $1,904,575. The 38,000-square-foot (3,500 m^{2}) stores have six full-time employees but rely heavily on volunteers. When donations arrive, volunteers assess them for price and condition, clean, organize, and place them in stock. According to the National Habitat for Humanity, many ReStores cover the administrative costs of the Habitat affiliate so that 100% of donor funds can be put toward home construction and rehabilitation projects.

==== CEO retires ====
Mary Kay O'Rourke retired in 2020 after 23 years at Habijax and just as the pandemic closed the Habijax office for two years. She started in 1997 as a family selection coordinator, then the manager of family services position became available, and she was promoted. A couple of years passed before she became COO. In 2004 she was interim CEO for a year, then named president and CEO. Through the years, she has met nearly every Habijax client—over 2,000 families. O'Rourke helped keep the nonprofit financially secure by adopting a "diversified revenue model" which included fundraising campaigns, opening two ReStores to sell home-improvement products and construction materials, mortgage finance products, and now tiny house rentals.

=== New York City and Westchester County ===
Habitat for Humanity New York City and Westchester County (Habitat NYC and Westchester) was founded in 1984 as an independent affiliate, serving families across the five boroughs through home construction and preservation, beginning with their first build on the Lower East Side, during the first Jimmy & Rosalynn Carter Work Project. This 19-unit building on East 6th Street, the first Habitat building in New York City, was completed in December 1986. In 1995, four different New York City affiliates united to form one affiliate—Habitat NYC. In 2020, the affiliate expanded its work into Westchester, becoming Habitat NYC and Westchester. Sabrina Lippman was appointed CEO of Habitat NYC and Westchester in July 2024.

== Other special initiatives ==
=== Habitat Bicycle Challenge ===
The Habitat Bicycle Challenge (HBC), a nine-week, coast-to-coast bicycle trip undertaken to raise funds for Habitat for Humanity of Greater New Haven and to increase awareness of Habitat for Humanity in general, took place annually from 1995 to 2007. Prior to embarking in June on the 4,000-mile (6,400 km) trek, participants engaged in a seven-month fundraising campaign for Habitat for Humanity of Greater New Haven. Once on the road, they served as roaming advertisements for Habitat and gave nightly presentations explaining Habitat's mission to their hosts, usually church congregations. They also took part in builds with local Habitat chapters along the way.

At its height, HBC attracted about 90 participants a year, all aged 18 to 24 and with about half coming from Yale University. Each rider traveled one of three routes: New Haven to San Francisco, New Haven to Portland, or New Haven to Seattle. By 2004 HBC had become the single largest yearly fundraiser for any Habitat affiliate in the world, raising about $400,000 a year. However, amid growing safety concerns, Habitat for Humanity of Greater New Haven was forced to announce the cancellation of HBC in September 2007.

=== Jimmy and Rosalynn Carter Work Project ===
In May 2026, volunteers built 24 homes over five days in Atlanta for the 40th Jimmy and Rosalynn Carter Work Project. Each house costs about $250,000 to build including volunteer labor and donations from companies such as Coca-Cola, HMTX Industries, Home Depot, JE Dunn, MasterBrand, and Rheem Manufacturing.

== Criticism ==
Cost-effectiveness

Habitat has been criticized for its slow and inefficient rebuilding efforts along the Gulf Coast after Hurricanes Katrina and Rita. An article in the Weekly Standard, a conservative American opinion magazine, questioned the cost-effectiveness of Habitat building projects. To estimate cost effectiveness, the magazine alleged that all costs associated with building a Habitat home must be used, including the cost of volunteer time and training. Habitat affiliates in the region have remained some of the largest homebuilders in their areas and have received numerous awards and acknowledgements for their work in building quality homes.

Partnering with low-income families

Families are required to show an ability to pay for their home in addition to the need for housing. With these requirements, homeless and low-income families may fail to qualify for a Habitat home. Most American Habitat affiliates perform credit checks and criminal record checks on applicants before partnering with them for the construction of a home. Some critics therefore allege that Habitat misrepresents the nature of its work by partnering with families that might be considered nearly "middle-income". To address this, many Habitat affiliates in the United States partner only with families that fall below the government-set "poverty line" for their area. The current poverty rate is measured according to the United States Department of Health and Human Services Poverty Guidelines.

Ousting of the founder

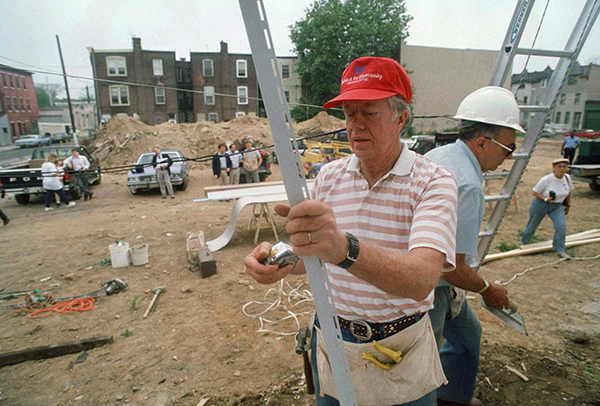
Jimmy Carter in 1988

The Habitat board investigated Millard Fuller for sexual harassment but found "insufficient proof of inappropriate conduct." Some Fuller supporters claim that the firing was due to a change in corporate culture.

Before Fuller's termination, attempts were made by former President Jimmy Carter to broker an agreement that would allow Fuller to retire with his $79,000 salary intact; when Fuller was found to have violated the non-disclosure portion of this agreement, he was subsequently fired, and his wife, Linda, was also fired.

== See also ==
- Habitat for Humanity Canada
- Habitat for Humanity Ireland
- Habitat for Humanity Uganda
