= Habitat Bicycle Challenge =

The Habitat Bicycle Challenge (HBC) was a nine-week, student-led bicycle trip undertaken to raise funds for Habitat for Humanity of Greater New Haven and to increase awareness of Habitat for Humanity in general. Occurring annually from 1995 to 2007, the trip traversed the United States from the East Coast to the West Coast. Co-Founded in 1994 by Yale University students Antony Brydon and Tina Teresa Pihl, the original Habitat Bicycle Challenge featured eight riders bicycling from New Haven to San Francisco, California in the summer of 1995. By the time the final ride took place in 2007, HBC attracted about 90 participants a year and had grown to include two additional routes, one ending in Portland, Oregon (after reaching the Pacific Ocean at Cape Lookout) and the other ending in Seattle, Washington. Even as it grew, HBC retained its origins as a student-run organization, with a core group of twelve leaders (four per route) organizing every aspect of the three trips, from planning routes to securing corporate sponsorships. Sponsors included Green Mountain Gringo Salsa, Clif Bar, Cannondale, Energy Brands, Bear Naked, and Mortgage Lenders Network, among others.

Because the three trips served as benefit rides for Habitat for Humanity of Greater New Haven, each rider was required to raise a substantial amount of money ($4000 by 2007) prior to the trips' departure in June. Corporate sponsorships and grants from foundations covered the cost of the trips themselves, so every dollar raised went directly towards underwriting the construction costs of the Collegiate Build, a subsidiary of Habitat for Humanity of Greater New Haven that funds and constructs Habitat houses entirely through the efforts of students from Yale University and other colleges in the New Haven area. In its first year HBC raised about $50,000, and by 2004 it had become the single largest fundraiser for any Habitat affiliate in the world, raising over $400,000 a year, enough money to underwrite the construction of eight homes. Over the course of its 12-year run, the Habitat Bicycle Challenge raised roughly $2.4 million.

On the road, participants served as roaming advertisements for Habitat for Humanity. They were supported by the generosity of the communities through which they traveled, typically sleeping in churches and eating food provided by the congregations of those churches. They gave nightly presentations about Habitat, its mission, and their trip, and at several points along the way, they worked on local Habitat build sites. Thus, they spread awareness of Habitat's mission to hundreds of communities across the United States.

The Habitat Bicycle Challenge was plagued by three significant and independent casualties, all involving Yale students. In 2005, a female rider died when she was struck by a car on a road in Carbondale, Illinois. Just a few weeks prior to the 2006 trip, a male participant died when he was hit by a truck while biking to rowing practice in New Haven, and in 2007, a male rider was hit by a car in Kansas and suffered traumatic brain injury resulting in permanent impairment. Amid continued safety concerns, Habitat for Humanity of Greater New Haven announced on September 24, 2007 that the Habitat Bicycle Challenge would not continue.

The Habitat Bicycle Challenge is the subject of the 2004 documentary Hammer and Cycle.

Bike and Build, a similar program, was founded in 2002 by a former HBC rider. Though not directly affiliated with Habitat for Humanity, it carries on the legacy of the Habitat Bicycle Challenge.
