= Russell Treyz =

Theater director

Russell Treyz (August 9, 1940 - August 16, 2024) was an American regional theater director and co-writer of the musical Cotton Patch Gospel. He won the Drama Desk Award in 1972 for his play Whitsuntide.

== Personal background ==
He graduated from Princeton University and the Yale School of Drama. He married documentary filmmaker Alice Elliott in 1972.

== Career ==
As author/director, Russell collaborated with the late songwriter Harry Chapin on the Broadway musical Cotton Patch Gospel, published by Dramatic Publishing in 1982.

He directed Orlando Shakespeare Festival productions of Around the World in 80 Days; Twelfth Night; Henry IV, Part I; Othello; As You Like It; Julius Caesar and Hamlet. He also directed King John at the Utah Shakespeare Festival, 1776 at the Porthouse Theatre in Kent, Ohio, Brighton Beach Memoirs at Connecticut College and Much Ado About Nothing at West End Theatre in New York City, among many others.

Also in New York, he directed at The American Place Theater, Playwrights Horizons and La MaMa Experimental Theater Club. His extensive regional credits include Alabama Shakespeare Festival, Goodspeed Opera, and Actors Theatre of Louisville.
