= Clarence Jordan =

American farmer and New Testament Greek scholar

Clarence Jordan (July 29, 1912 – October 29, 1969) was an American farmer and Baptist theologian, founder of Koinonia Farm, a small but influential religious community in southwest Georgia and the author of the Cotton Patch paraphrase of the New Testament. He was also instrumental in the founding of Habitat for Humanity. His second cousin, Hamilton Jordan, served as White House Chief of Staff during the Jimmy Carter administration.

== Life ==
=== Early years ===
Clarence Jordan was born in Talbotton, Georgia, as the seventh of ten children to James Weaver and Maude Josey Jordan, prominent citizens of Talbotton. From an early age, Jordan was troubled by the racial and economic injustice that he perceived in his community. Hoping to improve the lot of sharecroppers through scientific farming techniques, he enrolled in the University of Georgia, earning a degree in agriculture in 1933. During his college years, however, he became convinced that the roots of poverty were spiritual as well as economic. This conviction led Jordan to the Southern Baptist Theological Seminary in Louisville, Kentucky, from which he earned a Th.M. and a Ph.D. in the Greek New Testament in 1938. He was ordained as a Southern Baptist minister. While at seminary, Jordan met Florence Kroeger, whom he married.

=== Koinonia Farm ===
In 1942, the Jordans, another couple – Martin and Mabel England, who had previously served as American Baptist missionaries – and their families moved to a 440-acre (1.8 km^{2}) tract of land near Americus, Georgia, to create an interracial, Christian farming community. They called it Koinonia (κοινωνία), a word meaning 'communion' or 'fellowship' that in Acts 2:42 is applied to the earliest Christian community.

The Koinonia partners bound themselves to the equality of all persons, rejection of violence, ecological stewardship, and common ownership of possessions. For several years the residents of Koinonia lived in relative peace alongside their Sumter County. However, as the Civil Rights Movement progressed, white citizens of the area increasingly perceived Koinonia as a threat. In the 1950s and early 1960s, Koinonia became the target of a stifling economic boycott and repeated violence, including several bombings. When Jordan sought help from President Eisenhower, the federal government refused to intervene, instead referring the matter to the governor of Georgia. The governor, Marvin Griffin, a staunch supporter of racial segregation, responded by ordering the Georgia Bureau of Investigation to investigate Koinonia's partners and supporters for purported Communist ties.

Jordan chose not to participate in the marches and demonstrations of the era, instead believing that the best way to effect change in society was by living, in community, a radically different life.

Koinonia Farm continues to operate as a working farm and intentional Christian community welcoming visitors and interns and operating various ministries as an alternative to materialism, militarism and racism.

=== Cotton Patch series ===
In the late 1960s, the hostilities gradually subsided, and Jordan increasingly turned his energies to speaking and writing. Among the latter are his well-known Cotton Patch series, homey translations of New Testament writings. Jordan believed it was necessary not only to translate individual words and phrases, but also the context of Scripture. Thus, Jordan retitled the Apostle Paul's Epistle to the Ephesians "The Letter to the Christians in Birmingham." His translation of Ephesians 2:11–13 is typical:

So then, always remember that previously you Negroes, who sometimes are even called "niggers" by thoughtless white church members, were at one time outside the Christian fellowship, denied your rights as fellow believers, and treated as though the gospel didn't apply to you, hopeless and God-forsaken in the eyes of the world. Now, however, because of Christ's supreme sacrifice, you who once were so segregated are warmly welcomed into the Christian fellowship.

Along with his rendering of "Jew and Gentile" as "white man and Negro," Jordan converted all references to "crucifixion" into references to "lynching," believing that no other term was adequate for conveying the sense of the event into a modern American idiom:

[T]here just isn't any word in our vocabulary which adequately translates the Greek word for "crucifixion." Our crosses are so shined, so polished, so respectable that to be impaled on one of them would seem to be a blessed experience. We have thus emptied the term "crucifixion" of its original content of terrific emotion, of violence, of indignity and stigma, of defeat. I have translated it as "lynching," well aware that this is not technically correct. Jesus was officially tried and legally condemned, elements generally lacking in a lynching. But having observed the operation of Southern "justice," and at times having been its victim, I can testify that more people have been lynched "by judicial action" than by unofficial ropes. Pilate at least had the courage and the honesty to publicly wash his hands and disavow all legal responsibility. "See to it yourselves," he told the mob. And they did. They crucified him in Judea and they strung him up in Georgia, with a noose tied to a pine tree.

The Cotton Patch series used American analogies for places in the New Testament; Rome became Washington, D.C., Judaea became Georgia (the Governor of Judaea became the Governor of Georgia), Jerusalem became Atlanta, and Bethlehem became Gainesville, Georgia.

Jordan's translations of scripture portions led to the creation of a musical, Cotton Patch Gospel, telling the life of Jesus Christ using his style and set in Georgia, and incorporating some passages from his translations.

=== Habitat for Humanity ===
In 1965, Millard and Linda Fuller visited Koinonia, planning only to stay for a couple of hours. Inspired by Jordan, however, the Fullers chose to make Koinonia their permanent home in mid-1968. A marital crisis and dissatisfaction with their millionaire lifestyle had earlier persuaded the couple to sell their possessions and seek a life together in Christian service. The Fuller family brought renewed energy to Koinonia. The organization changed its name to Koinonia Partners and started a number of partnership type ventures such as "Partnership Housing," a project to build and sell quality, affordable homes at cost with a no interest mortgage for low-income area families. The Fullers' five years at Koinonia followed by three years of building "partnership housing" in the Democratic Republic of Congo (then known as Zaire or Belgian Congo) would eventually lead, in 1976, to the creation of Habitat for Humanity.

On October 29, 1969, Jordan died suddenly of a heart attack, before the first house had been completed. As he had requested, Jordan had a simple burial; his body was placed in a shipping crate from a local casket manufacturer and was buried in an unmarked grave on Koinonia property. Jordan's funeral was attended by his family, the Koinonia partners, and the poor of the community. Florence Jordan died at Koinonia in 1987 and was buried there. Jordan's papers are housed at the University of Georgia.

== Published works ==
- Jordan, Clarence (1953). Why Study the Bible. Philadelphia: Baptist Youth Fellowship.
- Jordan, Clarence (1963). The Letter to the Hebrews or a First Century Manual For Church Renewal in the Koinonia 'Cotton Patch' Version. Americus, Georgia: Koinonia Farm.
- Jordan, Clarence (1964). Practical Religion, or the Sermon on the Mount and the Epistle of James in the Koinonia Farm 'Cotton Patch' Version. Americus, Georgia: Koinonia Farm.
- Jordan, Clarence (1967). Letters to Young Christians (I and II Timothy and Titus) in the Koinonia 'Cotton Patch' Version. Americus, Georgia: Koinonia Farm.
- Jordan, Clarence (1967). Letters to God's People in Columbus (Colossians) and Selma (I and II Thessalonians) in the Koinonia 'Cotton Patch' Version. Americus, Georgia: Koinonia Farm.
- Jordan, Clarence (1968). Second Letter to the Christians in Atlanta or Second Corinthians in the Koinonia 'Cotton Patch' Version. Americus, Georgia: Koinonia Farm.
- Jordan, Clarence (1968). To God's People in Washington: The Koinonia 'Cotton Patch' Version of Romans. Americus, Georgia: Koinonia Farm.
- Jordan, Clarence (1968). Letters to Ephesians and Philemon in the Koinonia 'Cotton Patch' Version of Romans. Americus, Georgia: Koinonia Farm.
- Jordan, Clarence (1968). Letters to The Georgia Convention (Galatians) and to the Alabaster African Church, Smithville, Alabama (Philippians), in the Koinonia 'Cotton Patch' Version of Romans. Americus, Georgia: Koinonia Farm.
- Jordan, Clarence (1968). The Cotton Patch Version of Paul's Epistles. New York: Association Press.
- Jordan, Clarence (1969). The Cotton Patch Version of Luke-Acts, Jesus Doings and Happenings. New York: Association Press.
- Jordan, Clarence (1970). The Sermon on the Mount (Revised ed.). Valley Forge, Pennsylvania: Judson Press.
- Jordan, Clarence (1972). Lee, Dallas (ed.). The Substance of Faith and Other Cotton Patch Sermons. New York: Association Press.
- Jordan, Clarence (1973). The Cotton Patch Version of Hebrews and the General Epistles. New York: Association Press.
- Jordan, Clarence; with Bill Doulos (1976). Cotton Patch Parables of Liberation. Scottdale, Pennsylvania: Herald Books.
- Jordan, Clarence (2004). Cotton Patch Version of Matthew and John. Macon, Georgia: Smyth & Helwys.
- Jordan, Clarence (2022). The Inconvenient Gospel: A Southern Prophet Tackles War, Wealth, Race, and Religion. Walden, New York: Plough Publishing.
