= Habitat for Humanity Ireland =

Nonprofit development organisation

Habitat for Humanity Ireland logo

Habitat for Humanity Ireland is a nonprofit development organisation which seeks to "bring people together to build homes, communities and hope".

== Origins and patronage ==
Early in 2001, a group of individuals and representatives of churches and housing organisations from Dublin became interested in Habitat for Humanity's work. In June 2002, a core group headed to Durban, South Africa, for the Jimmy Carter Work Project to experience the work of Habitat for Humanity firsthand. Upon their return, they formed a steering board and started an affiliation process.

In November 2002, Habitat for Humanity International's founder met with then President Mary McAleese at Áras an Uachtaráin. On the same day the international board of directors approved the formation of Habitat for Humanity Ireland in Belfast.

== Programmes ==
=== Irish programmes ===
Habitat for Humanity Ireland also runs a "local programme", which partners with local authorities and organisations in Dublin, to build and renovate houses in partnership with low-income families in the Dublin area. In 2012 the Local Programme project took place in Inchicore, Dublin. President of Ireland Michael D. Higgins visited the site and the homeowner families in April 2012. In 2014 Habitat renovated two properties in Dublin 1.
