= Cotton Patch Gospel =

Musical by Tom Key and Russell Treyz

- The Greatest Story Ever Retold!
- Music: Harry Chapin
- Lyrics: Harry Chapin
- Book: Tom Key; Russell Treyz
- Basis: Clarence Jordan's translation of the gospels of Matthew and John,The Cotton Patch Version of Matthew and John
- Premiere: October 21, 1981

Cotton Patch Gospel is a musical by Tom Key and Russell Treyz with music and lyrics written by Harry Chapin. The musical was produced by Philip M. Getter just after Chapin's death in July 1981.

It premiered off-Broadway on October 21, 1981, at the Lamb's Theatre for 193 performances. Based on the book The Cotton Patch Version of Matthew and John by Clarence Jordan, the story retells the life of Jesus as if in modern day, rural Georgia. Though the setting and the styling of the language greatly differs from the original telling of the Gospels the plot structure and the message of the story stays true to the historical recording in The Gospel of Matthew.

Using a southern reinterpretation of the gospel story, the musical is often performed in a one-man show format with an accompanying quartet of bluegrass musicians, although a larger cast can also be used. A video recording of the play was released in 1988 with Tom Key as the leading actor.

Tom Chapin served as musical director. Americana musician Jim Lauderdale was in the cast as one of "The Cotton Pickers."

== Plot ==
The story begins with the story of a young couple. Mary is engaged to Joe Davidson ("David's Son" referring to the lineage of Christ coming through the Davidic line). Even though she is a virgin, she is found to be with child before they are married. This child is conceived of the Holy Spirit. Joe considers not going through with the marriage, but is visited by an angel who tells him that it is the will of God that is occurring and not foul play, so he marries his girl.

Due to an income tax audit, they must then travel to Gainesville; on the way, Mary suddenly goes into labor. There's no room for them at the Dixie Delight Motor Lodge, but the manager helps Joe break into an abandoned trailer out back, where the baby, Jesus, is born: "They wrapped him in a comforter and laid him in an apple crate".

Jesus grows up like no other child in Georgia with his neighbors befuddled and his parents often at a loss as to what to do. Jesus then is baptized by a wild preacher named John the Baptizer, and begins to teach the people and convince the disciples. He shares with them the love and peace he offers, and miraculously heals and feeds many. During this time Jesus gathers a band of constant followers (known as the Apostles in the Bible.) This group eventually heads off to Atlanta with a mixed air of excitement and foreboding.

== Reception ==
The New York Times highlighted the music in its review, saying "The music repeatedly elevates the evening."

== Characters ==
The main characters are Jesus, Mary, Joseph, Pontius Pilate, John the Baptist, Caiaphas, Herod, Apostle Peter, Apostle Matthew

== Musical score ==
- "Something's Brewing in Gainesville"
- "I Did It/Mama Is Here"
- "It Isn't Easy"
- "Sho Nuff"
- "Turn It Around"
- "When I Look Up"
- "Busy Signals"
- "Spitball"
- "Going to Atlanta"
- "Are We Ready?"
- "You are Still My Boy"
- "We Gotta Get Organized"
- "We're Gonna Love It While It Lasts"
- "Jubilation"
- "The Last Supper"
- "Jud"
- "Thank God for Governor Pilate"
- "One More Tomorrow"
- "Well I Wonder"

== Production ==
The musicians appear on stage and incorporated into the acting.

The rephrasing of well known scripture into the context and colloquial language of the south eastern region of the United States provides humor in the production lines delivered out of their familiar scriptural language.

- Jesus: [after being tested by the devil] "I passed."; and Matthew: "And then angels appeared with a sack of chili cheese dogs for him."
  - Instead of: Matthew 4:11 Then the devil left him, and angels came and attended him.
- Jesus: "Men don't live by grits alone."
  - Instead of: Matthew 4:4 Jesus answered, "It is written: 'Man shall not live on bread alone, but on every word that comes from the mouth of God.'"
