= Jimmy & Rosalynn Carter Work Project =

Annual home building blitz for Habitat for Humanity

The Jimmy & Rosalynn Carter Work Project - formerly the Jimmy Carter Work Project (JCWP) - is an annual home building blitz for Habitat for Humanity that started in 1984 when Jimmy and Rosalynn Carter started volunteering for Habitat for Humanity. By 2024, the project had built and renovated a total of 4,400 homes in 17 countries with help from 106,000 volunteers.
